= List of presidents of the Geological Society of London =

This is a list of the presidents of the Geological Society of London.

== List of presidents ==
- 1807–1813 George Bellas Greenough
- 1813–1815 Henry Grey Bennet
- 1815–1816 William Blake
- 1816–1818 John MacCulloch
- 1818–1820 George Bellas Greenough
- 1820–1822 Spencer Compton, Earl Compton
- 1822–1824 William Babington
- 1824–1826 William Buckland
- 1826–1827 John Bostock
- 1827–1829 William Henry Fitton
- 1829–1831 Adam Sedgwick
- 1831–1833 Roderick Impey Murchison
- 1833–1835 George Bellas Greenough
- 1835–1837 Charles Lyell
- 1837–1839 William Whewell
- 1839–1841 William Buckland
- 1841–1843 Roderick Impey Murchison
- 1843–1845 Henry Warburton
- 1845–1847 Leonard Horner
- 1847–1849 Henry Thomas De la Beche
- 1849–1851 Charles Lyell
- 1851–1853 William Hopkins
- 1853–1854 Edward Forbes
- 1854–1856 William Hamilton
- 1856–1856 Daniel Sharpe
- 1856–1858 Joseph Ellison Portlock
- 1858–1860 John Phillips
- 1860–1862 Leonard Horner
- 1862–1864 Andrew Crombie Ramsay
- 1864–1866 William Hamilton
- 1866–1868 Warington Wilkinson Smyth
- 1868–1870 Thomas Henry Huxley
- 1870–1872 Joseph Prestwich
- 1872–1874 George Campbell, 8th Duke of Argyll
- 1874–1876 John Evans
- 1876–1878 Peter Martin Duncan
- 1878–1880 Henry Clifton Sorby
- 1880–1882 Robert Etheridge
- 1882–1884 John Whitaker Hulke
- 1884–1886 Thomas George Bonney
- 1886–1888 John Wesley Judd
- 1888–1890 William Thomas Blanford
- 1890–1892 Archibald Geikie
- 1892–1894 Wilfred Hudleston Hudleston
- 1894–1896 Henry Woodward
- 1896–1898 Henry Hicks
- 1898–1900 William Whitaker
- 1900–1902 Jethro Justinian Harris Teall
- 1902–1904 Charles Lapworth
- 1904–1906 John Edward Marr
- 1906–1908 Archibald Geikie
- 1908–1910 William Johnson Sollas
- 1910–1912 William Whitehead Watts
- 1912–1914 Aubrey Strahan
- 1914–1916 Arthur Smith Woodward
- 1916–1918 Alfred Harker
- 1918–1920 George William Lamplugh
- 1920–1922 Richard Dixon Oldham
- 1922–1924 Albert Seward
- 1924–1926 John William Evans
- 1926–1928 Francis Arthur Bather
- 1928–1930 John Walter Gregory
- 1930–1932 Edmund Johnston Garwood
- 1932–1934 Thomas Henry Holland
- 1934–1936 John Frederick Norman Green
- 1936–1938 Owen Thomas Jones
- 1938–1940 Henry Hurd Swinnerton
- 1940–1941 Percy George Hamnall Boswell
- 1941–1943 Herbert Leader Hawkins
- 1943–1945 William George Fearnsides
- 1945–1947 Arthur Elijah Trueman
- 1947–1949 Herbert Harold Read
- 1949–1950 Cecil Edgar Tilley
- 1950–1951 Owen Thomas Jones
- 1951–1953 George Martin Lees
- 1953–1955 William Bernard Robinson King
- 1955–1956 Walter Campbell Smith
- 1956–1958 Leonard Hawkes
- 1958–1960 Cyril James Stubblefield
- 1960–1962 Sydney Ewart Hollingworth
- 1962–1964 Oliver Meredith Boone Bulman
- 1964–1966 Frederick William Shotton
- 1966–1968 Kingsley Charles Dunham
- 1968–1970 Neville George
- 1970–1972 William Alexander Deer
- 1972–1974 Thomas Stanley Westoll
- 1974–1976 Percy Edward Kent
- 1976–1978 Wallace Spencer Pitcher
- 1978–1980 Percival Allen
- 1980–1982 Edward Howel Francis
- 1982–1984 Janet Vida Watson
- 1984–1986 Charles Hepworth Holland
- 1986–1988 Bernard Elgey Leake
- 1988–1990 Derek John Blundell
- 1990–1992 Anthony Leonard Harris
- 1992–1994 Charles David Curtis
- 1994–1996 (Robert) Stephen (John) Sparks
- 1996–1998 Richard Hardman
- 1998–2000 Robin Cocks
- 2000–2002 Ronald Oxburgh, Baron Oxburgh
- 2002–2004 Mark Moody-Stuart
- 2004–2006 Peter Styles
- 2006–2008 Richard Fortey
- 2008–2010 Lynne Frostick
- 2010–2012 (Julian Patrick) Bryan Lovell
- 2012–2014 David Thomas Shilston
- 2014–2016 David Andrew Charles Manning
- 2016–2018 Malcolm Brown
- 2018–2020 Nick Rogers
- 2020–2022 Michael Daly
- 2022-2024 Ruth Allington
- 2024-2026 Jon Gluyas
- 2026-2028 Jessica T Smith

== See also ==
- List of geologists
