= Bigsby Medal =

The Bigsby Medal is a medal of the Geological Society of London established by John Jeremiah Bigsby.

== Recipients ==
Source:The Geological Society

- 1877 Othniel Charles Marsh
- 1879 Edward Drinker Cope
- 1881 Charles Barrois
- 1883 Henry Hicks
- 1885 Alphonse Renard
- 1887 Charles Lapworth
- 1889 Jethro Justinian Harris Teall
- 1891 George Mercer Dawson
- 1893 William Johnson Sollas
- 1895 Charles Doolittle Walcott
- 1897 Clement Reid
- 1899 Edgeworth David
- 1901 George William Lamplugh
- 1903 Henri-Marc Ami
- 1905 John Walter Gregory
- 1907 Arthur William Rogers
- 1909 John Smith Flett
- 1911 Othenio Abel
- 1913 Thomas Henry Holland
- 1915 Henry Hubert Hayden
- 1917 Robert George Carruthers
- 1919 Douglas Mawson
- 1921 Lewis Leigh Fermor
- 1923 Edward Battersby Bailey
- 1925 Cyril Workman Knight
- 1927 Bernard Smith
- 1929 Percy George Hamnall Boswell
- 1931 Norman Levi Bowen
- 1933 Edward James Wayland
- 1935 Herbert Harold Read
- 1937 Cecil Edgar Tilley
- 1939 Arthur Elijah Trueman
- 1941 Cyril James Stubblefield
- 1943 George Martin Lees
- 1945 Lawrence Rickard Wager
- 1947 George Hoole Mitchell
- 1949 William Quarrier Kennedy
- 1951 Edwin Sherbon Hills
- 1953 Kingsley Charles Dunham
- 1955 Percy Edward Kent
- 1957 Harry Blackmore Whittington
- 1959 Basil Charles King
- 1961 Alwyn Williams
- 1963 Wallace Spencer Pitcher
- 1965 John Sutton
- 1965 Janet Vida Watson
- 1967 Frank H. T. Rhodes
- 1969 Richard Gilbert West
- 1971 Frederick John Vine
- 1973 John G. Ramsay
- 1975 Drummond Hoyle Matthews
- 1977 Brian Frederick Windley
- 1979 Ernest Ronald Oxburgh
- 1981 Alan Gilbert Smith
- 1983 Robert Keith O'Nions
- 1985 Robert Stephen John Sparks
- 1987 Nick Kusznir
- 1989 Trevor Elliott
- 1991 Robert Stephen White
- 1993 Julian Pearce
- 1995 Andrew Benjamin Smith
- 1997 James Anthony Jackson
- 1999 Ali Mehmet Celal Sengor
- 2001 Nicholas Jeremiah White
- 2003 Paul Nicholas Pearson
- 2005 Jonathan Blundy
- 2006 Jon Lloyd (microbiologist)
- 2007 Philip Donoghue
- 2008 Christopher John Ballentine
- 2009 Christian Turney
- 2010 Sara Russell
- 2011 Alexander Logan Densmore
- 2012 Geoffrey Duller
- 2013 Christopher Jackson
- 2014 John Maclennan
- 2015 Daniel Parsons
- 2016 Liane G. Benning
- 2017 Caroline Lear
- 2018 Simon Poulton
- 2019 Emily Rayfield
- 2020 Bridget Wade
- 2021 Marie Edmonds
- 2022 Catherine Annen
- 2023 Stephen Barker
- 2024 Daniela Schmidt
- 2025 Kate Hendry

== See also ==
- List of geology awards
- Prizes named after people
