= Catherine Annen =

French geologist

Catherine Jeanne Annen
- Education: University of Geneva
- Awards: Bigsby Medal
- Scientific career
- Institutions: University of Bristol; University of Geneva; Czech Academy of Sciences
- Thesis: Modélisation de la croissance des volcans (1999)

Catherine Jeanne Annen is a French geologist at the Czech Academy of Sciences. Her research considers igneous bodies, volcanic eruptions. and exploration for geothermal energy. She was awarded the 2022 Geological Society of London Bigsby Medal.

== Early life and education ==
Annen studied earth sciences at the University of Geneva. Alongside her studies she worked as a teaching assistant on the modelling of volcanic processes. She remained in Geneva for graduate research, working partly at the Blaise Pascal University. Her research considered how to model the growth of volcanoes. After earning her doctorate, Annen joined the University of Bristol, where she worked on models of magma injection and incrementally emplaced intrusions.

== Research and career ==
Annen returned to the University of Geneva in 2003, where she worked as an assistant professor. She was appointed to the faculty at the University of Bristol in 2009. Her research combined numerical simulations with heat transfer models to better understand magmatic processes. She was particularly interested in the genesis of differentiated melts and how pluton emplacement impacts the growth of large magma chambers. She studied the Soufrière Hills and Mount Pelée. She uncovered the environmental circumstances that determine the frequency of volcanic activity and the magnitude of volcanic phenomena. Small frequent eruptions are triggered by magma replenishment, whilst larger eruptions are caused by magma buoyancy. This buoyancy results in less frequent eruptions and is powered by the accumulation of less dense magma underneath volcanoes. Her findings predict that the largest possible volcanic eruption would result in the release of 3,500 km^{3} of magma.

Annen was made Chief Editor of Frontiers in Earth Sciences in 2015. In 2022 she was elected vice president of the Volcanic and igneous plumbing systems committee. In 2021 Annen joined the Czech Academy of Sciences where she works on the formation and differentiation of magma chambers.

== Awards and honours ==
- 2022 Geological Society of London Bigsby Medal

== Selected publications ==
- C. Annen; J. D. Blundy; R. S. J. Sparks (7 December 2005). "The Genesis of Intermediate and Silicic Magmas in Deep Crustal Hot Zones". Journal of Petrology. 47 (3): 505–539. Bibcode:2005JPet...47..505A. doi:10.1093/petrology/egi084. ISSN 0022-3530. Wikidata Q101010935.
- C. Annen; R.S.J. Sparks (November 2002). "Effects of repetitive emplacement of basaltic intrusions on thermal evolution and melt generation in the crust". Earth and Planetary Science Letters. 203 (3–4): 937–955. Bibcode:2002E&PSL.203..937A. doi:10.1016/s0012-821x(02)00929-9. ISSN 0012-821X. Wikidata Q56212021.
- Catherine Annen; Jonathan D. Blundy; Julien Leuthold; R. Stephen J. Sparks (August 2015). "Construction and evolution of igneous bodies: Towards an integrated perspective of crustal magmatism". Lithos. 230: 206–221. doi:10.1016/j.lithos.2015.05.008. ISSN 0024-4937. Wikidata Q56456337.
