= Bärbel Hönisch =

German paleoclimatologist (born 1974)

- Born: 1974 (age 51–52)
- Education: Bielefeld University; University of Bremen
- Scientific career
- Workplaces: Columbia University
- Website: www.ldeo.columbia.edu/~hoenisch

Bärbel Hönisch (born 1974) is a German paleoceanographer and paleoclimatologist, author, and professor at Columbia University.

== Education ==
Hönisch earned a vordiplom in biology at Bielefeld University in 1995, a diplom (master's degree) in marine biology in 1999 at the University of Bremen, and a Doctor of Philosophy in natural sciences in 2002 at the Alfred Wegener Institute for Polar and Marine Research.

== Career and research ==
From 2002 to 2006 she worked in various scientific roles, including at the Lamont–Doherty Earth Observatory, and since 2007 she has been a professor at Columbia University. She has been a tenured professor at the Department of Earth & Environmental Sciences there since 2019.

Based on an analysis of the Middle Pleistocene, in the course of which the duration of the various glacial periods increased from 40,000 to 100,000 years, Hoenisch and her co-authors reconstructed the temperature fluctuations and the carbon dioxide concentration over the past 2.1 million years in a study published in 2009 indicating that the current CO_{2} values are the highest within this comparison period.

She was the lead author of a 2012 study on ocean acidification in Science, collaborating with James Zachos, Ellen Thomas, and others. Summarizing the results, she said, "What we’re doing today really stands out. We know that life during past ocean acidification events was not wiped out—new species evolved to replace those that died off. But if industrial carbon emissions continue at the current pace, we may lose organisms we care about—coral reefs, oysters, salmon."

Hönisch received the 2018 Willi Dansgaard Award from the American Geophysical Union in recognition of her "research impact, innovative interdisciplinary work, educational accomplishments (mentoring), societal impact, or other relevant contributions and to acknowledge that the awardee shows exceptional promise for continued leadership in paleoceanography or paleoclimatology." The award cited her pioneering work in the development and application of geochemical proxies for reconstruction of paleo ocean temperatures, carbonate chemistry, and atmospheric CO_{2}.

In 2018 she gave the Marie-Tharp Lecture at GEOMAR.

Web of Science records 60 publications and an h-Index of 27 (as of January 2020).

=== Selected publications ===
- Bärbel Hönisch; Andy Ridgwell; Daniela N Schmidt; et al. (2 March 2012). "The geological record of ocean acidification". Science. 335 (6072): 1058–63. Bibcode:2012Sci...335.1058H. doi:10.1126/science.1208277. ISSN 0036-8075. PMID 22383840. Wikidata Q28261134.
- PALAEOSENS Project Members; et al. (28 November 2012). "Making sense of palaeoclimate sensitivity". Nature. 491 (7426). Springer Science and Business Media LLC: 683–691. Bibcode:2012Natur.491..683P. doi:10.1038/nature11574. hdl:1874/385699. ISSN 0028-0836. PMID 23192145. S2CID 2840337.

== Bibliography ==
- Bärbel Hönisch, Professor Earth and Environmental Sciences, Geochemistry, Columbia University
- Women in Oceanography: A Decade Later, Autobiographical Sketches, Bärbel Hönisch, Associate Professor, Department of Earth and Environmental Sciences and Lamont–Doherty Earth Observatory of Columbia University, Palisades, NY, USA, in: Oceanography, the official magazine of The Oceanographic Society, S. 139, PDF, S. 93
