= List of fellows of the Royal Society elected in 2008 =

Fellows, foreign members and honorary fellows of the Royal Society elected in 2008.

== Fellows ==
1. Girish Agarwal
2. Dario Alessi
3. Michael Alpers
4. Fraser Armstrong
5. Alan Ashworth
6. John Irving Bell
7. Jon Blundy
8. Leszek Borysiewicz
9. Alexander Bradshaw
10. Stephen M. Cohen
11. Fergus Craik
12. David Deutsch
13. John Duncan
14. Russell Grant Foster
15. Brian Foster
16. Derek John Fray
17. Peter John Hudson
18. Christopher Alexander Hunter
19. Stephen Jackson
20. Nicholas Kaiser
21. Mark Kisin
22. Christopher John Lamb
23. Peter Simon Liss
24. Jan Löwe
25. Yiu-Wing Mai
26. John C. Marshall
27. Harvey Thomas McMahon
28. Anne O'Garra
29. Peter Robert Parham
30. Ian Parker
31. Michael Christopher Payne
32. Laurence Pearl
33. Matthew Rosseinsky
34. Robert Graham Goodwin Russell
35. Chris Toumazou
36. George Sawatzky
37. James Scott
38. Evgeny Konstantintinovich Sklyanin
39. Philip John Stephens
40. Claudio Daniel Stern
41. Michael Stratton
42. Roger Summons
43. Ulrike Tillmann
44. Kenneth Nigel Timmis
45. Chris Toumazou

== Foreign members ==
1. J. Michael Bishop
2. William A. Catterall
3. Barbara Leonare Hohn
4. Ho-kwang Mao
5. Peter Marler
6. David Mumford
7. Richard Schrock
8. Susan Solomon

== Honorary Fellow ==
1. David Sainsbury, Baron Sainsbury of Turville
