= John MacCulloch =

Scottish geologist (1773–1835)

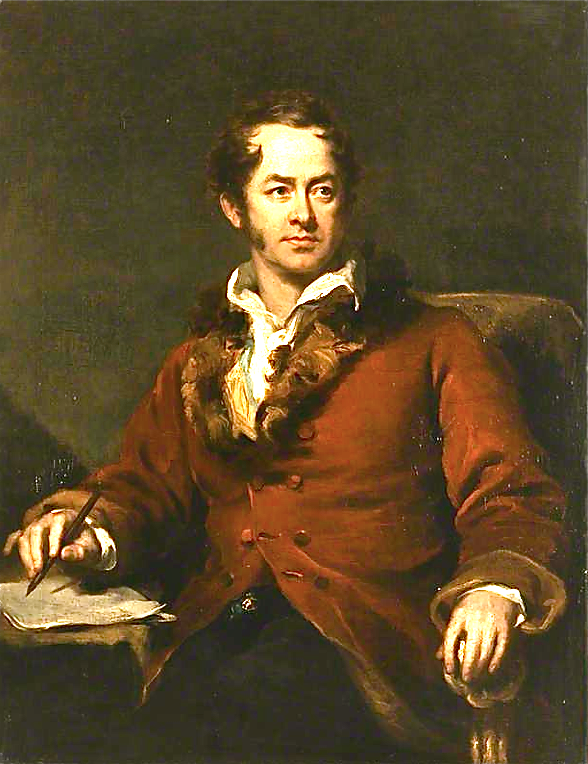
- John MacCulloch
- Born: 6 October 1773; Guernsey
- Died: 21 August 1835 (aged 61); Penzance
- Scientific career
- Fields: Geologist, Surgeon and Civil Engineer

John MacCulloch FRS (6 October 1773 – 21 August 1835) was a Scottish geologist. He was the first geologist to be employed by the government in Britain and is best known for his pioneering texts on geology and for producing the first geological maps of Scotland. He introduced the word "malaria" into the English language.

== Biography ==
MacCulloch, descended from the MacCullochs of Nether Ardwell in Galloway, was born in Guernsey, his mother being a native of that island. He was born at the home of his mother's parents, grandfather James being a magistrate. John's father, James, worked in France as wine merchant and returned to Britain after the French Revolution. Having displayed remarkable powers as a boy, demonstrating skills with fireworks at Lostwithiel, he was sent after finishing grammar school to study medicine at the University of Edinburgh. Here he was inspired by the chemist Joseph Black. He qualified as MD in 1793, and then entered the army as assistant surgeon. Attaching himself to the artillery, he became chemist to the board of ordnance (1803). He still continued, however, to practice for a time as a physician, and during the years 1807–1811 he resided at Blackheath and joined the newly founded Geological Society of London. He assisted ordnance chemist Cruickshank who taught at the Royal Military Academy and when Cruickshank was declared insane in 1804 took over his teaching position. He also taught cadets at Addiscombe from 1814 and made use of his textbook A Geological Classification of Rocks (1811). In 1811 he communicated his first papers to the Geological Society of London. They were devoted to an elucidation of the geological structure of Guernsey, of the Channel Islands, and of Heligoland.

The evidence they afforded of his capacity, and the fact that he already had received a scientific appointment, probably led to his being selected in the same year to make some geological and mineralogical investigations in Scotland. He was in 1809 to identify limestone suitable for use in gunpowder making. He was also consulted on the suitability of the chief Scottish mountains for a repetition of the pendulum experiments previously conducted by Nevil Maskelyne and John Playfair at Schiehallion, and on the deviations of the plumb-line along the meridian of the Trigonometrical Survey. In the course of the explorations necessary for the purposes of these reports he made extensive observations on the geology and mineralogy of Scotland. He formed also a collection of the mineral productions and rocks of that country, which he presented to the Geological Society in 1814. In that year he was appointed geologist to the Trigonometrical Survey; and in 1816–1818 he was president of the Geological Society.

Comparatively little had been done in the investigation of Scottish geology, and finding the field so full of promise, he devoted himself to its cultivation with great ardour. One of his most important labours was the examination of the whole range of islands along the west of Scotland, at that time not easily visited, and presenting many obstacles to a scientific explorer. The results of this survey appeared (1819) in the form of his Description of the Western Islands of Scotland, including the Isle of Man (2 vols. 8vo, with an atlas of plates in 4to), which formed one of the classical treatises on British geology. He appears to have been for a time on the board of the Quarterly Journal of Science, Literature and the Arts, which was published at the Royal Institution of Great Britain.

He was elected a fellow of the Royal Society in 1820. He continued to write papers, chiefly on the rocks and minerals of Scotland, and had at last gathered so large an amount of information that the government was prevailed upon in the year 1826 to employ him in the preparation of a geological map of Scotland. From that date up to the time of his death he returned each summer to Scotland and traversed every district of the kingdom, inserting the geological features upon Arrowsmith's map, the only one then available for his purpose. He completed the field-work in 1832, and in 1834 his map and memoir were ready for publication, but these were not issued until 1836, the year after he died.

Among his other works the following may be mentioned: A Geological Classification of Rocks with Descriptive Synopses of the Species and Varieties, comprising the Elements of Practical Geology (1821); The Highlands and Western Isles of Scotland, in a series of letters to Sir Walter Scott (4 vols., 1824); A System of Geology, with a Theory of the Earth and an Examination of its Connection with the Sacred Records (2 vols. 1831); Proofs and Illustrations of the Attributes of God, from the Facts and Laws of the Physical Universe: Being the Foundation of Natural and Revealed Religion (3 vols. 1837). He also studied marsh fevers or miasmas and introduced the word "malaria" into English in 1827 and examined its distribution from a topographical perspective. He married Louisa Margaretta White of Addiscombe and during his honeymoon in Cornwall he fell from a carriage and sustained multiple fractures to his right leg. His leg was amputated and during this period he continued his researches and even guided the surgeons who treated him. He died in hospital a few days later and was buried at Gulval.

== See also ==
- Henrietta Clive, Countess of Powis
