= Aberconway Medal =

The Aberconway Medal is a medal of the Geological Society of London, formerly awarded annually by the Institution of Geologists. Since 1991, when the institution of geologists merged with the society, the medal has been awarded biennally by the Geological Society. The award was established with a gift from English China Clays and its chairman Charles McLaren, 3rd Baron Aberconway.

It is normally awarded to individuals with no more than 25 years full-time equivalent experience to recognise distinction in the practice of applied or economic geology with special reference to work in industry.

== Aberconway Medallists ==
Source: Geological Society

=== Awarded by the Institution of Geologists ===
- 1980 Daniel Clark Ion
- 1981 Peter Gaffney
- 1982 David Burton
- 1983 Wallace Spencer Pitcher
- 1984 Robert Cummings
- 1985 Douglas Bassett
- 1986 Sir Kingsley Dunham
- 1987 Frederick Brassington
- 1988 Richard Fox
- 1989 Sir John Knill
- 1990 John Lloyd
- 1991 Richard Christopher Wilson

=== Awarded by the Geological Society ===
- 1992 Stephen Henley
- 1994 Malcolm Butler
- 1996 Richard Hubbard
- 1998 David Savage
- 2000 Jonathan Gluyas
- 2002 Andrew Mackenzie
- 2004 Jeremy Giles
- 2006 Robert Holdsworth
- 2008 Richard Davies
- 2011 Rebecca Lunn
- 2013 Peter Burgess
- 2015 Stuart Archer
- 2017 not awarded
- 2018 Charlotte Adams
- 2019 Andrea Cozzi
- 2021 Caroline Gill
- 2023 Andrew Hart
- 2025 Gavin Foster

== See also ==
- List of geology awards
