= Brian Windley =

British geologist (1936–2025)

Brian Frederick Windley
- Born: 19 January 1936
- Died: 6 March 2025 (aged 89); Great Malvern, Worcestershire, England
- Education: University of Liverpool, University of Exeter
- Known for: The Evolving Continents
- Awards: Bigsby Medal (1977); Murchison Medal (1985)
- Scientific career
- Fields: Geology
- Workplaces: Geological Survey of Greenland, University of Leicester

Brian Frederick Windley (19 January 1936 – 6 March 2025 in Great Malvern) was a British geologist. He was Emeritus Professor of Geology at the University of Leicester.

Educated at the University of Liverpool and University of Exeter, he began his career with the Geological Survey of Greenland in 1963. Windley is perhaps best known for his textbook The Evolving Continents, first published in 1977 with new editions in 1984 and 1995.

Among his awards are the Bigsby Medal (1977) and the Murchison Medal (1985) from the Geological Society of London, and the Leopold von Buch Medal of the German Geological Society, DGGV (2016). According to Google Scholar he has a h-index of 104.
