= J. Michael Bishop =

American immunologist and microbiologist (1936–2026)

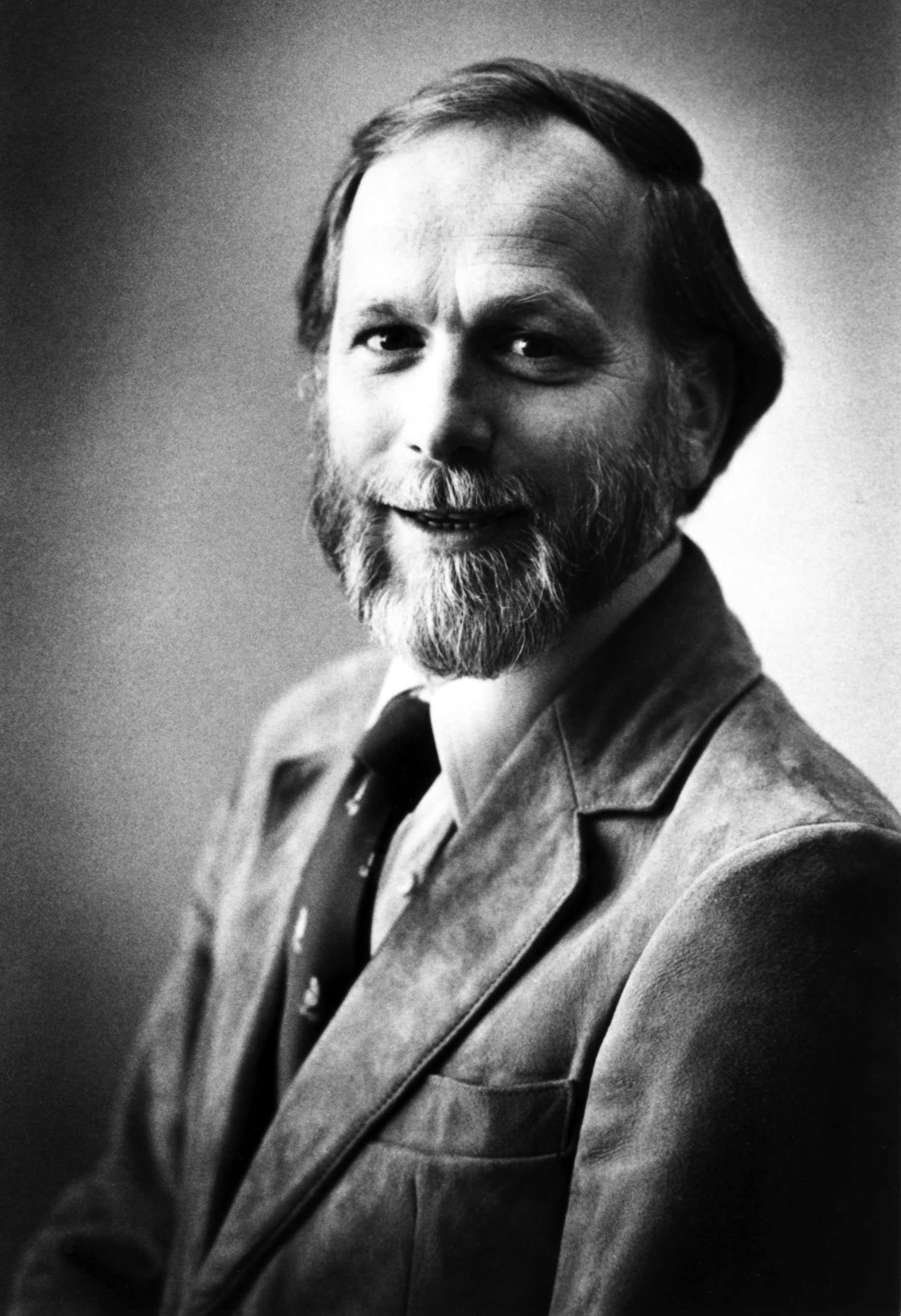
- Born: John Michael Bishop; February 22, 1936; York, Pennsylvania, U.S.
- Died: March 20, 2026 (aged 90); San Francisco, California, U.S.
- Education: Gettysburg College (Bachelors); Harvard University (MD)
- Known for: Oncogene Virus
- Awards: Dickson Prize (1986); Nobel Prize in Physiology or Medicine (1989); ASCB Public Service Award (1998); National Medal of Science (2003); Clark Kerr Award (2020)
- Scientific career
- Fields: Virology
- Workplaces: University of California, San Francisco; Heinrich Pette Institute; National Institute of Allergy and Infectious Diseases
- Website: profiles.ucsf.edu/j.michael.bishop

John Michael Bishop (February 22, 1936 – March 20, 2026) was an American immunologist and microbiologist who shared the 1989 Nobel Prize in Physiology or Medicine with Harold E. Varmus. He was a faculty member at the University of California, San Francisco (UCSF), where he also served as chancellor from 1998 to 2009.

== Early life and education ==
Bishop was born in York, Pennsylvania, on February 22, 1936. He attended Gettysburg College as an undergraduate, where he was a brother of the Theta-Pi Zeta chapter of Lambda Chi Alpha fraternity. He later attended Harvard University Medical School, where he earned an MD in 1962.

== Career ==
Bishop began his career working for the National Institute of Allergy and Infectious Diseases, a part of the National Institutes of Health. He then spent a year working for the Heinrich Pette Institute in Hamburg, Germany, before joining the faculty of the University of California, San Francisco, in 1968. Bishop remained on the school's faculty from 1968 on, and was chancellor of the university from 1998 to 2009. He was director of the Bishop Lab.

He became the eighth chancellor of UCSF in 1998. He oversaw one of UCSF's major transition and growth periods, including the expanding Mission Bay development and philanthropic support recruitment. During his tenure, he unveiled the first comprehensive, campus-wide, strategic plan to promote diversity and foster a supportive work environment. During this time, UCSF also adopted a new mission: advancing health worldwide™.

== Research ==
Much of this work was conducted jointly with Harold Varmus in a notably long scientific partnership. Their best-known accomplishment was the identification of a cellular gene (c-src) that gave rise to the v-src oncogene of Rous Sarcoma Virus, a cancer-causing virus first isolated from a chicken sarcoma by Peyton Rous in 1910. Their discovery was soon followed by the identification of many other cellular proto-oncogenes—progenitors of viral oncogenes and targets for mutations that drive human cancers.

== Death ==
Bishop died from pneumonia in San Francisco on March 20, 2026, at the age of 90.

== Awards and honors ==
Bishop was best known for his Nobel-winning work on retroviral oncogenes. Working with Harold E. Varmus in the 1980s, he discovered the first human oncogene, c-Src. Their findings allowed the understanding of how malignant tumors are formed from changes to the normal genes of a cell. These changes can be produced by viruses, by radiation, or by exposure to some chemicals.

He was a member of the National Academy of Sciences, the American Academy of Arts and Sciences, and the American Philosophical Society.

Bishop was also a recipient of National Medal of Science in 2003. That same year, his book How to win the Nobel Prize: An Unexpected Life in Science (LCCN 2002-192234) was published. He was elected Foreign Member of the Royal Society (ForMemRS) in 2008. In 2020, Bishop received from the UC Berkeley Academic Senate the Clark Kerr Award for distinguished leadership in higher education.

== Archival collections ==
The University of California, San Francisco, Archives and Special Collections houses a collection of J. Michael Bishop papers, including his laboratory research notebooks, writings, photographs, and other material.

Preceded by Ursula Goodenough	ASCB Presidents; 1996	Succeeded by Mina Bissell
