= Rebecca Lunn =

Geoscientist

Becky Lunn MBE FRSE FREng FICE
- Born: Rebecca Jane Lunn
- Education: University of Cambridge (BA); Newcastle University (PhD)
- Awards: Aberconway Medal (2011)
- Scientific career
- Fields: Geosciences
- Workplaces: Newcastle University; University of Edinburgh; Heriot Watt University; University of Strathclyde
- Thesis: A nitrogen modelling system for large river basins (1995)
- Website: www.strath.ac.uk/staff/lunnrebeccaprof

Rebecca Jane Lunn is a British geologist who is a professor and Head of the Centre for Ground Engineering and Energy Geosciences and Department of Civil and Environmental Engineering at the University of Strathclyde.

Lunn studies flow and transport systems in the shallow crust in an effort to characterise uncertainty in nuclear waste disposal,.

Lunn developed techniques to monitor microseismic activity at depths of several kilometres. She has also investigated self-healing grouts, She researches bacterials and microbial populations in prosthetic liners; research has also considered the development of cheap, safe and comfortable prosthetic limbs.

Lunn leads two Engineering and Physical Sciences Research Council (EPSRC) Nuclear Waste consortia: Biogeochemical Applications in Nuclear Decommissioning and Waste Disposal (BANDD) and Systems Approach For Engineered (SAFE) Barriers. The BANDD consortia includes the investigation of biomineralisation to seal radionuclides and to seal rock fractures. SAFE (a £1.3 M EPSRC programme) developed technology that can monitor thermo-hydro-mechanical-chemical reaction (THMC) variables, including pH, temperature, pressure and swelling.

Lunn has researched two main problems in civil engineering; post-war infrastructure and globally unsustainable construction methods. Lunn researches post-war infrastructure in regards to the 50 year design life, trying to minimize the damage caused by the continually degrading and increasingly hazardous structures. She is presently involved in a project that aims to reduce the USE of global cement and concrete, through a process called Microbially Induced Calcite Precipitation technique (MICP). The sponsoring of the Royal Academy of Engineering and the civil Engineering Contractor, BAM Nuttal, has allowed research yielding results of turning soil into a solid state to be placed into the civil engineering market. She has developed most of this research at the University of Strathclyde.

== Early life and education ==
Lunn studied the Mathematical Tripos at the University of Cambridge. Motivated to make a larger impact by helping people and solving issues, she moved to Newcastle University for her postgraduate studies, earning a master's degree in Science and a PhD in Engineering for research on modelling large drainage basins in 1995.

== Career and research ==
Lunn remained at Newcastle University as a postdoctoral research associate, modelling systems for groundwater and mineral transport, until 1997 and .

Lunn joined the University of Edinburgh as a lecturer in 1997. She moved to Heriot-Watt University in October 2000. In 2005 Lunn joined the University of Strathclyde. She was made Professor of Civil Engineering in 2010 and Head of Department in 2011.

In 2013 she participated on the UK Government’s Ad Hoc Advisory Board on Nuclear Research and Development, which gave guidance to the government on this subject matter. She is presently working on geothermal energy production as a member of the Scottish Government Working Group.

She is a member of the Decommissioning, Immobilisation and Storage soluTIons for NuClear wasTe InVEntories (DISTINCTIVE) collaboration.

Over the years, professor Lunn has participated in highly multi-disciplinary research and has collaborated with other scientists such as seismologists, microbiologists, material scientists, and electronic engineers, amongst others.

In 2011 she was the first woman to be made the Head of an Engineering Department in Scotland.

She was the first woman and engineer to win Geological society's the Aberconway Medal in 2011 for her research with the nuclear industry.

In 2015, she was the only engineer or scientist to be named as one of 10 “Outstanding women of Scotland” by Saltire Society, as a recognition for her support of women in science and engineering and research efforts.

Lunn's work contributes to 10 of the United Nations 17 global Sustainable Developmental Goals; Gender Equality, Clean Water and Sanitation, Affordable and Clean Energy, Industry Innovation and Infrastructure, Sustainable Cities and Communities, Responsible Consumption and Production, Climate Action, Life Below Water, Life on Land and Peace Justice and Strong Institutions.

=== Policy and academic service ===
In 2009 Lunn was appointed to the Government of the United Kingdom Committee on Radioactive Waste Management. She delivered a public lecture about challenges of disposing of radioactive waste. Lunn served as a member of the Royal Society of Edinburgh inquiry into the future of energy in Scotland. The inquiry looks to assess energy demand in Scotland and investigate how the energy demand may be met. Lunn also serves on the EPSRC engineering Research Council’s Strategic Advisory Team.

Lunn is engaged in activities to improve gender balance in science. She is an advocate for the inclusion of women in the fields of science and engineering and was invited onto the Royal Society of Edinburgh Working Group on Women in Science, technology, engineering, and mathematics (STEM), who produced a report to Scottish Ministers in 2012. The report, Tapping All Out Talents, made a series of recommendations, including ensuring that universities obtained an Athena SWAN Silver Award and encourage shared parental leave. The report was revised in 2018, encouraging behavioural change across the sector. In 2024, Lunn has continued to advocate for Women in STEM by contributing to research article; A holistic understanding of inclusion in STEM: Systemic challenges and support for women and LGBT+ academics and PhD students, detailing intersectional inequalities within the field of stem using qualitative research while presenting two models to simplify the discrimination. Lunn is Programme Director on the EPSRC (Engineering and Physical Science Research Council) Inclusion Matters project STEM Equals. The proposal looks to build initiatives for LGBT scientists and engineers at the University of Strathclyde.

=== Awards and honours ===
Her awards and honours include:

- 2021 Best paper award at the Resilient Materials 4 Life Conference
- 2018 Elected a Fellow of the Royal Academy of Engineering (FREng)
- 2017 Appointed Member of the British Empire (MBE) in the 2017 Birthday Honours
- 2015 Saltire Society Outstanding Women of Scotland
- 2014 Elected a Fellow of the Institution of Civil Engineers (FICE)
- 2014 Elected a Fellow of the Royal Society of Edinburgh (FRSE)
- 2014 WISE Campaign Leadership Award (shortlisted)
- 2011 Awarded the Aberconway Medal by the Geological Society of London

=== Selected publications ===
- McKay, Lucy, Shipton, Zoe K, Lunn, Rebecca J, Andrews, Billy, Raub, Timothy D, & Boyce, Adrian J. (2019). Detailed internal structure and along-strike variability of the core of a plate boundary fault; the Highland Boundary Fault, Scotland. Journal of the Geological Society, 177(2), 283–296. https://doi.org/10.1144/jgs2018-226
- Romano, Carla, Minto, James M, Shipton, Zoe K, & Lunn, Rebecca J. (2019). Automated high accuracy, rapid beam hardening correction in X-Ray Computed Tomography of multi-mineral, heterogeneous core samples. Computers & Geosciences, 131, 144–157. https://doi.org/10.1016/j.cageo.2019.06.009
- Bots, Pieter, Renshaw, Joanna C, Payne, Timothy E, Comarmond, M. Josick, Schellenger, Alexandra E. P, Pedrotti, Matteo, Calì, Eleonora, & Lunn, Rebecca J. (2020). Geochemical evidence for the application of nanoparticulate colloidal silica gel for in situ containment of legacy nuclear wastes. Environmental Science. Nano, 7(5), 1481–1495. https://doi.org/10.1039/D0EN00046A
- Pedrotti, Matteo, Wong, Christopher, El Mountassir, Gráinne, Renshaw, Joanna C, & Lunn, Rebecca J. (2020). Desiccation behaviour of colloidal silica grouted sand: A new material for the creation of near surface hydraulic barriers. Engineering Geology, 270, 105579. https://doi.org/10.1016/j.enggeo.2020.105579
- Romano, Carla R, Zahasky, Christopher, Garing, Charlotte, Minto, James M, Benson, Sally M, Shipton, Zoe K, & Lunn, Rebecca J. (2020). Subcore Scale Fluid Flow Behavior in a Sandstone With Cataclastic Deformation Bands. Water Resources Research, 56(4). https://doi.org/10.1029/2019WR026715
- Stillings, M, Lunn, R. J, Pytharouli, S, Shipton, Z. K, Kinali, M, Lord, R, & Thompson, S. (2021). Microseismic Events Cause Significant pH Drops in Groundwater. Geophysical Research Letters, 48(2).https://doi.org/10.1029/2020GL089885
- Yfantis, G, Pytharouli, S, Lunn, R.J, & Carvajal, H.E.M. (2021). Microseismic monitoring illuminates phases of slope failure in soft soils. Engineering Geology, 280, 105940. https://doi.org/10.1016/j.enggeo.2020.105940
