= Geoffrey King (geophysicist) =

British geophysicist

Geoffrey Charles Plume King (26 December 1943 – 19 April 2026) was a British geophysicist. He last worked as Senior Research Professor in the Tectonics Laboratory of the Institut de Physique du Globe de Paris, and Honorary Professor at the University of York.

== Early life and education ==
King was born in the Protectorate of Uganda — his father was working there at the time with the Uganda Geology Survey. He earned a first-class degree in Applied Physics from Durham University in 1965 and completed his PhD at Churchill College, Cambridge in 1969.

== Career and research ==
King was a staff member of the Department of Geophysics at Cambridge, where he worked on designing and constructing geophysical instruments. He moved to the United States in 1986, and was employed by the US Geological Survey in Denver and Menlo Park for five years. He also held a concurrent role as an Associate Professor at the University of Colorado Boulder from 1987 to 1991. He conducted research in active tectonics at the Institut de Physique du Globe de Strasbourg from 1990 to 1995, at which point he joined the Institut de Physique du Globe de Paris. He retired in 2015.

He is known in particular for his 1994 Bulletin of the Seismological Society of America paper co-written with Ross Stein and Jian Lin on stress movements in between earthquakes, which was the most heavily-cited earthquake study that decade. Using data from the 1992 Landers earthquake and the Big Bear earthquake that followed hours later, he and his collaborators found that the stress distribution from the first earthquake controlled the distribution of the aftershock sequence. This finding upended the then conventional view that earthquakes only released "the stress immediately around them" and made Earthquake prediction easier in future.

== Personal life and death ==
King had one daughter. He died in London on 19 April 2026, aged 82, after a long period of failing health.

== Selected articles ==
- King, G. C. P.; Nábělek, J. (1985). "Role of fault bends in the initiation and termination of earthquake rupture". Science. 228 (4702): 984–987. doi:10.1126/science.228.4702.984.
- Stein, Ross S.; King, G. C. P.; Lin, Jiang (1992). "Change in failure stress on the southern San Andreas fault system caused by the 1992 magnitude=7.4 Landers earthquake". Science. 258 (5086): 1328–1332. doi:10.1126/science.258.5086.1328.
- Wood, R. M.; King, G. C. P. (1993). "Hydrological signatures of earthquake strain" (PDF). Journal of Geophysical Research. 98 (B12): 22035–22068. doi:10.1029/93JB02219.
- King, G. C. P.; Stein, Ross S.; Lin, Jiang (1994). "Static stress changes and the triggering of earthquakes" (PDF). Bulletin of the Seismological Society of America. 84 (3): 935–953. doi:10.1785/BSSA0840030935.
- King, G. C. P.; Cocco, Massimo (2001). "Fault interaction by elastic stress changes: New clues from earthquake sequences". Advances in Geophysics. 44: 1–38. doi:10.1016/S0065-2687(00)80006-0.
