= Daniela Schmidt =

German earth scientist and academic

Daniela Schmidt FRSB
- Born: Daniela N. Schmidt
- Education: University of Bremen; ETH Zurich (PhD)
- Awards: Royal Society University Research Fellowship (2006); Royal Society Wolfson Research Merit Award (2015); Bigsby Medal (2024)
- Scientific career
- Fields: Climate change Marine ecosystems
- Workplaces: Royal Holloway, University of London; University of Bristol
- Thesis: Size variability in planktic foraminifers (2002)
- Website: research-information.bris.ac.uk/en/persons/daniela-n-schmidt

Daniela N. Schmidt FRSB is a German earth scientist and professor at the University of Bristol. Her research investigates the impact of climate change on marine ecosystems. She is the lead author for the Intergovernmental Panel on Climate Change (IPCC) report on Impacts, Adaptation and Vulnerability for Europe.

== Early life and education ==
Schmidt completed her undergraduate training at the University of Bremen, where she specialised in geology and palaeontology. During her degree she took part in a RV Polarstern mission to the Bellingshausen Sea. She earned her PhD at ETH Zurich where she studied the macroecology of planktic foraminifers. Her thesis was awarded the ETH Zurich Medal, and Schmidt was awarded a Swiss National Science Foundation Fellowship.

== Research and career ==
After earning her doctorate in 2002 she moved to Royal Holloway, University of London as a German Research Foundation Fellow. Schmidt started her independent scientific career as a Royal Society University Research Fellow at the University of Bristol in 2006.

Schmidt was awarded a Royal Society Wolfson Research Fellowship in 2015. Her research investigates the causes and impacts of increased carbon dioxide on marine ecosystems. Anthropological carbon dioxide emissions impact the ocean in many ways, resulting in processes such as ocean acidification and warming. Damage to the ocean directly and indirectly impacts the environment, and ecosystem shifts can present considerable challenges to surrounding communities. Schmidt has investigated various ocean ecosystems, with a focus on bivalves, bryozoans and foraminifera.

In general, her research combines understanding climate events with modern activity to understand and assess risk. She was a lead author for the Intergovernmental Panel on Climate Change Working Group on Impacts, Adaptation and Vulnerability.

=== Awards and honours ===
- Elected a Fellow of the Royal Society of Biology (FRSB)
- 2015 Elected to AcademiaNet
- 2016 Elected to the Young Academy of Europe
- 2024 Bigsby Medal of the Geological Society of London
- 2024 President's Medal of the Palaeontological Association

=== Select publications ===
- Bärbel Hönisch; Andy Ridgwell; Daniela N Schmidt; et al. (2 March 2012). "The geological record of ocean acidification". Science. 335 (6072): 1058–63. Bibcode:2012Sci...335.1058H. doi:10.1126/science.1208277. ISSN 0036-8075. PMID 22383840. Wikidata Q28261134.
- Osamu Seki; Gavin L. Foster; Daniela N. Schmidt; Andreas Mackensen; Kimitaka Kawamura; Richard D. Pancost (15 March 2010). "Alkenone and boron-based Pliocene pCO2 records". Earth and Planetary Science Letters. 292 (1–2): 201–211. Bibcode:2010E&PSL.292..201S. doi:10.1016/j.epsl.2010.01.037. ISSN 0012-821X. Wikidata Q53100350.
- Andy Ridgwell; Daniela N. Schmidt (14 February 2010). "Past constraints on the vulnerability of marine calcifiers to massive carbon dioxide release". Nature Geoscience. 3 (3): 196–200. doi:10.1038/ngeo755. ISSN 1752-0894. Wikidata Q53100355.
