= Paleoceanography =

Study of the oceans in the geologic past

Paleoceanography is the study of the history of the oceans in the geologic past with regard to biology, chemistry, circulation, geology, and patterns of biological productivity and sedimentation. Paleoceanographic studies using environment models and different proxies enable the scientific community to assess the role of the oceanic processes in the global climate by the re-construction of past climate at various intervals. Paleoceanographic research is also intimately tied to paleoclimatology.

== Source and methods of information ==
Life timeline
← / Earth formed; ← / Earliest water; ← / LUCA; ← / Earliest fossils; ← / Great Oxygenation Event; ← / Sexual reproduction; ← / Earliest fungi; ← / Neoproterozoic oxygenation event; ← / Ediacaran biota; ← / Cambrian explosion; ← / Earliest tetrapods; ← / Earliest hominoid
(million years ago)

Paleoceanography makes use of so-called proxy methods as a way to infer information about the past state and evolution of the world's oceans. Proxies provide an indirect method for studying a given aspect of the ocean in the past. Several geochemical proxy tools include long-chain organic molecules (e.g. alkenones), stable and radioactive isotopes, and trace metals. Additionally, sediment cores rich with fossils and shells (tests) can also be useful; the field of paleoceanography is closely related to sedimentology and paleontology.

=== Sea-surface temperature ===
Sea-surface temperature (SST) records can be extracted from deep-sea sediment cores using oxygen isotope ratios and the ratio of magnesium to calcium (Mg/Ca) in shell secretions from plankton, from long-chain organic molecules such as alkenone, from tropical corals near the sea surface, and from mollusk shells.

Oxygen isotope ratios (δ^{18}O) are useful in reconstructing SST because of the influence temperature has on the isotope ratio. Plankton take up oxygen in building their shells and will be less enriched in their δ^{18}O when formed in warmer waters, provided they are in thermodynamic equilibrium with the seawater. When these shells precipitate, they sink and form sediments on the ocean floor whose δ^{18}O can be used to infer past SSTs. Oxygen isotope ratios are not perfect proxies, however. The volume of ice trapped in continental ice sheets can have an impact of the δ^{18}O. Freshwater characterized by lower values of δ^{18}O becomes trapped in the continental ice sheets, so that during glacial periods seawater δ^{18}O is elevated and calcite shells formed during these times will have a larger δ^{18}O value.

The substitution of magnesium in place of calcium in CaCO_{3} shells can be used as a proxy for the SST in which the shells formed. Mg/Ca ratios have several other influencing factors other than temperature, such as vital effects, shell-cleaning, and postmortem and post-depositional dissolution effects, to name a few. Other influences aside, Mg/Ca ratios have successfully quantified the tropical cooling that occurred during the last glacial period.

Alkenones are long-chain, complex organic molecules produced by photosynthetic algae. They are temperature sensitive and can be extracted from marine sediments. Use of alkenones represents a more direct relationship between SST and algae and does not rely on knowing biotic and physical-chemical thermodynamic relationships needed in CaCO_{3} studies. Another advantage of using alkenones is that they are a product of photosynthesis, necessitating formation in the sunlight of the upper surface layers. As such, it better records near-surface SST.

=== Bottom-water temperature ===
The most commonly used proxy to infer deep-sea temperature history are the Mg/Ca ratios in benthic foraminifera and ostracodes. The temperatures inferred from the Mg/Ca ratios have confirmed an up to 3 °C cooling of the deep ocean during the late Pleistocene glacial periods. One notable study is that by Lear et al. [2002] who worked to calibrate bottom water temperature to Mg/Ca ratios in 9 locations covering a variety of depths from up to six different benthic foraminifera (depending on location). The authors found an equation calibrating bottom water temperature of Mg/Ca ratios that takes on an exponential form:

$$\mathrm{Mg/Ca} = 0.867 \pm 0.049*\exp(0.109 \pm 0.007*\mathrm{BWT})
:$$

where Mg/Ca is the Mg/Ca ratio found in the benthic foraminifera and BWT is the bottom water temperature.

=== Use of Sediment Records ===
Sediment records have been used to make inferences about the past and predictions about the future, and has been used in Paleoceanography research since the 1930s. Modern time scale reconstructive research has advanced using sediment core-scanning methods. These methods have enabled research similar to that conducted with ice core records in Antarctica. These records can inform on the relative abundance of organisms present at a given time using paleoproductivity methods such as measuring the total diatom abundance. Records can also inform on historic weather patterns and ocean circulation such as Deschamps et al. described with their research into sediment records from the Chukchi-Alaskan and Canadian Beaufort Margins.

=== Biological Activity and Carbon Drawdown ===
Several proxies exist, to varying degrees of confidence and accuracy, for the extent and type of biological activity occurring in the ocean at a given period of time. As mentioned above, sediment records are often a critical tool for paleoceanographic studies, as they provide an opportunity to create a time series of a given property in how they record parameters of interest (essentially, capturing what was occurring in the ocean at a given time) as 'stuff' (whether it be things like sand, silt, clay or pieces of dead fish, fish poop, and plankton, etc.) falls to the seafloor over time. Researchers take what is called a 'core' in which they take a giant, long, straw-like cookie cutter, and push it into the seafloor sediment and bring it back to the surface. Now they have a tube of 'mud', with the lower layers representing older oceans and the upper layers representing younger oceans; using a host of different methods, scientists can assign a date to each layer, and create a time series of their target parameter. This section explores the use of one type of proxy taken from sediment cores which utilizes geochemical techniques to reconstruct biology, as well as climate conditions at the time of deposition (see paleoclimate).

Tracking the Extent of Biological Activity By Tracking Their Food

Various forms of nutrients exist in the ocean, often to predictable ratios (see Redfield Ratio). One of the major nutrients in the ocean is nitrogen (N). The total availability and distribution of bioavailable forms of nitrogen (N) in the surface ocean are considered a major constraint on global primary production. In turn, nitrogen dynamics largely influence the cycling of other essential elements like carbon and oxygen which also shape Earth's climate and overall biogeochemistry. The absolute requirement for nitrogen by biology makes observations of surface N (or, how much food there is in the part of the ocean in which most of the base of the food chain lives) and uptake by phytoplankton (the base of the food chain) useful and important for our understanding of how much biology in the ocean has changed over time, more specifically examining the biological carbon pump through time. To do so, paleoceanographic studies have reconstructed marine N histories by taking advantage of the predictable isotopic signatures imparted on different N pools and biology through the various transformations that occur as part of the marine N cycle.

The transfer of the surface ocean nutrient N signal into an observable record typically starts with uptake, or assimilation of N via photosynthesis and the incorporation of N into biomass that may ultimately be buried at the seafloor. Nitrate, the most abundant form of bioavailable N in the ocean, naturally occurs in two forms, bearing either of the two stable isotopes of N, 14N or 15N. The ratio of these isotopes is described by the value δ15N (where δ15N = 1,000 * ((15N/14Nsample)/(15N/14Nstandard)) − 1; the standard is atmospheric N2. During their life processes, phytoplankton preferentially take up the lighter isotope-bearing nitrate (incorporating it into their tissues/biomass) because it is energetically easier, and leave the heavier isotope bearing nitrate behind. As a result, the more the nutrient pool is used, the more the pool of unused nutrients becomes heavier. The organisms utilizing the pool also become heavier over time, as they take up nitrate from a pool that is heavier and heavier. This fractionation associated with nutrient uptake is systematic such that it leads to a predictable relationship between the isotopic composition of the water column nitrate pool and that of the phytoplankton's organic matter in settings where nutrients are not completely consumed. As organisms die and the organic matter sinks out of the water column, it carries this isotopic fingerprint into the sediment. (Note that there may be offsets/adjustments to this signal throughout the sinking and sedimentation processes; this is a subject of ongoing paleoceanographic investigation, but largely the spatial variations from the surface ocean are preserved in the sediments thus forming the basis for the use of sedimentary δ15N records as a biogeochemical proxy for utilization/biology/primary production.)

=== Salinity ===
Salinity is a more challenging quantity to infer from paleorecords. Deuterium excess in core records can provide a better inference of sea-surface salinity than oxygen isotopes, and certain species, such as diatoms, can provide a semiquantitative salinity record due to the relative abundances of diatoms that are limited to certain salinity regimes. There have been changes to global water cycle and the salinity balance of the oceans with the North Atlantic and becoming more saline and the sub-tropical Indian and pacific oceans becoming less so. With changes to the water cycle, there have also been variations with the vertical distribution of salt and haloclines. Large incursions of freshwater and changing salinity can also contribute to a reduction in sea ice extent.

=== Ocean circulation ===
Several proxy methods have been used to infer past ocean circulation and changes to it. They include carbon isotope ratios, cadmium/calcium (Cd/Ca) ratios, protactinium/thorium isotopes (^{231}Pa and ^{230}Th), radiocarbon activity (δ^{14}C), neodymium isotopes (^{143}Nd and ^{144}Nd), and sortable silt (fraction of deep-sea sediment between 10 and 63 μm). Carbon isotope and cadmium/calcium ratio proxies are used because variability in their ratios is due partly to changes in bottom-water chemistry, which is in turn related the source of deep-water formation. These ratios, however, are influenced by biological, ecological, and geochemical processes which complicate circulation inferences.

All proxies included are useful in inferring the behavior of the meridional overturning circulation. For example, McManus et al. [2004] used protactinium/thorium isotopes (^{231}Pa and ^{230}Th) to show that the Atlantic Meridional Overturning Circulation had been nearly (or completely) shut off during the last glacial period. ^{231}Pa and ^{230}Th are both formed from the radioactive decay of dissolved uranium in seawater, with ^{231}Pa able to remain supported in the water column longer than ^{230}Th: ^{231}Pa has a residence time ~100–200 years while ^{230}Th has one ~20–40 years. In today's Atlantic Ocean and current overturning circulation, ^{230}Th transport to the Southern Ocean is minimal due to its short residence time, and ^{231}Pa transport is high. This results in relatively low ^{231}Pa / ^{230}Th ratios found by McManus et al. [2004] in a core at 33N 57W, and a depth of 4.5 km. When the overturning circulation shuts down (as hypothesized) during glacial periods, the ^{231}Pa / ^{230}Th ratio becomes elevated due to the lack of removal of ^{231}Pa to the Southern Ocean. McManus et al. [2004] also note a small raise in the ^{231}Pa / ^{230}Th ratio during the Younger Dryas event, another period in climate history thought to have experienced a weakening overturning circulation.

=== Acidity, pH, and alkalinity ===
Boron isotope ratios (δ^{11}B) can be used to infer both recent as well as millennial time scale changes in the acidity, pH, and alkalinity of the ocean, which is mainly forced by atmospheric CO_{2} concentrations and bicarbonate ion concentration in the ocean. δ^{11}B has been identified in corals from the southwestern Pacific to vary with ocean pH, and shows that climate variabilities such as the Pacific decadal oscillation (PDO) can modulate the impact of ocean acidification due to rising atmospheric CO_{2} concentrations. Another application of δ^{11}B in plankton shells can be used as an indirect proxy for atmospheric CO_{2} concentrations over the past several million years.

== See also ==
- Oceanography – Scientific study of the ocean
- Paleoclimatology – Study of changes in ancient climate
- Paleogeography – Study of physical geography of past landscapes
- Paleothermometer — Study of ancient temperatures
- Paleomaps – Maps showing the past shapes of continents
