= Basil Charles King =

British geologist and author (1915–1985)

Basil Charles King FRSE
- Born: 1 June 1915
- Died: 11 September 1985 (aged 70)
- Spouse: Dorothy Margaret Wells (m. 1939)
- Awards: Bigsby Medal (1959)

Academic background
- Education: Durham University (BSc)

Basil Charles King FRSE (1915–1985) was a British geologist.

== Early life and education ==
King was educated at King Edward VI School, Bury St Edmunds, and went on to study geology at Durham University. He graduated in 1936 with first-class honours.

== Career and research ==
After graduating, King worked as a demonstrator at Bedford College, London, before joining the Geological Survey of Uganda. He later returned to Britain and joined the geology department at the University of Glasgow, where he became a senior lecturer. In 1956, he returned to Bedford College as professor of geology.

In 1950 he was elected a Fellow of the Royal Society of Edinburgh — his proposers were Neville George, John Weir, George Walter Tyrrell, and Arthur Holmes. He became a member of the Geological Society of London in 1949; they later awarded him the Bigsby Medal in 1959.

His health failing, King retired and moved to Catacol on the Isle of Arran in 1977.

== Personal life ==
King married Dorothy Margaret Wells in 1939, who predeceased him. They had four children, including the seismologist Geoffrey King.

He died on 11 September 1985.

== Selected publications ==
- King, Basil Charles (1954). "The Ard Bheinn Area of the Central Igneous Complex of Arran". Quarterly Journal of the Geological Society. 110 (1–4): 323–355. doi:10.1144/GSL.JGS.1954.110.01-04.15.
- ——— (1960). "The Form of the Beinn an Dubhaich Granite, Skye". Geological Magazine. 97 (4): 326–333. doi:10.1017/S0016756800061598.
- ———; Le Bas, Michael John; Sutherland, Diana Stephanie (1972). "The History of the Alkaline Volcanoes and Intrusive Complexes of Eastern Uganda and Western Kenya". Journal of the Geological Society. 128 (2): 173–190. doi:10.1144/gsjgs.128.2.0173.
