= Edward Howel Francis =

British geologist

Professor Edward Howel Francis FRSE FGS
- Born: 31 May 1924; South Wales, UK
- Died: 22 May 2014 (aged 89)
- Education: University College, Swansea
- Occupations: Geologist, Emeritus Professor of Earth Sciences

Edward Howel Francis (31 May 1924 – 22 May 2014) was a British geologist and Emeritus Professor of Earth Sciences at the University of Leeds. He was President of the Geological Society of London from 1980 to 1982.

== Biography ==
Francis was born in south Wales and went to school in Port Talbot. He was called up for military service after two years, commissioned in the Cheshire Regiment and served in the Mediterranean. After three years in the Army, he graduated from University College, Swansea (now Swansea University) in 1949. He joined the Institute of Geological Sciences (now the British Geological Survey) where he rose through the ranks from field geologist in Scotland to Assistant Director for Northern England and Wales, based in Leeds.

In 1977 Francis was appointed Professor of Earth Sciences at the University of Leeds. He retired from his chair with the title Emeritus Professor in 1989 and was awarded an Honorary Fellowship of University College, Swansea in the same year.

== Honours ==
- Fellowship of the Royal Society of Edinburgh (1962)
- Awarded the Murchison Fund of the Geological Society of London (1963)
- DSc, University of Wales (1969)
- Clough Medal of the Edinburgh Geological Society (1983)
- Sorby Medal of the Yorkshire Geological Society (1983)
- Major John Sacheverell A’Deane Coke Medal of the Geological Society of London (1989)

== Publications ==
- The Carboniferous period. Edward Howel Francis, B.SC., F.R.S.E., F.G.S. and Austin William Woodland, PH.D., F.G.S. Geological Society, London, Special Publications 1964, v. 1, p. 221-232.
- Caledonide volcanism in Britain and Ireland. C.J. Stillman and E.H. Francis. Geological Society, London, Special Publications 1979, v. 8, p. 555-577.
- Mid-Devonian to early Permian volcanism: Old World. E.H. Francis. Geological Society, London, Special Publications 1988, v. 38, p. 573-584.
