= John Sutton (geologist) =

English geologist (1919–1992)

John Sutton (8 July 1919 – 6 September 1992) was an English geologist.

Born in London into the family that established Suttons Seeds, John's father, John Gerald Sutton, was an engineer credited with inventing the motor lawn-mower, among other things, and his mother, Kathleen Richard, was a teacher of classics. In 1937 he began a general science degree at Imperial College, graduating in geology in 1941 with an Abbreviated Honours degree (not an Honours degree) for war service in the army.

From 1946–1949 he undertook research on the Lewisian gneiss of N.W.Scotland with fellow student Janet Watson. Both finished their PhDs, and married, in 1949. Their joint work on the Precambrian rocks of Scotland, which they first published in 1951 was highly influential. Sutton and Watson were later jointly recognised for this work with the awards of the Lyell Fund of the Geological Society of London in 1954, and of the Bigsby Medal in 1965.

Sutton was appointed Lecturer in the Department of Geology in 1948, before he had completed his PhD, and then spent the rest of his academic career at Imperial College. He was promoted to Reader in Geology in 1956, and Professor of Geology in 1958. In 1964, he became Head of Department, and was shortly afterwards appointed Dean of the Royal School of Mines (1965–68 and 1974–77). He played an important role in the establishment of the first cross-departmental interdisciplinary research centre at Imperial, the Interdepartmental Centre for Environmental Technology (ICCET), which he chaired for a while. In 1980, Sutton took on the role of Pro Rector of Imperial College. He retired in 1983, as Emeritus Professor.

Sutton took on many and influential administrative roles from the 1960s to the 1980s. He was member of the BAS Scientific Advisory Committee (1970–85); member of Natural Environment Research Council (1977–79) and Chairman, British National Committee on Antarctic Research, from 1979. He also served on numerous boards, committees and councils including the Royal Commission for the Exhibition of 1851, the Natural History Museum, London. He was elected President of the Geologists' Association for 1966–68. He was elected a Fellow of the Royal Society in 1966, serving as their Vice-President in 1975. John Sutton's archive of papers is held at Imperial College.

He died in 1992 and was buried in Martinstown, Dorset. He is commemorated by the Sutton Heights in Antarctica.

== Family ==
John Sutton and Janet Watson married in April 1949, and had two daughters who both died at birth. Janet Watson died in 1985, and John Sutton later married Betty Middleton-Sandford.
