= Richard Dixon Oldham =

British geologist

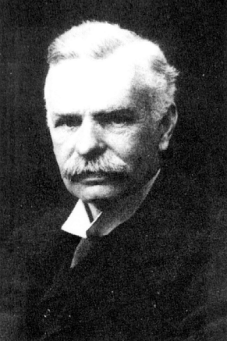
- Richard Dixon Oldham
- Born: 31 July 1858; Dublin, Ireland
- Died: 15 July 1936 (age 77)
- Known for: measuring Earth's core; separate arrival of seismic phases
- Scientific career
- Fields: Geology

Richard Dixon Oldham FRS (/ˈoʊldəm/; 31 July 1858 – 15 July 1936) was a British geologist who made the first clear identification of the separate arrivals of P-waves, S-waves and surface waves on seismograms and the first clear evidence that the Earth has a central core.

== Life ==
Born on 31 July 1858 to Thomas Oldham, a Fellow of the Royal Society and geologist, Oldham was educated at Rugby School and the Royal School of Mines (Imperial College London).

In 1879 Oldham became an assistant-superintendent with the Geological Survey of India, working in the Himalayas. He wrote about 40 publications for the Survey on geological subjects including hot springs, the geology of the Son Valley and the structure of the Himalayas and the Ganges plain. His most famous work was in seismology. His report on the 1897 Assam earthquake went far beyond reports of previous earthquakes. It included a description of the Chedrang fault, with uplift up to 35 feet and reported accelerations of the ground that had exceeded the Earth's gravitational acceleration. He also included accounts of earth-waves that could be seen travelling across the plain, and of waterspouts. During the cold season following the earthquake, the Survey carried out a re-triangulation of part of the area that had been initially surveyed in 1860. They found displacements of up to 12 feet both in distances and heights, substantially larger than could be due to errors. This was one of the earliest reports of such a re-survey.

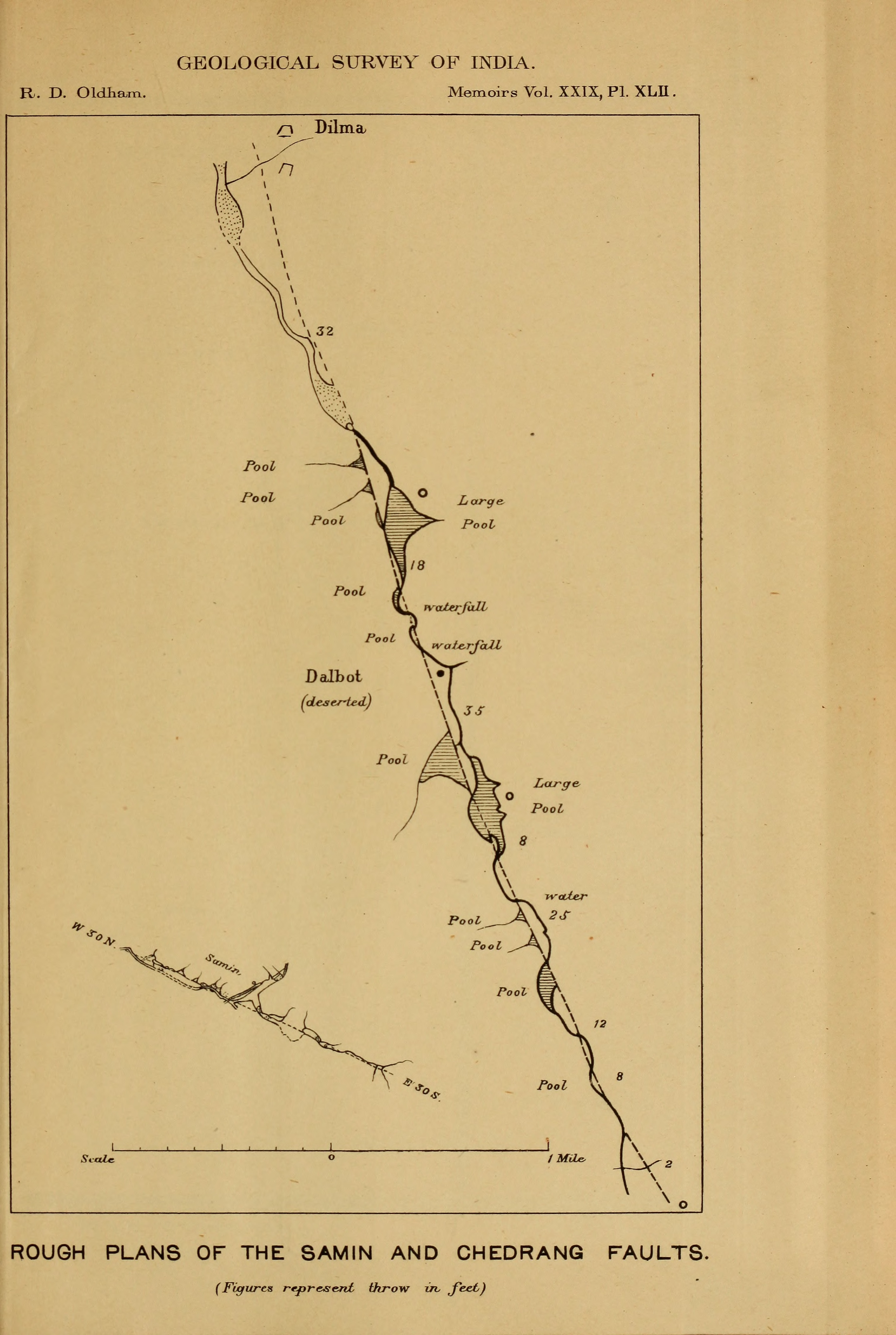
Sketch map of the Samin and Chedrang faults, showing the uplift in feet.

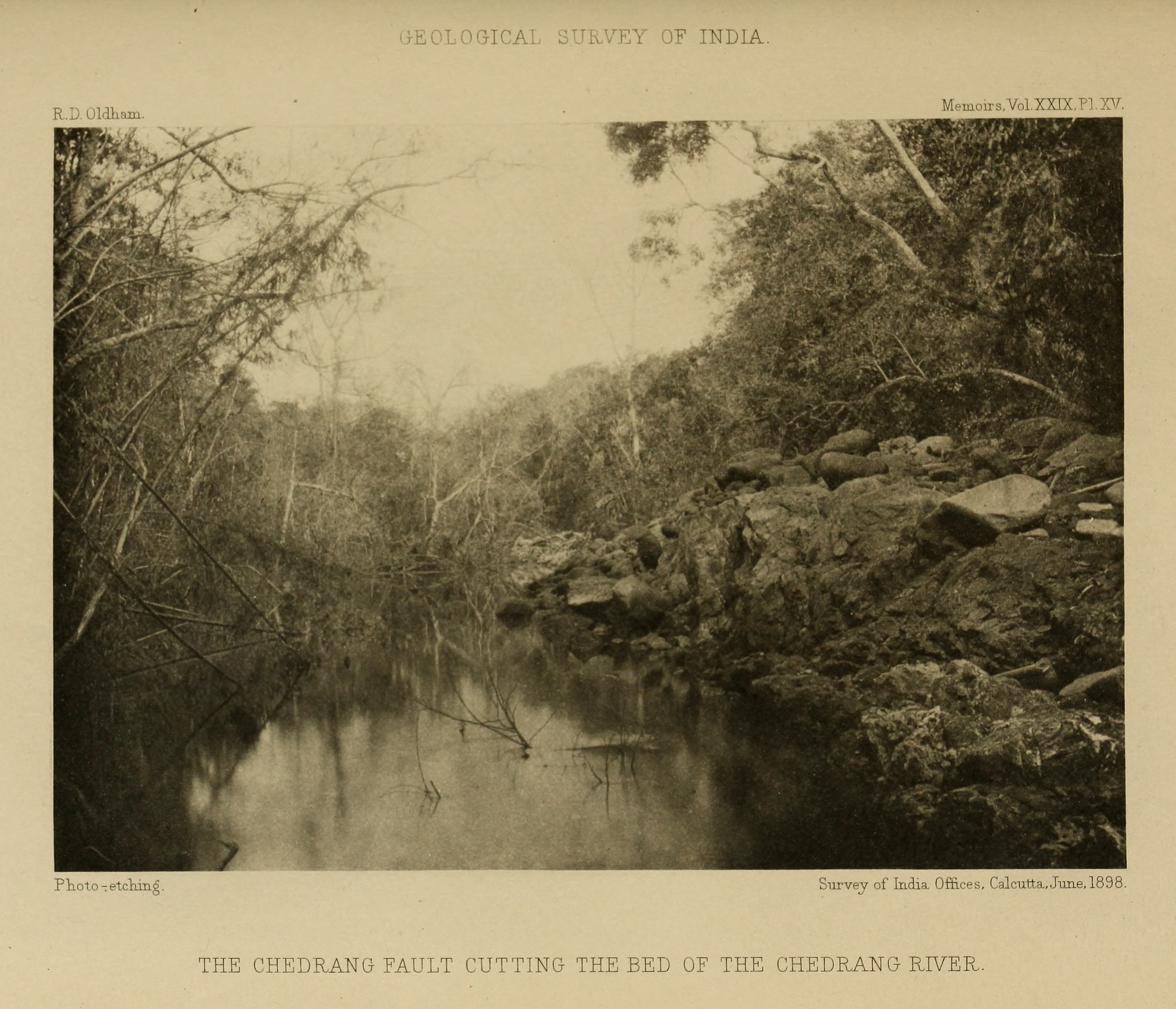
The Chedrang fault cutting the bed of the Chedrang River. The fault face forms the right bank of the current watercourse, and part of the former bed of the river can be seen above the fault face.

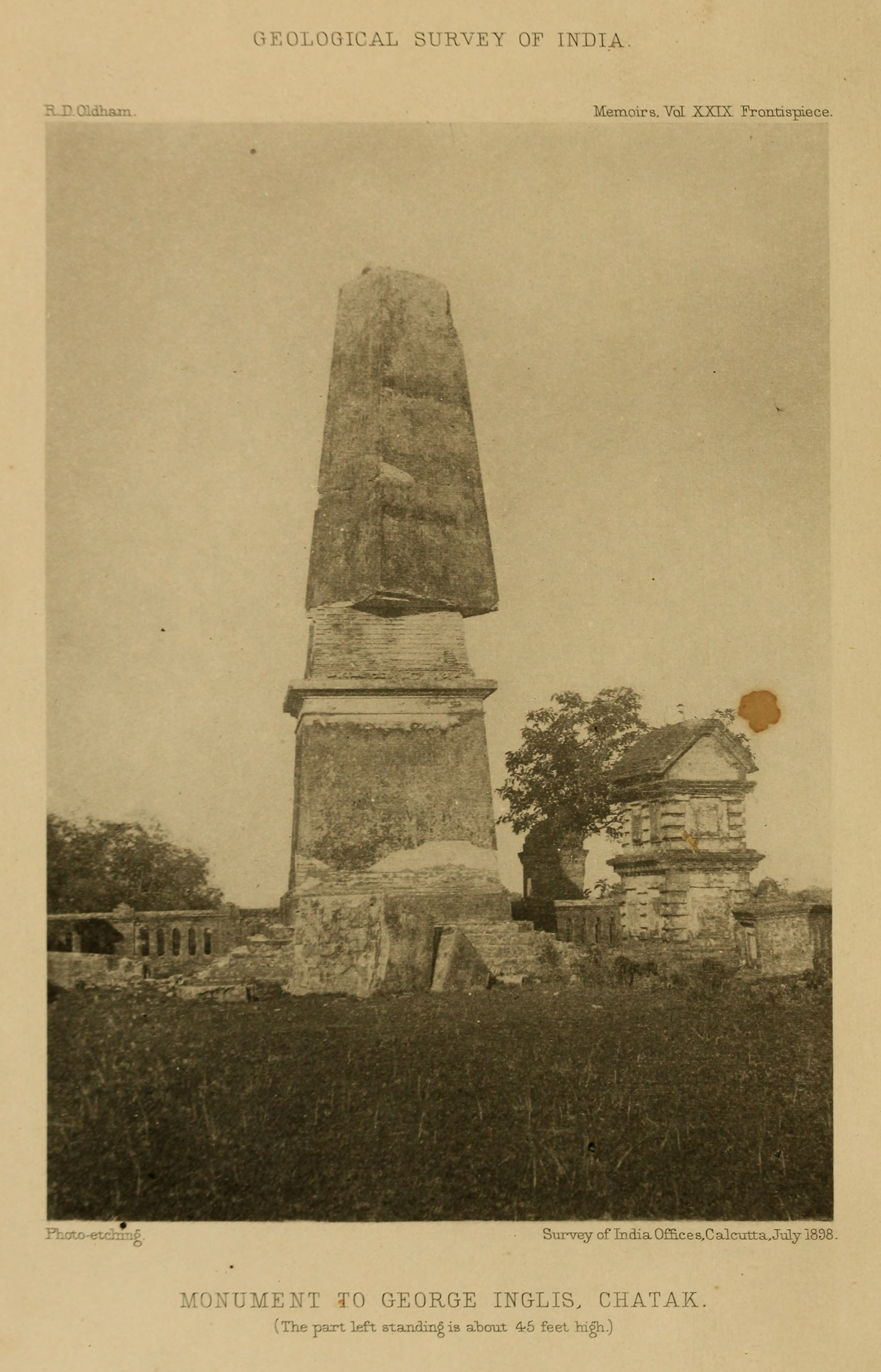
Monument to George Inglis, Chatak, showing the upper part twisted with respect to the base.

Oldham's most important contribution to seismology was the first clear identification of the separate arrivals of different groups of waves, as detected by seismograms at distant locations. In the report of the 1897 earthquake he presented data, mainly from stations in Italy, that showed three phases. The first to arrive, the P or Primary waves, were compression waves, which he referred to as condensational. Next came the S or Secondary waves, with lateral movement, which he referred to as distortional. The third phase was of large undulations. The times of arrival of these phases indicated that the first two had travelled through the body of the earth, while the third were surface waves. Since these observations agreed with theory for elastic waves, they showed that the Earth could be treated as elastic in studies of seismic waves.

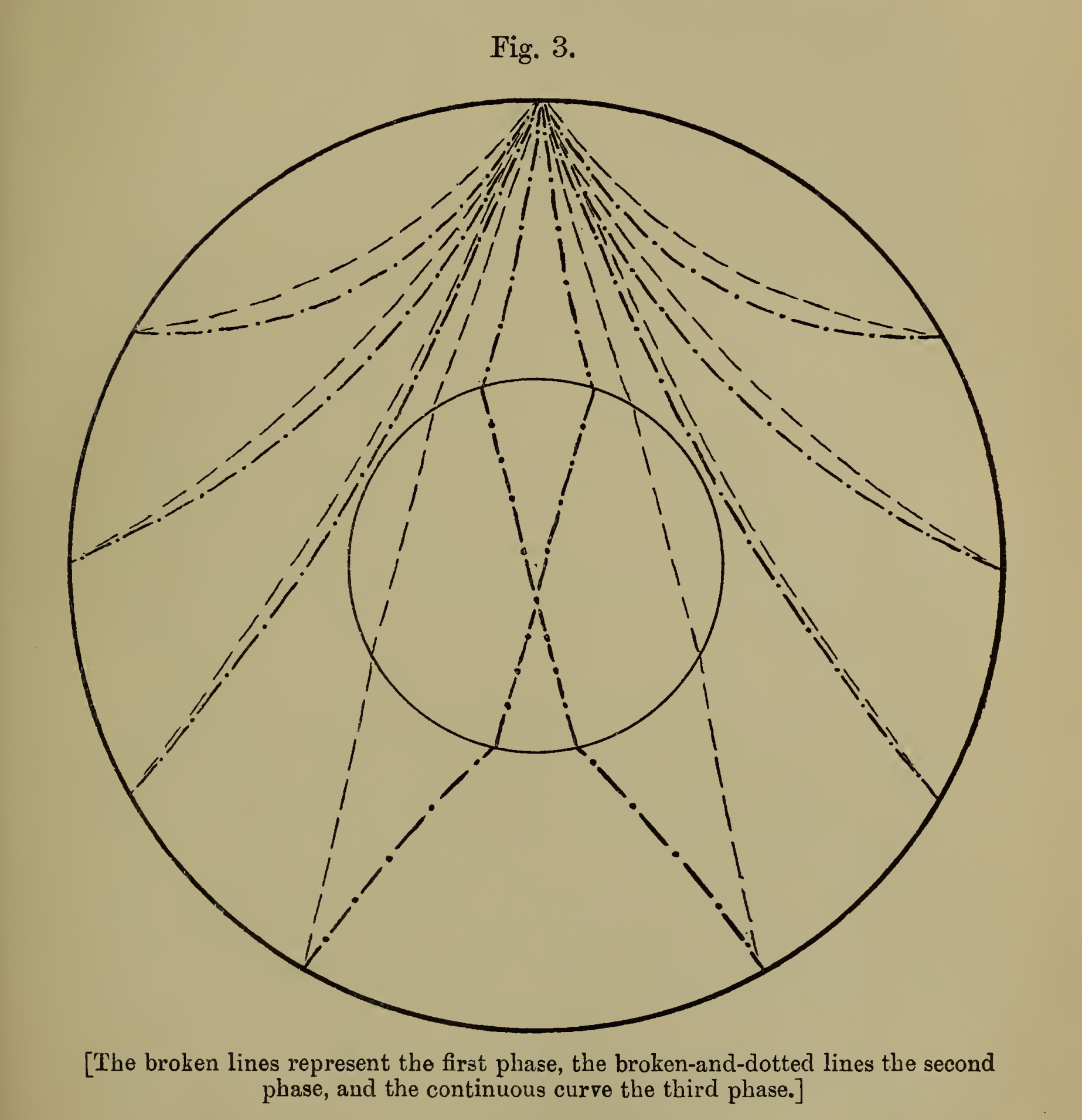
Transmission of earthquake waves, as affected by the presence of a core of 0.4 of the earth's diameter. From Oldham (1906)

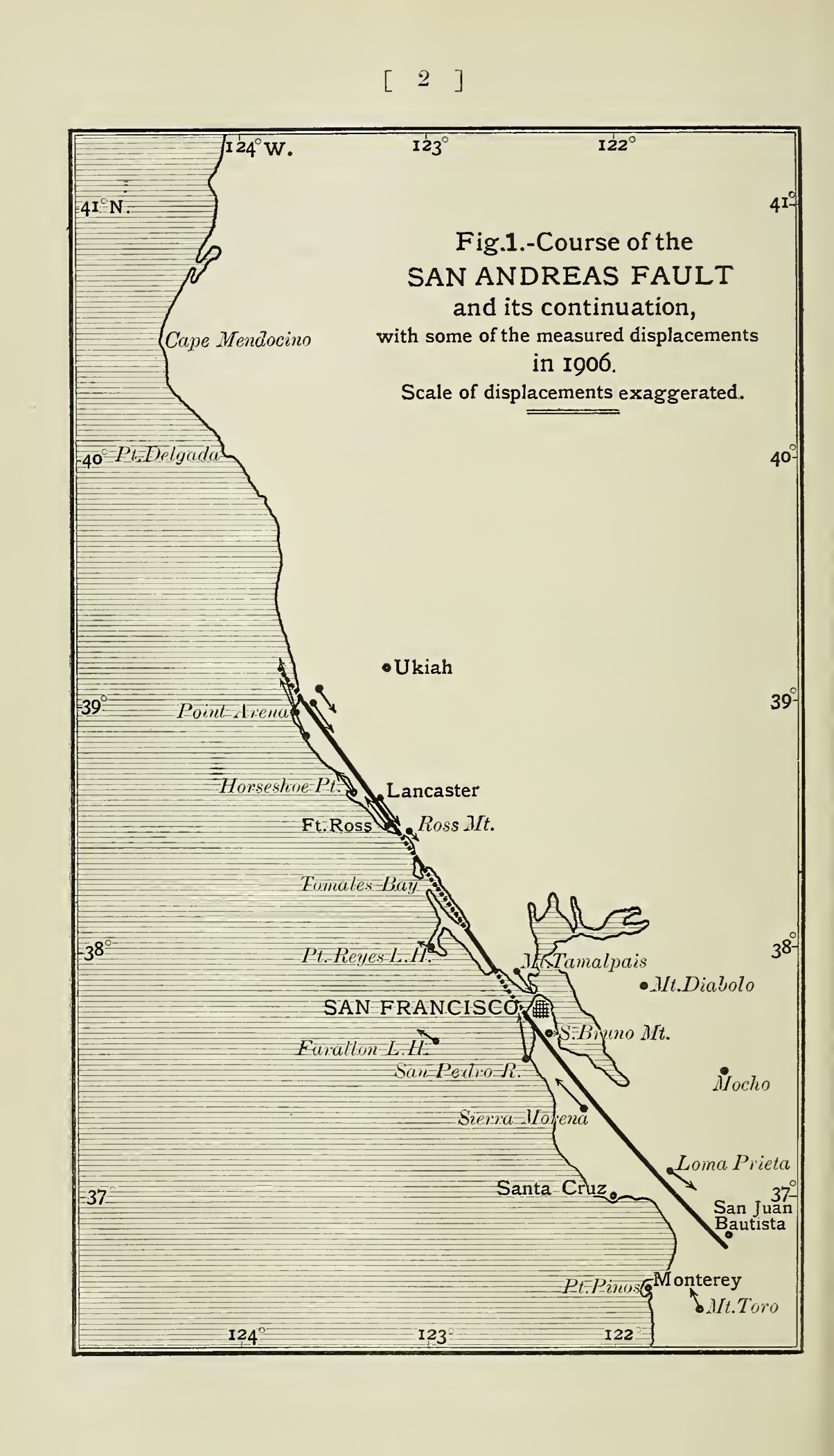
Map of the San Andreas Fault, California, showing displacements due to the 1906 Earthquake. From Oldham (1909)

In subsequent papers, Oldham compared data from numerous earthquakes, with seismic observations at different distances from the epicentre. He found a discontinuity in the travel times for the S-waves at about 120° angular distance from the earthquake, suggesting refraction by a dense core with a diameter of about 0.4 that of the earth. Oldham was not the first to suggest that the earth had a dense core, but he provided the first direct evidence of its existence and size.

In 1903, Oldham resigned from the GSI due to ill-health and returned to the United Kingdom, living in Kew and various parts of Wales. He continued to be active in the field, publishing papers on earthquakes in Guatemala and California.

In 1908 Oldham was awarded the Lyell Medal, in 1911 made a Fellow of the Royal Society, and from 1920 to 1922 served as the President of the Geological Society of London. Later in his life he became interested in the geography and history of the Rhône delta. He died on 15 July 1936.

== See also ==
- Harold Jeffreys – showed that Earth's outer core is liquid
- Inge Lehmann – showed that Earth's inner core is solid
- List of geophysicists

== Publications ==
- Oldham, R.D. (1883). "Report on the geology of parts of Manipur and the Naga Hills". Memoirs of the Geological Survey of India. 19 (4).
- —— (1886). "Essays on Speculative Geology. 1. - On Homotaxis and Contemporaneity". Geological Magazine. 3 (7): 293–300. Bibcode:1886GeoM....3..293O. doi:10.1017/S0016756800145121. S2CID 129631499.
- —— (1886). "Essays on Speculative Geology. 2 - Probable Changes of Latitude". Geological Magazine. 3 (7): 300–308. Bibcode:1886GeoM....3..300O. doi:10.1017/S0016756800145133. S2CID 128492838.
- —— (1888). A Bibliography of Indian Geology: Being a List of Books and Papers, Relating to the Geology of British India and Adjoining Countries, Published Previous to the End of AD 1887. Calcutta: Superintendent, Government Printing, India.
- —— (1894). "The Evolution of Indian Geography". The Geographical Journal. 3 (3): 169–192. doi:10.2307/1773463. JSTOR 1773463.
- —— (1899). "Report of the great earthquake of 12th June, 1897". Memoirs of the Geological Society of India. 29. K. Paul, Trench, Trübner & co.
- —— (1900). "On the Propagation of Earthquake Motion to Great Distances". Philosophical Transactions of the Royal Society A. 194 (252–261): 135–174. Bibcode:1900RSPTA.194..135O. doi:10.1098/rsta.1900.0015. JSTOR 90755.
- —— (1901). "On the Origin of the Dunmail Raise (Lake District)". Quarterly Journal of the Geological Society. 57 (1–4): 189–197. doi:10.1144/GSL.JGS.1901.057.01-04.14. S2CID 128700544.
- —— (1902). "On Tidal Periodicity in the Earthquakes of Assam". Journal of the Asiatic Society of Bengal. 71: 139–153.
- —— (1905). "The Rate of Transmission of the Guatemala Earthquake, April 19, 1902". Proceedings of the Royal Society of London. Series A. 76 (508): 102–111. Bibcode:1905RSPSA..76..102O. doi:10.1098/rspa.1905.0007.
- —— (1906). "The Constitution of the Interior of the Earth, as Revealed by Earthquakes". Quarterly Journal of the Geological Society. 62 (1–4): 456–475. doi:10.1144/GSL.JGS.1906.062.01-04.21. S2CID 129025380.
- —— (1907). "The Constitution of the Interior of the Earth, as revealed by Earthquakes:(Second Communication). Some New Light on the Origin of the Oceans". Quarterly Journal of the Geological Society. 63 (1–4): 344–350. doi:10.1144/GSL.JGS.1907.063.01-04.24. S2CID 140737052.
- —— (1909). "The Geological Interpretation of the Earth - Movements associated with the Californian Earthquake of April 18th, 1906". Quarterly Journal of the Geological Society. 65 (1–4): 1–20. doi:10.1144/GSL.JGS.1909.065.01-04.03. S2CID 129314512.
- —— (1914). "On the Effect of the Gangetic Alluvium on the Plumb-Line in Northern India". Proceedings of the Royal Society of London. Series A. 90 (615): 32–41. Bibcode:1914RSPSA..90...32O. doi:10.1098/rspa.1914.0032. JSTOR 93566.
- —— (1914). "The constitution of the interior of the Earth as revealed by earthquakes". Nature. 92 (2312): 684–685. Bibcode:1914Natur..92..684O. doi:10.1038/092684c0. S2CID 28807716.
- —— (1917). "The structure of the Himalayas and of the Gangetic plain: as elucidated by geodetic observations in India". Memoirs of the Geological Survey of India. 42 (2).
- —— (1925). "The Portolan Maps of the Rhône Delta: A Contribution to the History of the Sea Charts of the Middle Ages". The Geographical Journal. 65 (5): 403–425. doi:10.2307/1782548. JSTOR 1782548.
- —— (1926). "The Post-Roman History of the Rhone Delta". Science Progress in the Twentieth Century (1919-1933). 20 (79): 487–496. JSTOR 43428312.
- —— (1926). "The depth and twofold character of earthquake origins". The Journal of Geology. 34 (5): 385–398. Bibcode:1926JG.....34..385O. doi:10.1086/623325. S2CID 129529277.
- Oldham, Thomas (1879). Oldham, R.D. (ed.). Geological Glossary: For the Use of Students. E. Stanford.
- Oldham, Thomas (1882). Oldham, R.D. (ed.). "The Cachar earthquake of 10th January 1869". Memoirs of the Geological Survey of India. 19 (1).
- Oldham, Thomas (1882). Oldham, R.D. (ed.). "The Thermal Springs of India". Memoirs of the Geological Survey of India. 19 (2).
- Medlicott, Henry Benedict; Blanford, William Thomas; Oldham, Richard Dixon (1893). A Manual of the Geology of India: Chiefly Compiled from the Observations of the Geological Survey: Stratigraphical and Structural Geology. Calcutta: Office of the Superintendent of Government Printing.
