= Daniel Parsons =

Geologist

Daniel Roy Parsons is the Pro-Vice-Chancellor for Research and Innovation at Loughborough University and holds the Personal Title of Professor in Geosciences. He was the founding Director of the Energy and Environment Institute (2017–2022) and a professor of process sedimentology at the University of Hull from 2011 to 2022. He is also a visiting professor at the University of Illinois (USA) and Can Tho University (Vietnam). He obtained his PhD at the University of Sheffield in 2004. Parsons is known for his work on flow processes and sediment transport in rivers, coasts and estuaries, and the deep sea. This includes work addressing flood hazard and risk, as well as internationally leading work detailing turbidity currents and associated hazards in the deep sea. Parsons also researches the leakage and transport of plastics in rivers, coasts and estuaries and as part of the Huxley debate at the 2018 British Science Festival he claimed that the most significant marker for the Anthropocene age may be the fossilisation of plastic debris such as formed in plastiglomerate. Parsons is currently a member of the Natural Environment Research Council Research Committee. Parsons has recently completed a major research programme funded via a European Research Council Consolidator Award exploring the evolution of stickiness and its impact of morphodynamic and sedimentary processes. He is presently President of Division for Geomorphology of the European Geosciences Union and a Commissioner on the Yorkshire and Humber Climate Commission, chairing the Research and Evidence Panel.

== Awards ==
- 2010: Gordon Warwick Award from the British Society for Geomorphology
- 2012: Chandler-Misener Award from the International Association for Great Lakes Research
- 2015: Bigsby Medal from The Geological Society of London
- 2016: ERC Consolidator Award

== Selected publications ==
- Hackney, C. R., Vasilopoulos, G., Heng, S., Darbari, V., Walker, S., and Parsons, D.R. (2021) Sand mining far outpaces natural supply in a large alluvial river, Earth Surf. Dynam., 9, 1323–1334.
- Hope, J.A., Coco, G., Parsons, D.R. and Thrush, S.F., (2021) Microplastics interact with benthic biostabilization processes. Environmental Research Letters, 16(12), p. 124058.
- Tapoglou, E., Forster, R.M., Dorrell, R.M. and Parsons, D.R., (2021) Machine learning for satellite-based sea-state prediction in an offshore windfarm. Ocean Engineering, 235, p. 109280.
- Darby, S.E., Hackney, C.R., Leyland, J., Kummu, M., Lauri, H., Parsons, D.R., Best, J.L., Nicholas A.P., and Aalto, R. (2016) 'Fluvial Sediment Supply to a Mega-Delta Reduced by Shifting Tropical-Cyclone Activity', Nature, 539, 276–279, doi:10.1038/nature19809.
- Parsons, D.R. et al., in press, 'The Role of Bio-physical Cohesion on Subaqueous Bedform Size', Geophysical Research Letters, February, 2016.
- Malarkey, J., Baas, J.H., Hope, J.A., Aspden, R.J., Parsons, D.R., et al. (2015), 'The Pervasive Role of Biological Cohesion in Bedform Development', Nature Communications, 6, 6257.
- Reesink, A.J.H., Van den Berg, J.H., Parsons, D.R., Amsler, M.L., Best, J.L., Hardy, R.J., Orfeo, O., and Szupiany, R.N. (2015), 'Extremes in Dune Preservation: Controls on the Completeness of Fluvial Deposits', Earth-Science Reviews, 150, 652–665.
- Schindler, R.J., Parsons, D.R., et al. (2015), 'Sticky Stuff: Redefining Bedform Prediction in Modern and Ancient Environments', Geology, 43, 399–402.

A full publications listing is available here: https://scholar.google.co.uk/citations?user=qjPIPvQAAAAJ&hl=en
