= Chris Turney =

Earth and climate scientist

Christian Turney FRSA FGS FRMetS FRGS FHEA
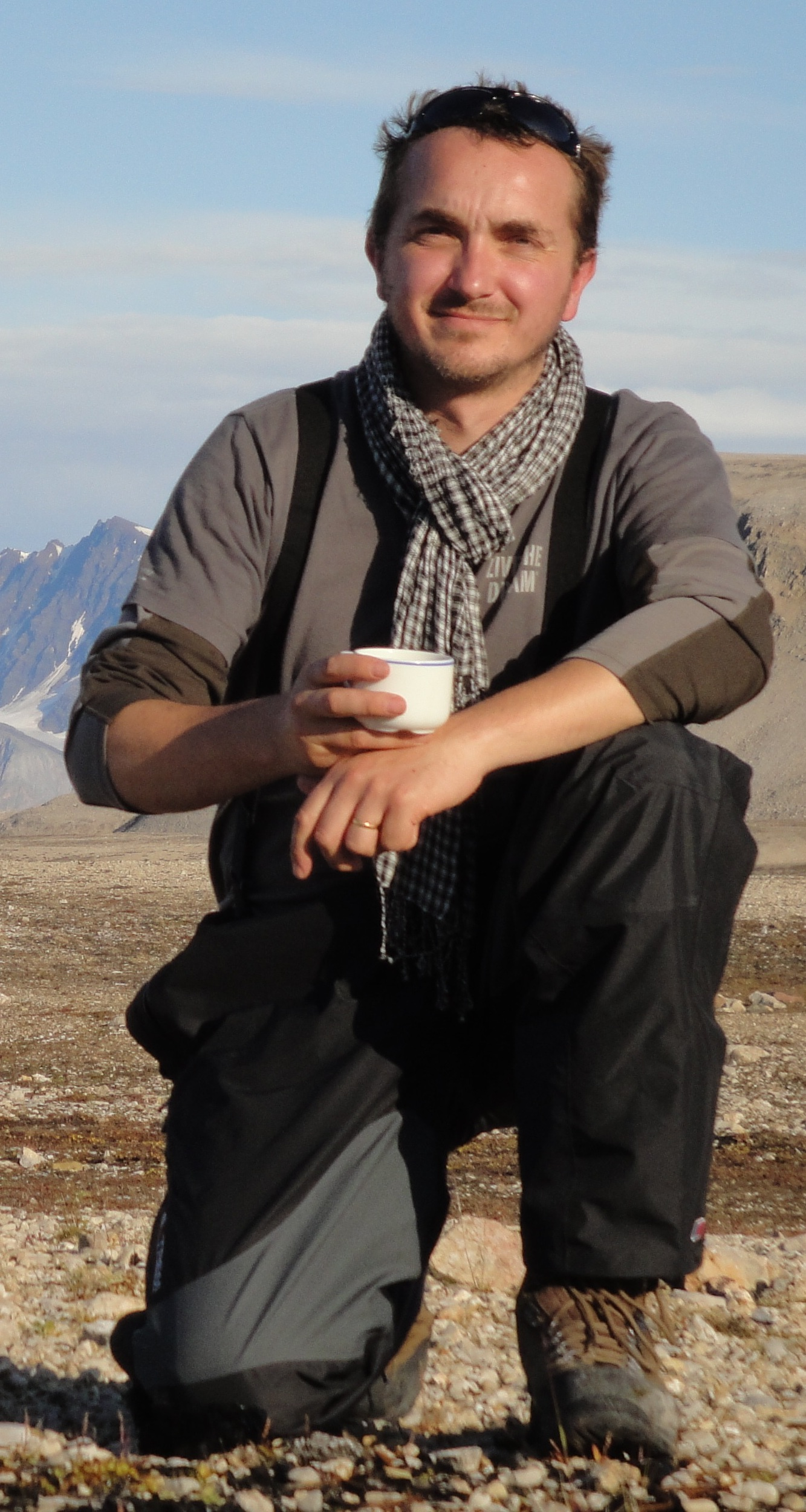
- In Svalbard May 2018
- Education: University of East Anglia; Royal Holloway, University of London
- Awards: Frederick White Prize (2014); Australian Laureate Fellowship (2010); Bigsby Medal (2009); Philip Leverhulme Prize (2008)
- Scientific career
- Fields: Sustainable Development Goals; Clean technology Climatology; Earth science
- Workplaces: Heriot-Watt University; University of Technology Sydney; University of New South Wales; University of Exeter
- Thesis: Isotope stratigraphy and tephrochronology of the last glacial-interglacial transition (14-9 KA BP) in the British isles. (1998)
- Doctoral advisor: J.J. Lowe and D.D. Harkness
- Website: new.express.adobe.com/webpage/wcF56p73fPSjV

Christian S. M. Turney is an English-born earth and climate scientist. As of 2025 he is deputy principal research and impact at Heriot-Watt University in Edinburgh, Scotland. His previous roles include pro vice-chancellor for research at the University of Technology Sydney and professor of climate change and earth science and director of the Earth and Sustainability Science Research Centre and the Chronos ^{14}Carbon-Cycle Facility at the University of New South Wales.

== Early life and education ==
Christian S. M. Turney was educated at St Bede's School in Redhill, Surrey, England.

He graduated from the University of East Anglia with a BSc in environmental science, and completed his PhD at Royal Holloway, University of London.

== Career ==
Turney was professor of physical geography at the University of Exeter.

In 2013−2014, Turney led the Australasian Antarctic Expedition, a privately-funded expedition to the Antarctic in the "Spirit of [Douglas] Mawson", to investigate environmental changes across the region and communicate the value of scientific research. Scientific findings include the recognition of a 1965 Carbon-14 peak preserved in "the Loneliest Tree in the World" and shrubs growing on Campbell Island, New Zealand, that offer a possible marker for the proposed Anthropocene Epoch in the geological timescale. On the return home Turney's ice-strengthened vessel became trapped by a substantial breakout of sea ice. After two other vessels were unable to reach the stricken ship, the expedition members were eventually airlifted by helicopter to the Chinese polar research vessel Xue Long, while the Russian crew members had to stay on board the ship. Environmental writer Andrew Revkin criticised the scientists on board Akademik Shokalskiy; however, Professor Michael Robinson of University of Hartford noted that the expedition aimed to use Mawson's observations as a baseline for their own scientific findings "that [would] illuminate Antarctica's future, not its past. As such, the voyage [would] prove to be well worth the time and effort". Turney's book on the expedition's discoveries and the team's experiences trapped by sea ice was published under two titles: Iced In: Ten Days Trapped on the Edge of Antarctica in Australia and New Zealand, and also as Shackled, by Penguin.

Turney was a professor at the University of New South Wales in 2013. He was later professor of climate change and earth science and director of the Earth and Sustainability Science Research Centre and the Chronos ^{14}Carbon-Cycle Facility at the University of New South Wales.

In November 2021, University of Technology Sydney announced that Turney was joining their university in January 2022 as their new pro-vice-chancellor for research.

On 23 April 2025, Turney was announced as deputy principal research and impact at Heriot-Watt University in Edinburgh, Scotland. In the role, he leads the development and growth of Heriot-Watt's Global Research Institutes and continue the advancement of the Research Futures Hub.

== Other activities and roles ==
Turney was a founding director and later scientific advisor to New Zealand cleantech company CarbonScape, which has developed patented technology to produce and engineer carbon-negative graphite from sustainably-sourced biomass to be used in lithium-ion batteries.

As of April 2021 Turney was a non-executive director to Cicada, an Australian incubator for startups and scaleups working on deeptech innovations. He was also a non-executive director to the New South Wales Environment Protection Authority.

== Publications ==
Turney has published hundreds of research papers, in addition to at least one textbook and four books, attracting more than 40,000 citations as of March 2023.

He has an h-index of 69 on Google Scholar (60 on Scopus). This output put Turney on the 2018 Clarivate Highly Cited Researcher list, representing the 1% most cited scientists in the world.

== Recognition and awards ==
- 2004: J. G. Russell Award, Australian Academy of Science
- 2007: Inaugural Sir Nicholas Shackleton Medal, International Union for Quaternary Research
- 2008: Philip Leverhulme Prize
- 2009: Bigsby Medal, Geological Society of London
- 2010: Australian Laureate Fellowship, to investigate tipping points in the Earth system
- 2014: Frederick White Prize, Australian Academy of Science, for contributions to understanding natural phenomena that impact human lives
