= Janet Watson =

British geologist

- Born: Janet Vida Watson; 1 September 1923; Hampstead, London, UK
- Died: 29 March 1985 (aged 61); Ashtead, UK
- Education: Reading University (1943); Imperial College (PhD, 1949)
- Occupation: Professor at Imperial College London (1958).
- Spouse: John Sutton (m. 1949–1985)
- Children: 2 daughters (both died at birth)
- Parents: David Meredith Seares Watson (palaeontologist) (father); Katherine Margarite Watson (mother)

Janet Vida Watson FRS FGS (1923–1985) was a British geologist. She was a professor of Geology at Imperial College, a rapporteur for the International Geological Correlation Program (IGCP) (1977–1982) and a vice president of the Royal Society (1983–1984). In 1982 she was elected president of the Geological Society of London, the first woman to occupy that position. She is well known for her contribution to the understanding of the Lewisian complex and as an author and co-author of several books including Beginning Geology and Introduction to Geology.

== Personal life ==
She was born 1 September 1923 in Hampstead, London. Her father; David M. S. Watson FRS was a vertebrate palaeontologist and a zoology and comparative anatomy professor at the University of London. Her mother; Katharine M. Parker, did research in embryology prior to marriage. Janet Watson grew up alongside her sister, Katharine Mary in South Hampstead where she attended South Hampstead High School, which was known for being specialised in teaching science. She then went on to attend Reading University in 1943 to learn about General Science. Watson graduated with a first class honours degree in biology and geology in 1943. After a convincing recommendation from Professor H.L Hawkins and a first class General Honours degree, Watson attended Imperial College. She graduated in 1947 with a first class honours in Geology. Watson married John Sutton in 1949 and they had a professional partnership throughout their lives. They had two daughters who both had died at birth. Watson died on 29 March 1985, at the age of 61.

== Career ==
After her graduation in 1943, Watson began working at the National Institute for Research in Dairying. She observed chicken growth and their diets. She became bored with her job and went on to teach biology at Wentworth School, Bournemouth before deciding to become a geologist by the end of World War II. She applied to Imperial College in 1945, completing her B.Sc. in geology in 1947, again getting a first class degree. Prior to graduating, Janet's interest in geology was spurred after working on a mapping project in the Scottish Highlands in 1946. Watson enrolled for her PhD in 1947 and began studying the Lewisian Complex in northern Scotland. After her second graduation, the then head of department, Herbert Harold Read, took her on as his student and set her to work on the migmatites of Sutherland. She then began to work on the Lewisian complex of northwestern Scotland together with John Sutton, another of Read's research students. The two completed their Ph.D theses in 1949 followed by a wedding and honeymoon in the Channel Islands, which explains a joint publication on the geology of Sark a few years later.

After receiving her PhD in 1949, Janet and her husband; John Sutton, continued their involvement with Imperial College. They published their thesis work in a paper in 1951, that had a major impact on the study of Precambrian basement complexes, by showing that it was possible to understand their metamorphic and structural development as a series of discrete orogenic events that could be discerned in the field. They proposed that an older Archaean Scourian complex, had been partially reworked by a younger Paleoproterozoic Laxfordian orogenic event, as shown by its effect on a set of dolerite dykes, known as the Scourie dykes. Subsequent fieldwork, metamorphic studies and radiometric dating has refined their chronology but supported their original hypothesis.

In 1952, Janet worked under H.H. Read as a research assistant, until 1973 when she became a senior lecturer. They continued to work together on other aspects of the Precambrian geology of Scotland, including the Moine, Dalradian and Torridonian. John Sutton became head of department at Imperial College in 1964 and from then on their joint publications became less frequent. Watson published an introductory textbook Beginning geology with her former Ph.D supervisor H.H. Read in 1966, followed by Introduction to Geology: Volume 1 Principles in 1968 and Introduction to geology Volume2 Earth history: Part 1 Early Stages of Earth History and Part 2 Later Stages of Earth History in 1975.

Around the 1960s, Janet and her research team collaborated with survey geologists from the Highlands Unit of the Institute of Geological Sciences (IGS) to study the Outer Hebrides in Scotland. Later on, they published maps of the region in 1982 as well as a memoir in 1994.

In 1965 isotopic dating had advanced into practicality for geologists. This technology aided Janet's research in the Caledonian Belt, showing metamorphic rocks, migmatites, and granites ages ranging from 750 to 360 million years old. Another set of discoveries in south-west England show metamorphic rocks ranging from 400 to 350 million years old, hercynian granites 300 to 250 million years old, tertiary granites and allied rocks 65 to 50 million years old.

From the mid-1970s Jane worked with the IGS to study the post-Caledonian evolution of Scotland and the effects that diagenesis and hydrothermal activity had on the region.

In 1975, Watson was appointed to a personal chair as research professor of geology. She continued to work on the problems of the precambrian in Scotland but also published on ore genesis and regional geochemistry. From 1977, Jane worked with the IGS again to study the structural evolution of northern Scotland and its effects on uranium distribution throughout the region. From this study, they developed "stream sediment sampling" which was a technique used to study geochemical problems. She served as president of the Geological Society from 1982 to 1984, the first woman to hold that post. During her time in this role, the Geological Society received additional funding for the Palaeographic Atlas. Watson continued to work in her profession during her retirement, in spite of ailing health, until her death in 1985.

Throughout her career, Janet continued her research in certain regions of the world, including: Greenland, the Channel Islands, Italy and Tanganyika. From this work she also published around 65 research papers.

== Awards ==
- Lyell Fund – awarded jointly with John Sutton 1954
- Bigsby Medal – awarded jointly with John Sutton 1965
- Lyell Medal – awarded 1973
- Clough Medal – awarded 1979
- Fellow of the Royal Society – elected 1979, member of the council and vice-president until her death

== Publications ==
Year	Publication	Subject Matter
1962	Fossils and their Uses	What is a fossil and what they are used for
1966	Beginning Geology	Early stages of the earth's history
1975	A Correlation of the Precambrian Rocks in the British Isles	The Geology of Great Britain
1977	Introduction to Geology	Introducing geology (rocks and mineralogy)
1979	Rocks and Minerals - Second Edition	Isotopic age-determinations of rocks and minerals
1983	Geology and Man: An Introduction to Applied Earth Science	Introduction to earth science and environmental science

== Legacy ==
Janet Watson was a major contributor to the advancement of Earth Science. In May 2009, the lecture theatre at the Geological Society was named after her as an appreciation for her major influence in the geology community. As of 2016, the Geological Society holds an annual Janet Watson meeting event. The conference puts an emphasis on giving the opportunity to young geologists starting their careers to present and discuss their research. Watson is also very well remembered for her ability to ask fundamental questions about many areas in her field. One of her many students, Rick Sibson, appreciated her for always pushing them to create their own way of thinking.
