= Michael Christopher Daly =

British geologist and executive (born 1953)

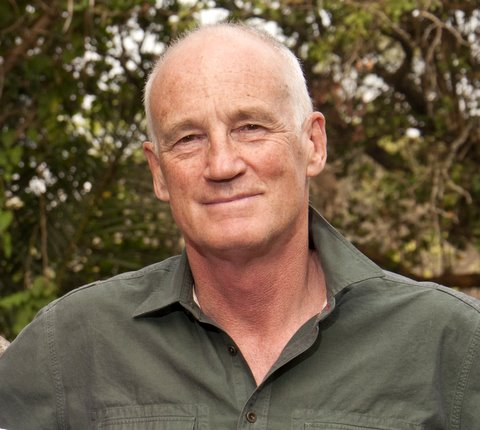
- Michael Daly in Zambia in 2013.
- Born: 1953 (age 72–73)
- Occupation: Geologist
- Years active: 1976 - present
- Employer: British Petroleum
- Known for: Petroleum exploration & tectonics

Michael Christopher Daly (Mike), (born 1953), is a British geologist, oil and gas executive and academic. BP’s global exploration chief for eight years, he retired in 2014 and became a visiting professor in Earth Sciences at the University of Oxford where he works on continental tectonics and resources.

== Career ==
Daly joined the Geological Survey of Zambia in 1976, mapping the remote Muchinga Mountains of northeast Zambia and publishing on the Precambrian Irumide Belt, Rift Valley formation and the evolution of the Congo Basin. He began his business career with BP in 1986 and after a period of strategy work and time in Venezuela, the North Sea and London, he became President of BP's activities in the Middle East. In 2006 Daly became BP's global exploration chief, achieving a series of giant oil and gas discoveries and BP's return to Iraq and the Rumaila oil field, and entry into Oman and the Kazzan giant gas field.

During BP's recovery from the Deepwater Horizon incident Daly served on BP's Group Executive Team. He retired in 2014 after 28 years with the company.

In 2013 Daly was appointed Visiting Professor in Earth Sciences at The University of Oxford. He is also a non-executive director with Tullow Oil, and CGG, and a partner at Macro Advisory Partners. He is a recipient of the Geological Society of London’s Petroleum Medal.

== Personal life ==
Born in Yorkshire, Daly is the son of Irish rugby player John Daly. He is an amateur yachtsman, outdoorsman and traveller. He is a graduate of University College of Wales (BSc) and Leeds University (PhD), in African tectonics. Daly is an alumnus of Harvard Business School's Program for Management Development.

== Publications ==
- Daly, M. C., et al. 2018. Cratonic Basin Formation: A Case Study of the Parnaíba Basin of Brazil. Geological Society, London, Special Publication, 472. https://doi.org/10.1144/SP472.20
- Mckenzie, D, Daly, M.C. & Priestley, K. 2015. The Lithospheric structure of Pangea. Geology, https://doi.org/10.1130/G36819.1
- Daly, M. C. et al. 2014. Brasiliano crustal structure and the tectonic setting of the Parnaíba basin of NE Brazil. https://doi.org/10.1002/2014TC003632
- Daly, M.C., 2007. Evolution of the Mesoproterozoic Irumide Belt of Zambia. Geol. Soc. Lond. Spec. Pub. 272.
- Daly, M.C. et al. 1996. Remaining Resource of the UKCS North Sea. In K. Glennie & A. Hurst (eds), 1995: NW Europe's Hydrocarbon Industry. Geol. Soc. Lond.
- Daly, M.C. et al. 1992. Tectonic Evolution of the Cuvette Centrale, Zaire. J. Geol. Soc. Lond. 149.
- Daly, M. C. et al. 1989. Rift basin evolution in Africa: the influence of steep reactivated shear zones. Geol. Soc. Lond. Spec. Pub. 44.
- Daly, M.C. 1986. Crustal shear zones and thrust belts: Their geometry and continuity in Central Africa. Phil. Trans. Roy. Soc. Lond. A 317.
