= Jon Blundy =

British petrologist

- Born: Jonathan David Blundy; 7 August 1961 (age 65)
- Education: University of Oxford (BA); University of Cambridge (PhD)
- Awards: Murchison Medal (2016); FRS (2008); Bigsby Medal (2005)
- Scientific career
- Fields: Petrology
- Workplaces: University of Bristol; MIT
- Thesis: The geology of the Southern Adamello Massif, Italy (1989)
- Academic advisors: Robert Stephen John Sparks

Jonathan David Blundy FRS (born 7 August 1961) is Royal Society Research Professor at the School of Earth Sciences at the University of Oxford and honorary professor at the University of Bristol.

== Education ==
He is a graduate of University College, Oxford (B.A., 1983) and Trinity Hall, Cambridge, (PhD, 1989) and a former Kennedy Scholar at the Massachusetts Institute of Technology (1985). He was educated at St Paul's School, Brazil, Giggleswick School and Leeds Grammar School, where petrologists Keith Cox and Lawrence Wager also studied.

== Career ==
Blundy is most noted for advancing the understanding of how magmas are generated in the Earth's crust and mantle and of the processes that occur in volcanoes before they erupt. He undertook his PhD research at the University of Cambridge under the supervision of Professor Robert Stephen John Sparks on the granites of Adamello-Presanella in the Italian Alps. In a series of papers with the notable Bernard Wood in the 1990s, Blundy popularized a theory of elastic strain originally developed by Onuma to describe the uptake of trace elements into the crystal lattices of igneous minerals. The theory was based on high temperature and pressure experiments on molten rocks, and is now widely used to predict crystal-melt partition coefficients for use in modelling magmatic processes.

Blundy subsequently collaborated with Katharine Cashman at the University of Oregon on Mount St. Helens volcano in the Cascade Range of northwestern USA. Blundy and Cashman demonstrated the importance of degassing in driving the crystallisation of volatile-bearing magmas, a process that can occur without any attendant cooling. In fact, because of the release of latent heat of fusion, magmas that crystallise by decompression can actually get hotter in the process.

== Awards and honours ==
Blundy is a recipient of the F.W. Clarke Medal of the Geochemical Society (1997), and Murchison Fund (1998) and the Bigsby Medal of the Geological Society of London (2005). He was a Fulbright Scholar at University of Oregon in 1998, guest professor at Nagoya University in 2007 and elected as a Fellow of the Royal Society (FRS) in 2008. His nomination reads:

Jon Blundy has made fundamental contributions to understanding the generation and movement of magma within the earth. The breadth of his work is impressive, ranging from field studies of the emplacement mechanisms of granites and volcanic rocks, through experimental petrology and thermodynamics applied to igneous systems, to study of the oxidation state of the mantle. His most recent programme has combined a wide range of field, analytical, and laboratory skills to quantifying the pressure-temperature paths followed by magmas as they ascend beneath volcanoes, and has cast important new light on the evolution of magmas immediately before major eruptions.

Blundy was also awarded the Royal Society Wolfson Research Merit Award in 2011.
