= George William Lamplugh =

British geologist

George William Lamplugh (8 April 1859 – 9 October 1926) was a British geologist. He was elected a Fellow of the Royal Society in 1905 and won the Wollaston Medal of the Geological Society in 1925. He was awarded the Bigsby Medal in 1901.

== Lamplugh and the Isle of Man ==
Between 1892 and 1897, Lamplugh made the first official geological map of the Isle of Man under the auspices of the British Geological Survey. His original observations and field maps are kept at the British Geological Survey in Edinburgh. Hand-painted 'clean' copies of his map sheets are housed at the Manx Museum on the Isle of Man.
