= Caroline Lear =

Researcher

- Education: University of Cambridge (PhD); University of Oxford (BSc)
- Awards: Geological Society of London; Bigsby Medal
- Scientific career
- Workplaces: Rutgers University; Cardiff University

Caroline "Carrie" Helen Lear is a Professor of Earth Science and the Head of the Changing Earth and Oceans Research Group at Cardiff University. She was awarded 2017 the Geological Society of London Bigsby Medal. She is the founding chair of the Changing Earth and Oceans Research Group and an editor of the journal Geology.

== Early life and education ==
Lear studied earth sciences at the University of Oxford and graduated in 1997. She was awarded the Geology Prize and Scholarship. In 1997 she moved to the University of Cambridge, where she earned her doctorate and was supported by a Bateman Scholarship. Lear was a postdoctoral research associate at the Institute of Marine and Coastal Sciences, Rutgers University until 2004.

== Research ==
Lear joined Cardiff University as a lecturer in earth sciences in 2004. She was awarded the Philip Leverhulme Prize in 2005. She was made a Chair of Earth Sciences, School of Earth and Ocean Sciences at Cardiff in 2016. Her research involves the use of geochemistry of carbonate fossils to understand climate change, in an effort to understand how ice sheets respond to changing levels in carbon dioxide. The fossils studied by Lear are collected from deep sea sediment during the International Ocean Discovery Program. Lear combines oxygen isotope analysis with investigations into the amount of magnesium that takes place of the calcium in microfossils. Oxygen isotope analysis cannot properly separate temperature and global ice volume, whereas magnesium levels are only impacted by temperature. She discussed her research with Melvyn Bragg on In Our Time in 2013.

In 2016 Lear investigated the reasons that ice ages now take place every 100,000 years, rather than on the 40,000 intervals that they occurred on previously. By monitoring the chemical composition of microfossils, Lear identified that there was more carbon dioxide stored in the deep oceans during the ice ages at 100,000 year intervals. These findings imply that during these times extra carbon dioxide is being pulled into the oceans from the Earth's atmosphere, which lowers the temperature on Earth and results in ice sheets engulfing the Northern Hemisphere. She showed that volcanic eruptions of the Columbia River Basalt Group releases carbon dioxide into the atmosphere, triggering a decline in ocean pH and increasing global temperatures. The associated sea level rise buried large numbers of marine organisms in sediment, transferring volcanic carbon to the ocean over thousands of years. She has also studied how levels of atmospheric carbon dioxide impact ocean acidification.

Lear was awarded the Geological Society of London Bigsby Medal in 2017. She is a member of the Cardiff University Women in Science group. She has taken part in Soapbox Science.

=== Selected publications ===
- Lear, Caroline Helen (2000). "Cenozoic deep-sea temperatures and global ice volumes from Mg/Ca in benthic foraminiferal calcite". Science. 287 (5451): 269–272. Bibcode:2000Sci...287..269L. doi:10.1126/science.287.5451.269. PMID 10634774.
- Lear, Caroline Helen (2002-10-01). "Benthic foraminiferal Mg/Ca-paleothermometry: A revised core-top calibration". Geochimica et Cosmochimica Acta. 66 (19): 3375–3387. Bibcode:2002GeCoA..66.3375L. doi:10.1016/S0016-7037(02)00941-9.
- Lear, Caroline Helen (2008-03-01). "Cooling and ice growth across the Eocene-Oligocene transition". Geology. 36 (3): 251–254. Bibcode:2008Geo....36..251L. doi:10.1130/G24584A.1.
