= Wallace Spencer Pitcher =

British geologist

Wallace (Wally) Spencer Pitcher FGS (3 March 1919 – 4 September 2004) was a British geologist.

== Career ==
Pitcher was born in London and became interested in fossils in childhood. At 17 he started work as an assistant assayer, attending college part-time to study for a degree in Chemistry and Geology at Chelsea College, London, graduating after war service in 1947.

Professor Herbert Harold Read of Imperial College offered him a post as a Demonstrator with the opportunity to study granite rocks in Donegal, and Pitcher, with his wife Stella Scutt, started in 1948 a 25-year programme of rock mapping in Donegal. He was promoted to Assistant Lecturer (1948) and then to Lecturer (1950–1955). He developed new procedures based on colorimetry and flame-photometry which speeded up the rock analyses. In 1972 he published The Geology of Donegal: A Study of Granite Emplacement and Unroofing.

In 1955 he moved to King's College London as Reader in Geology and then in 1962 to the George Herdman Chair of Geology at the University of Liverpool where he remained until retirement in 1981. Whilst at Liverpool he led a multi-year research project on the granite rocks in the Peruvian Andes.

He held the post of Secretary (1970–1973), Foreign Secretary (1974–1975) and then President (1977–1978) of the Geological Society, and awarded the Murchison Medal in 1979. He was a founder member of the Institution of Geologists and their Aberconway Medallist in 1983. He wrote another book, The Nature of and Origin of Granite (1993); second edition (1997).
