= Discovery of graphene =

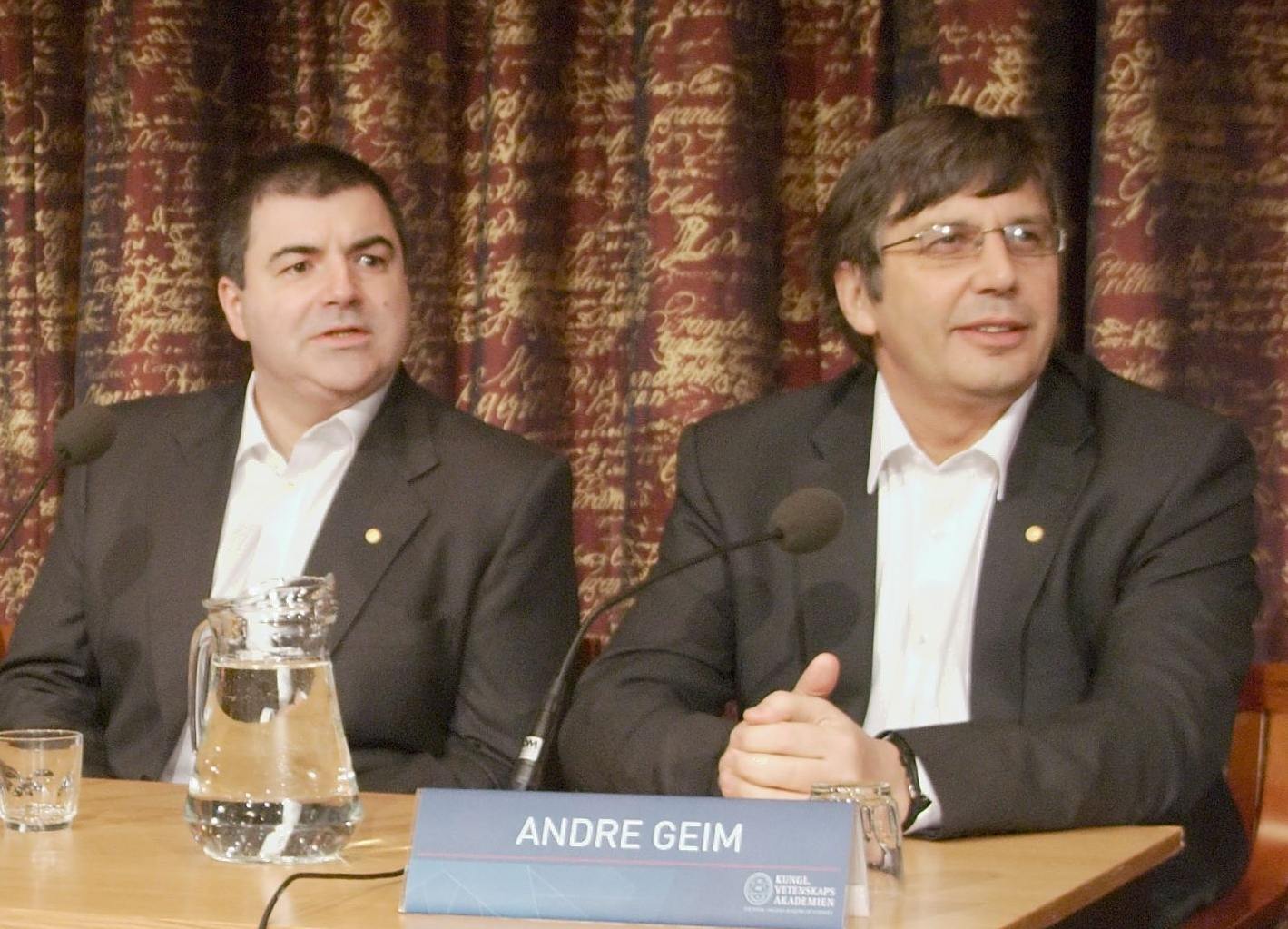
Konstantin Novoselov (left) and Andre Geim (right) at a 2010 Nobel Prize press conference

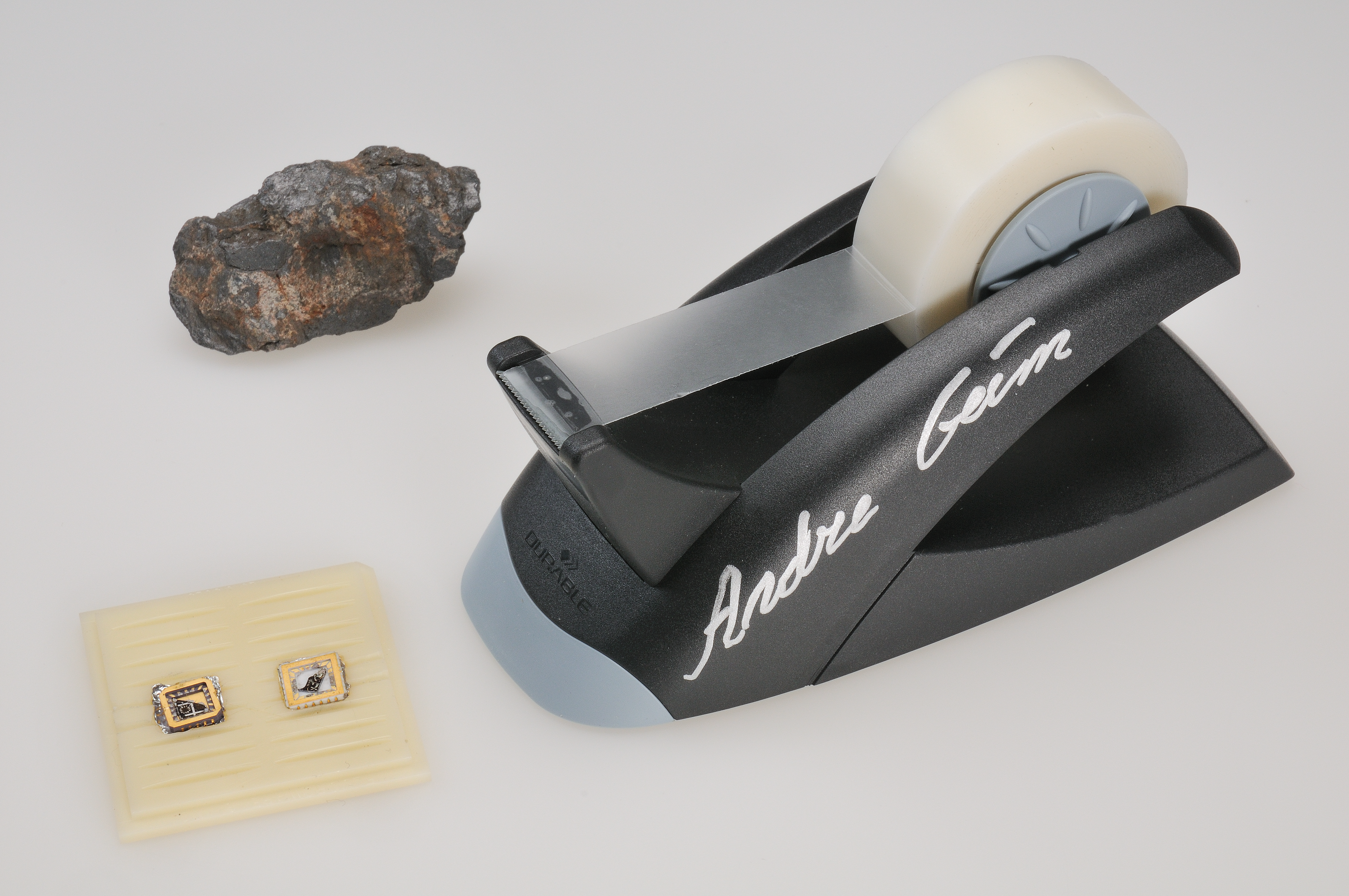
A lump of graphite, a graphene transistor, and a tape dispenser, a tool that was used for the exfolitation of single-layer graphene from graphite in 2004. Donated to the Nobel Museum in Stockholm by Andre Geim and Konstantin Novoselov in 2010.

Single-layer graphene was first unambiguously produced and identified in 2004, by the group of Andre Geim and Konstantin Novoselov, though they credit Hanns-Peter Boehm and his co-workers for the experimental discovery of graphene in 1962; while it had been explored theoretically by P. R. Wallace in 1947. Hanns-Peter Boehm, Ralph Setton and Eberhard Stumpp. introduced the term graphene in 1986.

== Early history ==
In 1859, Benjamin Collins Brodie became aware of the highly lamellar structure of thermally reduced graphite oxide.

The structure of graphite was identified in 1916 by the related method of powder diffraction. It was studied in detail by Kohlschütter and Haenni in 1918, who described the properties of graphite oxide paper. Its structure was determined from single-crystal diffraction in 1924.

The theory of graphene was first explored by P. R. Wallace in 1947 as a starting point for understanding the electronic properties of 3D graphite. The emergent massless Dirac equation was first pointed out by Gordon W. Semenoff, David DiVincenzo and Eugene J. Mele. Semenoff emphasized the occurrence in a magnetic field of an electronic Landau level precisely at the Dirac point. This level is responsible for the anomalous integer quantum Hall effect.

The earliest TEM images of few-layer graphite were published by G. Ruess and F. Vogt in 1948. Later, single graphene layers were observed directly by electron microscopy. Before 2004 intercalated graphite compounds were studied under a transmission electron microscope (TEM). Researchers occasionally observed thin graphitic flakes ("few-layer graphene") and possibly even individual layers. An early, detailed study on few-layer graphite dates to 1962 when Boehm reported producing monolayer flakes of reduced graphene oxide. (Note: This paper reports graphitic flakes that give an additional contrast equivalent of down to ≈0.4 nm or 3 atomic layers of amorphous carbon. This was the best possible resolution for 1960 TEMs. However, neither then nor today it is possible to argue how many layers were in those flakes. Now we know that the TEM contrast of graphene most strongly depends on focusing conditions. For example, it is impossible to distinguish between suspended monolayer and multilayer graphene by their TEM contrasts, and the only known way is to analyse relative intensities of various diffraction spots.)

Starting in the 1970s single layers of graphite were grown epitaxially on top of other materials. This "epitaxial graphene" consists of a single-atom-thick hexagonal lattice of sp^{2}-bonded carbon atoms, as in free-standing graphene. However, significant charge transfers from the substrate to the epitaxial graphene, and in some cases, the d-orbitals of the substrate atoms hybridize with the π orbitals of graphene, which significantly alters the electronic structure of epitaxial graphene.

Single layers of graphite were observed by TEM within bulk materials, in particular inside soot obtained by chemical exfoliation. Efforts to make thin films of graphite by mechanical exfoliation started in 1990, but nothing thinner than 50 to 100 layers was produced before 2004.

== Naming ==
The term graphene was introduced in 1986 by chemists Hanns-Peter Boehm, Ralph Setton and Eberhard Stumpp. It is a combination of the word graphite and the suffix -ene, referring to polycyclic aromatic hydrocarbons.

== Discovery ==
Initial attempts to make atomically thin graphitic films employed exfoliation techniques similar to the drawing method. Multilayer samples down to 10 nm in thickness were obtained. Earlier researchers tried to isolate graphene starting with intercalated compounds, producing very thin graphitic fragments (possibly monolayers). Neither of the earlier observations was sufficient to launch the "graphene gold rush" that awaited macroscopic samples of extracted atomic planes.

One of the first patents pertaining to the production of graphene was filed in October 2002 and granted in 2006. It detailed one of the first large scale graphene production processes. Two years later, in 2004 Geim and Novoselov extracted single-atom-thick crystallites from bulk graphite. They pulled graphene layers from graphite and transferred them onto thin silicon dioxide (SiO_{2}) on a silicon wafer in a process called either micromechanical cleavage or the Scotch tape technique. The SiO_{2} electrically isolated the graphene and weakly interacted with it, providing nearly charge-neutral graphene layers. The silicon beneath the SiO_{2} could be used as a "back gate" electrode to vary the charge density in the graphene over a wide range. US patent 6667100, filed in 2002, describes how to process expanded graphite to achieve a graphite thickness of one hundred-thousandth of an inch (0.25 nm). The key to success was high-throughput visual recognition of graphene on a properly chosen substrate that provides a small but noticeable optical contrast.

The cleavage technique led directly to the first observation of the anomalous quantum Hall effect in graphene, which provided direct evidence of graphene's theoretically predicted Berry's phase of massless Dirac fermions. The effect was reported by Geim's group and by Philip Kim and Yuanbo Zhang, whose papers appeared in Nature in 2005. Before these experiments other researchers had looked for the quantum Hall effect and Dirac fermions in bulk graphite.

Geim and Novoselov received awards for their pioneering research on graphene, notably the 2010 Nobel Prize in Physics.

== Commercialization ==
In 2014, the National Graphene Institute was announced to support applied research and development in partnership with other research organizations and industry.

Commercialization of graphene proceeded rapidly once commercial scale production was demonstrated. In 2014 two North East England commercial manufacturers, Applied Graphene Materials and Thomas Swan Limited (with Trinity College, Dublin researchers), began manufacturing. In East Anglia Cambridge Nanosystems operates a graphene powder production facility. By 2017, 13 years after creation of the first laboratory graphene electronic device, an integrated graphene electronics chip was produced commercially and marketed to pharmaceutical researchers by Nanomedical Diagnostics in San Diego.
