= Levidian Nanosystems =

UK manufacturing company

- Formerly: FGV Cambridge Nanosystems Ltd.
- Type: Private company
- Founded: Cambridge, UK (2012)
- Headquarters: Cambridge, United Kingdom
- Area served: Worldwide
- Products: Graphene
- Website: www.levidian.com

Levidian Nanosystems Limited (also known just as Levidian, formerly Cambridge Nanosystems) is a manufacturing company that specialises in the production of graphene.

== Background ==
The company has developed a process to produce graphene at ultra-high quality and on a larger scale than has previously been possible by using biogas waste products such as Methane.

Cambridge Nanosystems was spun out of Cambridge University in 2012, and in 2014 began partnering with Malaysia's Felda Global Ventures Holdings Berhad (FGV), a global agricultural and commodities business. FGV has abundant supplies of Methane as that is a by-product of their large-scale palm oil production. They aim to achieve synergy through the relationship with Cambridge Nanosystems whose technology will enable that waste material to be turned into valuable Graphene.

In December 2014, Cambridge Nanosystems was awarded £500,000 from the UK's Technology Strategy Board in order to increase capacity of their material. The funds were used to develop a manufacturing facility in Cambridge with the capability of producing up to 100 tonnes of Graphene a year for the European market. FGV and Cambridge Nanosystems are planning to build another plant in Malaysia to supply the Asian market.

The company founders are Dr Krzysztof Koziol, Jerome Joaug, Lukasz Kurzepa and Catharina Paukner. Chief scientist, Catharina Paukner has been described in the United Kingdom's media as "The First Lady of Graphene" and one of the eight UK business leaders to watch in 2015. In January 2015, Dr Anna Mieczakowski joined the management team as the first non co-founder in the role of Chief Operating Officer.

On 19 March 2015, the company won the Hewitsons Award for Business Innovation 2015 at a business award gala organised by Barclays and Cambridge News.

In September 2015, Cambridge Nanosystems has achieved the internationally recognised ISO 9001 certification, establishing it as one of the leaders in its field.

In April 2021, the company went through an acquisition and changed names to Levidian Nanosystems.

== LOOP Technology ==
Levidian's LOOP technology cracks methane into hydrogen and carbon, before locking the carbon into high-quality green graphene. It uses plasma technology to separate methane into its constituent atoms: carbon, locked into high-quality graphene, and hydrogen, which can either be used immediately or stored for future use.
