= Ethel Shakespear =

English geologist, public servant and philanthropist

Dame Ethel Shakespear DBE JP
- Born: Ethel Mary Reader Wood; 17 July 1871; Biddenham, Bedfordshire, England
- Died: 17 January 1946 (aged 74)
- Education: Bedford High School for Girls
- Alma mater: Newnham College, Cambridge
- Occupations: Geologist, public servant
- Known for: The Lower Ludlow Formation and its Graptolite Fauna
- Spouse: Gilbert Arden Shakespear
- Awards: Wollaston Fund & Murchison Medal

Dame Ethel Mary Reader Shakespear DBE JP (née Wood; 17 July 1871 – 17 January 1946) was an English geologist, public servant and philanthropist. She is most famously known for her work on the Lower Ludlow Formation and won several awards for her influential papers.

== Early life and education ==
Shakespear was born in Biddenham, Bedfordshire, the youngest daughter of the Reverend Henry Wood. She was educated at Bedford High School for Girls and Newnham College, Cambridge (1891–95), graduating in natural sciences. Upon collecting her degree in natural sciences alongside her close friend Gertrude Elles, they earned the nickname of Steamboat Ladies.

While at Cambridge, she was introduced to the work of John Edward Marr and Thomas McKenny Hughes. There, she was able to attend the geologic field outings alongside Hughes. During her time at Newnham College, she played tennis, took piano lessons, and became involved in Liberal politics, and it was here that she met her lifelong friend and collaborator Elles. In 1905, Shakespear was elected an associate of Newnham College and, in 1906, she took her D.Sc. During her time at Cambridge with Gertrude Ellas, they were also part of a greater community of female geologists, such as Ethel Skeat and Margaret Crosfield. Together these four woman formed what was called the Quartet of Cambridge female Geologists.

== Career ==
She studied rocks with Elles as one of their first joint projects in the Lake District. These studies were suggested by one of her previous professors, Marr. She continued her research alongside Elles, specifically on ancient rocks of the Welsh Borderlands as a research student at Newnham College.

In 1896, she became assistant to Charles Lapworth at Mason College (which later became the University of Birmingham). As Charles Lapworth's assistant during her time, Shakespear took photo's with a specialized camera, a camera lucidia, before turning them into full illustrations of fossils. Many of these illustrations would be used in many of her papers, such as her 1901 monograph.

In 1906, she earned her DSc from the University of Birmingham. Despite success in her field, she left her job with Lapworth in 1906 when she married Gilbert Arden Shakespear, a physics lecturer at the university whom she had met in Cambridge. However, she did remain as an associate of Newnham College for fifteen years. Despite encouragement to return to her field by her peers, she was unable due to her social work. Throughout most of her later life, Shakespear was involved with the study of graptolite in North Wales and around the Welsh Borderland area. Her monograph was to become a standard paleontological reference work for many years.

=== Papers ===
The earliest available paper published by Ethel Shakespear was a three-page section in the Cambridge Geological Magazine in 1895. With the help of Gertrude Ellas, she investigated the Drygill Shales and the fossil types found within the region in addition to the geological beds in which they were found. Their work primarily focused on the paleontological aspects of these fossils, providing insights into the ancient ecosystems and the types of organisms that existed during the time the shale was formed. In their research, Shakespear and Ellas meticulously documented various fossil specimens, analyzing their morphology and distribution. They aimed to understand the environmental conditions that led to the preservation of these fossils and what they could reveal about the Earth's history. What they found was a total of six different types fossils what were found within the shale that were uniformly distributed. The fossils found being, Trilobita, Ostracoda, Branchiopoda, Lamellibranchiata, Gasteropoda, and Cephalopoda. Their conclusions came to the result that from the Drygill Shale fossils, was that these fossils predate other sound at the same age within the previously investigated Lake District. This not only contributed to the scientific understanding of the Drygill shale but also helped in reconstructing the prehistoric environments in which these organisms lived.

The Conway Shales was the second research topic for Shakespear's second earliest paper (published on 8 January 1896) co-opted with Ellas during their time as students at the New Ham College (University of Cambridge) in Cambridge. It was a geological survey and mapping of the small town of Conway in Northern Wales. With a specific focus on an immediate area in the southern part of Conway, the map given in the paper depicts the area of interest, listing five different types of shale found within the region. The types of shale listed are, Denbighsire grits and flags, Wenlock shales, Tarannan shales, Birkhill shales, and Bala grit. The paper goes onto break down and explain the five types of shale found in the region south of Conway and even goes onto contrast it with similar shales found in other area's of England. The found among that the varying types of shale, one in particular, Tarannan shale, held Llandovery age rocks. Which according to Shakespear and Ellas's results, these rocks were closely related to another kind found in the southern regions of Scotland in addition to other areas of Northern England. The other four types of shale mentioned were not ground-breaking. As the held no particular connections to any other areas in England or Scotland.

In 1900, Shakespear published a paper on the Ludlow Formation, entitled "The Lower Ludlow Formation and its Graptolite Fauna" in the Journal of the Geological Society. It outlined how geologists can use the fauna to classify the mudstones found in the area.

Her research paper The graptolites of the Lower Ludlow Shales surrounding the Ludlow Group was published before her marriage in 1906. Her research on the Lower Ludlow Shales suggests a large number of fossils to be found in this section. The most famous of fossils found in this region was Cyathaspis, the oldest British vertebrate.

With Lapworth and Elles, she published a paper in the journal Monographs of the Palaeontographical Society on the biostratigraphy of the area from 1901 to 1914, entitled "A Monograph of British Graptolites." Shakespear was particularly responsible for the illustrations. This monograph was to become a standard palaeontological reference work for many years.

In collaboration with her husband, Gilbert Arden Shakespear, "The Tarannon Series of Tarannon" was published in the Geological Magazine in 1906. This was the final work published before her death.

== Other work ==
During the First World War, she devoted herself to helping disabled servicemen. Shakespear helped to found, and was honorary secretary of the Association of War Pension Committees in London. From 1917 to 1926 sat on the Special Grants Committee of the Ministry of Pensions.

Shakespear's influence was during the waning years of her life during the Second World War was just as influential during her time during the First World War. As she dedicated her time on her farm in Worstshire with her husband (1929) to that of the home front effort. And despite the lack of extra farmhands at the time, she and her husband bore the burden of meeting the high demands of the Ministry of Agriculture; even with times that her husband was away on illness. Shakespear carried on even at the cost of her own well-being.

Shakespear served on the Birmingham and Sutton Coldfield War Pensions Committee for several years.

Shakespear was appointed a justice of the peace for Birmingham in 1922, specialising in cases involving children and working-class girls. She was a family visitor for foster parents and invited many poor women and girls to stay in her home at Caldwell Hall, Upton Warren, Worcestershire.

Shakespear, in addition to her other services was also the head of two councils for women during her time. These two councils were located in Birmingham: the National Council of Women and the Federation of University Women. Her time on the National Council of Women lasted from 1929 to 1932. Her service at the head of these councils was marked by a commitment to improving the social and political status of women in the community. She organised events, discussions, and initiatives that aimed to mobilise women and encourage them to engage in local governance and decision-making processes.

== Honours and awards ==
In recognition of her work on the paper, "The Lower Ludlow Formation and its Graptolite Fauna", she was awarded the Wollaston Fund in 1904. In 1920, she received the Murchison Medal for her work on British Graptolites.

Shakespear was appointed Member of the Order of the British Empire (MBE) in 1918 for her war work and Dame Commander of the Order of the British Empire (DBE) in the 1920 civilian war honours for her work with the Birmingham War Pensions Committee.

== Personal life and death ==
Ethel and Gilbert Shakespear had one child, a daughter, who died in infancy.

Shakespear died of cancer in 1946, aged 74.

== Bibliography ==
- G. L. [Gertrude Lilian] Elles, Ethel M. R. (Wood) Shakespear, Charles Lapworth (Editor). A monograph of British graptolites, Printed for the Palæontographical Society, London, 1901–18.
- Ethel M. R. Shakespear, "I.—On some New Zealand Graptolites." Geological Magazine, 5, 1908/04, 145. DOI: 10.1017/S0016756800121727
