= Lapworth (disambiguation) =

Lapworth is a village and civil parish in Warwickshire, England.

Lapworth is also a last name and may refer to:

- Arthur Lapworth, a Scottish chemist
- Bill Lapworth, an American naval architect
- Charles Lapworth, an English geologist

Other uses:

- Lake Lapworth, a postulated glacial lake in Great Britain
- Lapworth Cirque, a cirque in the Shackleton Range, Antarctica
- Lapworth Medal, the highest award of the Palaeontological Association
- Lapworth Museum of Geology, a geological museum run by the University of Birmingham
- Lapworth railway station serves the village of Kingswood, Warwickshire, near the village of Lapworth
