= Retiolitoidea =

Retiolitoidea Temporal range: Katian–Ludfordian

Scientific classification
- Kingdom: Animalia
- Phylum: Hemichordata
- Class: Pterobranchia
- Subclass: Graptolithina
- Order: †Graptoloidea
- Infraorder: †Neograptina
- Superfamily: †Retiolitoidea; Lapworth, 1873

Families
- †Neodiplograptidae; †Retiolitidae

Superfamily of graptolites

Retiolitoidea is a superfamily of graptolites that includes the Neodiplograptidae and the Retiolitidae.

== Phylogeny ==
From Melchin et al. (2011).

- - Normalograptus (paraphyletic)
  - Metaclimacograptus (paraphyletic)
  - Hirsutograptus
  - Monograptoidea
  - Retiolitoidea
    - Neodiplograptus
    - Metabolograptus (paraphyletic)
    - "Normalograptus" praecursor
    - Korenograptus
    - Rickardsograptus
    - - Paraclimacograptus
      - Retiolitidae
        - Sudburigraptus
        - Paramplexograptus
        - - - Agetograptus
            - Rivagraptus (paraphyletic)
          - Glyptograptus (paraphyletic)
          - Comograptus
          - Parapetalolithus
          - - Petalolithus
            - Pseudorthograptus (paraphyletic)
            - - Hercograptus
              - Retiolitinae
