= Margaret Crosfield =

British palaeontologist

Margaret Chorley Crosfield (7 September 1859 – 13 October 1952) was a British paleontologist and geologist.

== Biography ==
Crosfield became an active member of the Geologists' Association in 1892, later becoming a council member in 1918. In 1894 she was elected to the British Association for the Advancement of Science. On 21 May 1919 she became the first, due to alphabetical primacy, of the first eight women to be elected Fellows of the Geological Society of London. Prior to that, in 1907, a decision was made by the Society to admit women as Associates, under the condition they distinguished themselves as geological investigators or submitted their own original research. She also was a member of the Paleontological Society from 1907–1932. She collaborated with Gertrude Elles (1872–1960), Ethel Wood (1871–1945), and Ethel Skeat (1869–1939). Crosfield and Skeat investigated the Denbighshire grits and flags from 1906 to 1909 and in 1911, using graptolite to establish a sequence.

Crosfield kept meticulous ordered notebooks and field specimens, some of which are kept at the British Geological Survey in Keyworth, Nottingham. The notebooks not only contain scientific data and observations but also give an insight into a life working in the field.

== Personal life ==
Margaret Chorley Crosfield grew up in Reigate, Surrey, where she lived her entire life. She never married, and died in 1952, aged 93.

She was the daughter of Joseph Crosfield, a wealthy tea merchant, and his second wife, Sarah. She had a keen interest in education, and served on the Reigate Education Committee for many years. Her obituary praised "her wonderful accuracy and industry" as a geologist, and described her as "always kindly and eager to help". Crosfield was an active campaigner for Women's suffrage, and often lectured local societies on social issues, as well as scientific topics. A branch of the Central Society for Women's Suffrage opened in Reigate in 1906, later becoming affiliated with the National Union of Women's Suffrage Societies in 1909, with this particular branch assuming the name of Reigate, Redhill and District Society for Women's Suffrage.

It is likely Margaret became involved in 1906 when the branch first opened in Reigate. She served as Honorary Secretary of the Reigate and Redhill Women's Suffrage Society, and as a member of the Friends' League for Women's Suffrage. Her brothers were supportive her suffrage activities, and actively donated. Indeed, some of her field notes were written on the back of suffragette note paper.

She and her brothers were involved in the Holmesdale Natural History Club, which is one of the oldest natural history societies in the country. Margaret was the secretary from 1907 onward.

Margaret's brother and father were two of the founders of Harrisons & Crosfield, which started as a tea merchant company and is now called Elementis. This provided her with the financial stability to pursue her own research.

== Education ==
Crosfield attended school at the Mount School, York, which was one of the first in the UK to send girls to University. At twenty years old, Crosfield went to study at Newnham College, Cambridge in 1878, in which she began the study of geology as part of her course. She took a period of leave due to illness. While she was on leave her father died in 1879. He left his children £8,200 in trust.

This money helped independently fund Crosfield's research and further her studies at Cambridge. With the inherited money, she did not need to work for a living and was able to focus on activities that interested her. She returned to the University 10 years later and gained special permission to study geology exclusively. Upon her return to Cambridge, she met two of her lifelong friends and fellow researchers, Ethel Gertrude Skeat, whom she worked extensively with on paleontological and stratigraphic research. Crosfield also was known to work with Gertrude Elles and Dame Ethel Shakespear by identifying and verifying fossil specimens that were collected on various field campaigns.

The concept of geological stratigraphic column began, however many parts of this theory needed to be confirmed with field evidence. Professor Charles Lapworth (University of Birmingham), and Professors McKenny Hughes, and Marr (University of Cambridge) encouraged Crosfield and Woods to undertake research in this field to help improving the understanding of the stratigraphy of the Lower Palaeozoic.

== Career ==
Crosfield, Skeat, and Johnston went on to survey two areas in Wales, resulting in two published articles. "On the Geology of the Neighbourhood of Carmarthen" in 1896 and "The Silurian Rocks of the Clwydian Range" in 1925. Both articles were published by "The Quarterly Journal of the geological society of London".

In her paper on Carmarthen, Crosfield surveyed four miles around the town and discovered syncline, collecting new species of trilobites. The objective in examining this district was to trace the continuation of the complex anticline which was discovered by the late Mr. T. Roberts, about 10 miles west of Carmarthen.

In 1906, along with Skeat and under the direction of Professor John Marr, Crosfield examined the "little-known series of Denbighshire Grits and Flags in the Clwydians, in order to establish a sequence by means of the graptolite fauna".

From 1906 to 1909, and again in 1911, geological surveys were conducted inside an area of seventy-two square miles their observations were published in Quarterly Journal of the Geological Society, volumes 52 (1896) and 81 (1925).

In 1914, she surveyed Wenlock limestone for Proceedings of the Geological Association with M.S Thompson and provided an account for C.E Salmon's publication on Surrey's flora.

Crosfield was an esteemed and active member of the Geologists' Association, later becoming a council member of said Association in 1899, working as a librarian from 1919 until 1923. In 1894 Crosfield was elected into the British Association for the Advancement of Science. During her time in the British Association for the Advancement of Science (now known as the British Science Association), she avidly advocated for respectful and professional treatment of women in the field.

In 1919, a law was passed for the acceptance of women into public societies, at which time Crosfield became inducted, along with five other women, into the Fellows of the Geological Society of London. From 1907 to 1932, Crosfield also played a role in the Palaeontological Society as well.

Crosfield was renowned for her detailed geologic notes and her meticulous organization of the wide array of field specimens that she had collected over the years.

Aside from her role as a woman within geological and palaeontological academia at the time, the notes gathered from Crosfield not only hold strictly geological significance. The notes often describe the nuances of living and working in the field, and the notes themselves were written on the back of suffragette paper; denoting her active role in the suffragette movement.

Margaret Crosfield was able to self-fund her research due to the inheritance of her father's wealth, and was not employed by a University or College.

== Contribution to geology ==
Crosfield published three research papers. The first was written with Ethel Skeat on the geology of Carmarthen in 1896. The paper was clear and formed the basis of the geological map produced by the British Geological Survey for the area. Her second publication was with Mary Johnston, on the Wenlock limestone of Shropshire. Finally, she wrote again with Ethel Skeat in 1925 on the geology of the Silurian rocks of the Clywdian Range, largely focusing on structural geology, notably, the cross sections and erosion of the region.

Alongside her publications, she travelled widely and kept detailed notes. These notes contained field notes, and records of specimen locations still seen in British Geological Survey in Keyworth and the Grosvenor Museum in Chester. In 1906 Professors McKenny Hughes, and Marr of the University of Cambridge along with Professor Lapworth of Mason Science College initiated a small group of woman including Margaret Crosfield and Ethel Skeat to research the Silurian and Ordovician rock of North Wales and the borders to solve the "Silurian problem". Unfortunately, the research of developing and understanding the Silurian and Ordovician stratigraphy of Northeast Wales is lost over time.

Margaret surveyed a four-mile radius around Carmarthen and while examining the syncline she discovered new features of stratigraphy and also collected a new species of trilobite.

She was one of the first six women to be elected as fellows of the Geological Society. Her contribution to Geology was one that paved way for many women in Geology. Her information and readings are still preserved to this day and are used to collect old findings.
