= Emelie Attersoll =

English naturalist (1800–1864)

- Born: 16 October 1800; Fulham, England
- Died: 10 November 1864 (aged 64); Southborough, Kent
- Other names: Emily Attersoll; Emilie Attersoll; Emelia Attersoll; Emilia Attersoll; Miss Attersole
- Occupation: natural history collector

Emelie Attersoll (1800–1864) was an English naturalist and writer who collected specimens for the British Museum.

== Family ==
Attersoll's parents were Joseph Attersoll and Martha Attersoll (née Webb), who had married in 1783. Joseph Attersoll was a corn merchant who had residences at 66 Portland Place in London and at Dorset Cottage, Crab Tree, Fulham. Emelie Attersoll had five older siblings including John Attersoll (c. 1784–1822, briefly a Member of Parliament for Wooton Basset), writer and botanist Maria Attersoll (1794–1877) and writer Julia Attersoll (1797–1875).

Joseph Attersoll died in 1812, and it is thought likely that the unmarried Attersoll sisters lived with family members after their mother died in 1822.

Emelie and Maria Attersoll collaborated occasionally to write religious and instructional works, e.g., The History of Fanny Mason, about an honest and pious domestic servant girl who eventually graduates to a happy marriage.

In the 1840s and 1850s, Emelie Attersoll lived in a household with her sisters Maria and Julia at Tonbridge Wells.

== Attersoll's collecting at Malta ==
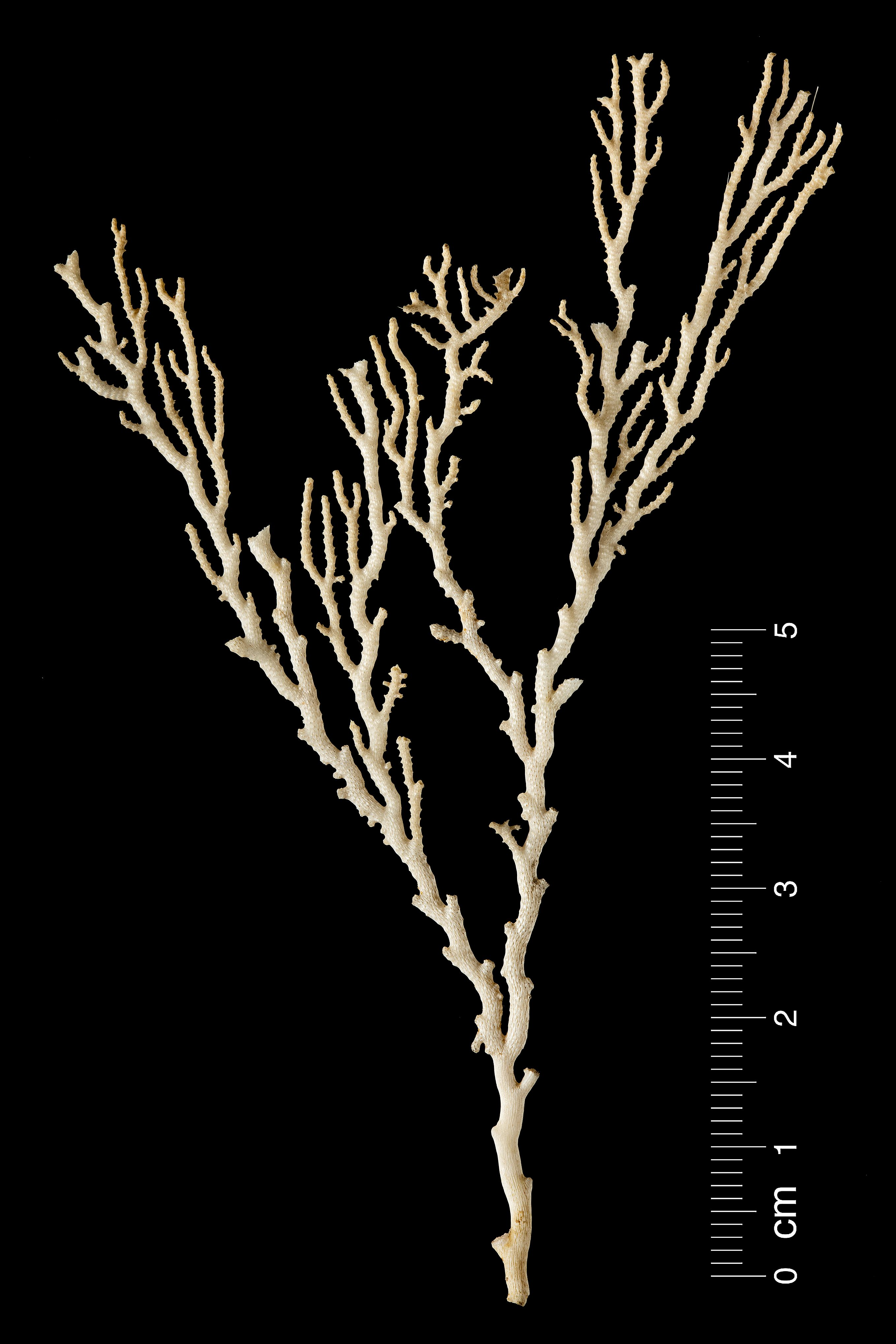
A specimen of Hornera frondiculata (Lamarck, 1816) collected at Malta by Miss E. Attersoll (NHMUK: Z BRY 1839.6.26.186)

Attersoll was attached to the court of Queen Dowager Adelaide and accompanied her upon a voyage to Malta in 1838 for the Queen's health, during which Attersoll collected fossils, Crustaceans, Echinoderms, Mollusks, coral, Bryozoa, insects and reptiles.

In 1839 when Queen Adelaide and her companions returned to the U.K. aboard the HMS Hastings, bad weather caused a "melancholy accident" in which a sailor fell from the rigging and was drowned, grieving everybody aboard the ship.

Attersoll presented most of her Maltese specimens to the British Museum in 1839, and John George Children and the Museum's Trustees agreed to recompense Attersoll for packing materials and collecting costs. Attersoll's Maltese fossils, along with those collected by Thomas Spratt and Dr J W Collings, were initially presented to the Geological Society of London and were examined by Richard Owen, Philip Egerton and William Lonsdale. Attersoll's fossils went on to be donated by the Geological Society to the British Museum (Natural History) in 1911, reuniting them with her modern specimens. Today Attersoll's specimens are at the Natural History Museum, London.

Emelie Attersoll also donated two small Egyptian faience shabti figures to the British Museum in 1839, from the 21st and 30th dynasties.

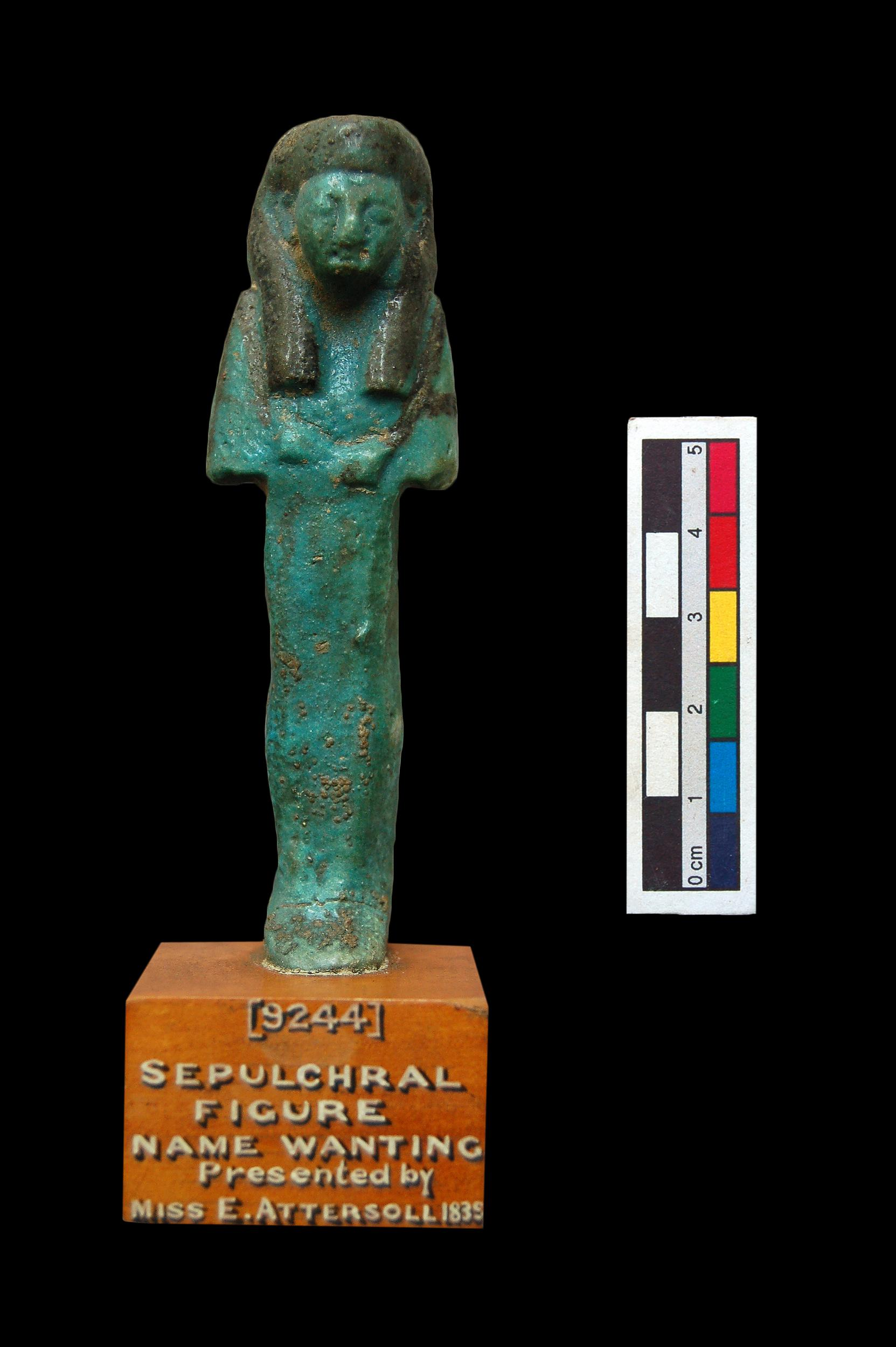
Egyptian 21st Dynasty blue glazed composition shabti with painted detail. Donated to the British Museum by Miss E Attersoll in 1839 (BM EA9244).

== Death ==
Emelie Attersoll died at Southborough, near Tonbridge Wells, on 10 November 1864.

== Selected published works ==
- History of Thomas Martin, etc., 1823 (with Maria Attersoll)
- The History of Fanny Mason, 1823 (with Maria Attersoll)
- The Curate of Marsden; or, pastoral conversations between a minister and his parishioners: London, Longman and Company, 1834 (with Maria Attersoll)
