= Elevation crater =

Geologic theory

The elevation crater theory is a now-discredited geologic theory originating in the 18th and 19th centuries which intended to explain the origin of mountains and orogens, holding that mountains formed by vertical movements associated with volcanism.

The idea that mountains could be formed by magma and volcanic activity was expressed as early as 1777 by Peter Simon Pallas, who claimed the Ural and Altai Mountains had been formed this way. Pallas based his ideas on the granitic central axes that he had observed in both ranges. The theory was revived and elaborated further by Leopold von Buch in the 19th century. Observations supporting this view were also given by Alexander von Humboldt in his book Kosmos.

Humbold and Buch considered basaltic volcanism to be linked to elevation craters and trachyte to be the product of "true volcanoes". Otto Wilhelm Hermann von Abich applied the theory to the Caucasus Mountains and, following the views of Buch and Humboldt, linked mountain building to volcanism, which led him to take interest in the volcanoes of the Caucasus in the area.

The geologist Bernhard Studer refined the idea further. Working in the Alps, he considered the mountains to be roughly symmetrical with a Mittelzone ('middle area') containing the igneous rocks that he believed had uplifted them. The rocks were grouped in twelve Centralmassen. To the north and the south of the Mittelzone were two equivalent marginal zones: Nörliche Nebenzone and Südliche Nebenzone. The theory, as posited by Studer, was popular among geologists in Switzerland and nearby areas until the 1870s.

== Bibliography ==
- Şengör, Celâl (1982). "Classical theories of orogenesis". In Miyashiro, Akiho; Aki, Keiiti; Şengör, Celâl (eds.). Orogeny. John Wiley & Sons. ISBN 0-471-103764.
