= Lazarus Fletcher =

British geologist

Sir Lazarus Fletcher (3 March 1854 – 6 January 1921) was a British geologist. He was elected a Fellow of the Royal Society in 1889 and won the Wollaston Medal of the Geological Society in 1912. Fletcher was knighted in 1916.

Fletcher was Keeper of Mineralogy at the Natural History Museum from 1880 to 1909, and director from 1909 to 1919.
