= Henry Woods (geologist) =

British palaeontologist; (1868–1952)

Henry Woods (18 December 1868, in Cottenham – 4 April 1952, in Meldreth) was a British paleontologist.

In 1890 Woods earned a B.A. from the University of Cambridge, then became there curator of the Woodwardian Museum, earning an M.A. in 1894. In 1895 he won the Sedgwick prize. At Cambridge University, Woods was from 1892 to 1899 a demonstrator in paleobotany, and from 1894 to 1899 a demonstrator in paleozoology until his promotion to lecturer. From 1899 until his retirement in 1934 he was a lecturer in paleontology at Cambridge. In 1910 he married paleontologist Ethel Skeat, the daughter of Walter William Skeat, professor of Anglo-Saxon. Even after his retirement, Woods remained at the university as a librarian for the paleontology department until he was over eighty.

In 1940 Woods received the Wollaston Medal and in 1918 the Lyell Medal. He was elected a Fellow of the Royal Society in 1916. He was an honorary member of the Yorkshire Philosophical Society and the Royal Society of New Zealand.

He is buried at the Parish of the Ascension Burial Ground in Cambridge; his wife is buried with him.

== Works ==
- Palaeontology, invertebrate, Cambridge University Press, 7th edn. 1937, Online (1st edn. 1893)
- Elementary Palaeontology for geology students, Cambridge University Press 1893
- Catalogue of the Type Fossils in the Woodwardian Museum, Cambridge, Cambridge 2010 (1st edn. 1891)
- Trilobita and Eurypterida, in Sidney Harmer et al. Cambridge Natural History, vol. 4, 1909
