= Leonard Johnston Wills =

British geologist

- Born: 27 February 1884; Sutton Coldfield, Birmingham, UK
- Died: 12 December 1979 (aged 95); Romsley, Worcestershire, UK
- Education: Uppingham School; University of Cambridge
- Occupation: Geologist
- Spouse: Maud Janet Ewing (m. 1910; died 1952)

Professor Leonard Johnston Wills (27 February 1884 – 12 December 1979) – known as 'Jack' to friends and family – was one of the leading British geologists of his generation. He held the Chair of Geology at the University of Birmingham from 1932 to 1949, and received many honours including the Geological Society of London's highest award, the Wollaston Medal, in 1954.

== Family background ==
Jack Wills was born on 27 February 1884 in the Birmingham suburb of Erdington, into a prosperous and well-educated manufacturing family, with an interest in science.

His paternal great-grandfather, William Wills, had been a prosperous Birmingham attorney from a nonconformist, Unitarian, family. William Wills was involved with the British Association for the Advancement of Science and wrote various papers on meteorology and other scientific observations. Jack Wills's grandfather bought an edge-tool business in Nechells, AW Wills & Son, which manufactured such things as scythes and sickles. Jack Wills's father, William Leonard Wills (1858–1911), was a science graduate of Owens College, Manchester, and took over the running of the family business. He was interested in botany, zoology, geology and natural sciences generally, as well as in the developing science of photography.

His mother, Gertrude Annie Wills née Johnston (1855–1939), was the only daughter (with six brothers) of a well-known Birmingham doctor, Dr James Johnston.

One of Jack Wills's great uncles was Sir Alfred Wills, a well-known Victorian mountaineer and judge. Sir Alfred was a founder member and early President of the Alpine Club, and was interested in the origin and shaping of the Alps – an interest which may well have influenced his great-nephew. Sir Alfred translated from French into English one of the classic early works on the geomorphology and glaciology of the mountains, Louis Rendu's Théorie des Glaciers de la Savoie (1840). As a judge, Sir Alfred presided over the second Oscar Wilde trial and sentenced the writer to two years in Reading Gaol.

== Early years and school ==
Jack Wills was brought up in the country near Birmingham, initially in Wylde Green, then Sutton Coldfield, and finally Barnt Green, all then villages. He went to the Lickey Hills preparatory school before going in 1898 to Uppingham School in Rutland. His house was Fircroft, where the housemaster was the Revd Raven. The academic emphasis was firmly on the classics, with natural sciences receiving little attention. In spite of this, his interest in geology, encouraged by his father, was already developing.

== Cambridge and siblings ==
Jack Wills went up to King's College, Cambridge in October 1903 as a Scholar. He elected to read Natural Sciences in Part I with Geology in Part II. In 1906, he graduated BA with a First in the Natural Sciences Tripos Part I, and in 1907 made it a Double First with a First also in the Part II. In the same year he was awarded the Harkness Research Scholarship and began his postgraduate work.

In 1909, he was one of only two postgraduates to become Fellows of King's College Cambridge, the other being the Old Etonian economist John Maynard Keynes. In the same year Jack Wills was awarded the Walsingham Medal. His Fellowship lasted until 1915.

Thus his Cambridge career lasted from his going up to King's in 1903 until the end of his Fellowship in 1915. During this period there were several family connections with Cambridge. The younger of his two sisters, Lucy Wills, a pioneer in the field of haematology, went up to Newnham College in 1907; she later discovered the role of folate, one of the B vitamins, in preventing anemia in pregnancy. Their younger brother Alfred Gordon went up (also to King's) in 1910. Jack Wills's third sibling, the elder of the two sisters, Edith, married Morris Heycock, son of another Fellow of King's, the chemist Charles Heycock FRS.

Jack Wills himself married Maud Janet Ewing in 1910, the daughter of the engineer scientist Sir James Alfred Ewing. Ewing was yet another King's Fellow, and subsequently during the Great War was the originator of Room 40, Britain's first cryptanalytic operation, the precursor of Bletchley Park in the Second World War and the Government Communications Headquarters, GCHQ, now.

== Norse sword ==
In 1907, while out cycling from Cambridge, Jack Wills sheltered from a thunderstorm in a quarry at Hauxton Mill, just south of Trumpington, and noticed something unusual protruding from the rock face. It turned out to be a perfectly preserved tenth- or eleventh-century double-edged Norse sword, probably a relic of a Viking invasion. It is now in the Museum of Archaeology and Ethnology at Cambridge.

== 1907 – 1913 ==
After graduating in 1907, Jack Wills did two years research under the auspices of the Harkness Scholarship, focusing on the plant and animal fossils of the Bromsgrove district in the Midlands. In 1909, the year he became a Fellow of King's, he started a four-year appointment with the Geological Survey of Great Britain, mapping the rocks of the Llangollen area of north Wales.

== Birmingham University ==
In 1913, he started his long association with the geology department of Birmingham University, joining as lecturer in Geology and Geomorphology, under Professor William Boulton. Birmingham University awarded him his PhD in 1920. In 1932, when Boulton retired, Jack Wills succeeded him as Professor and Head of Department, remaining in this post for seventeen years until his retirement in turn in 1949. He then became Professor Emeritus, retaining his link with the department until his death in 1979, a few weeks short of his ninety-sixth birthday.

== Marriage and family ==
Jack Wills's marriage to Maud Janet Ewing in 1910 proved a particularly happy one. They had two children: Leonard born in 1911, and Penissa ('Penty') born in 1913. Penty never married, but Leonard did and had one son, David, who in turn had three children, Jack Wills's great-grandchildren.

Jack Wills suffered various family bereavements, losing before the age of thirty both his father in 1911 and his sister Edith in 1913. Later he lost his wife Janet in 1952, and his son Leonard in 1976. He had several serious medical issues, suffering a severe coronary thrombosis shortly after his retirement, losing the sight of one eye, and losing all his body hair to alopecia.

== Farley Cottage ==
In 1926, the Willses bought Farley Cottage, with some 45 surrounding acres in a valley near the Lickey Hills between Bromsgrove and Romsley, together with the neighbouring mediaeval Shut Mill. In 1926, this small and idyllic estate was extremely remote, with no mains electricity or water. Jack Wills installed a turbine which generated electricity from the mill pool. A ram supplied water from a spring. There was a telephone: Romsley 3. In 1936, Farley Cottage was enlarged and modernised by their architect son, Leonard, then newly graduated from the Architectural Association.

Farley Cottage, its gardens, orchard and surrounding valley, was the setting for the Willses' generous hospitality to many – family, friends, and geological colleagues – over the next forty years. 'The Professor' did much for local history, archaeology, and geology, and was largely instrumental in saving the valley from being flooded as a reservoir for Birmingham. He was a churchwarden at Romsley from 1930 to 1936. He was a keen gardener with extensive horticultural knowledge.

In 1956, Jack Wills decided to gift Farley Cottage and its land to the Field Studies Council ('FSC'), subject to him being able to continue to live there for his lifetime. The intention was that on his death the house would be used by the FSC as a Field Studies Centre. In 1965, the FSC decided that Farley Cottage was not of a size to be economic as a Centre, but that it would be sold and the proceeds put towards buying and restoring a new Centre. This was done, and Nettlecombe Court in Somerset has since been known as the Leonard Wills Field Centre. Jack Wills and his daughter Penty moved to a small bungalow half a mile away from Farley Cottage in the same valley, where he lived until his death in 1979.

== Geology ==
Jack Wills's researches started with the plant and animal fossils of the Keuper sediments exposed in quarries around Bromsgrove, and he retained a lifelong interest in the continental deposits and fossils of the Upper Paleozoic and Triassic.

He wrote accounts of new ostracoderm fishes from the late Silurian and Devonian, and became a particular specialist on terrestrial arthropods, notably with delicate dissections and interpretations of fossilized Triassic scorpions and Carboniferous eurypterids. He developed ingenious methods of dissection, revealing details even of their respiratory and reproductive organs.

His research work then took him into Lower Paleozoic stratigraphy, the Trias to Quaternary succession of the Severn valley and the origin of the Ironbridge Gorge. His interests developed into more recent geological history, the Pleistocene deposits of the Midlands, and the evidence for extensive, ice-dammed lakes of which one, named by him Lake Lapworth (after Charles Lapworth the Professor at Birmingham until 1913), covered most of the north-west Midlands.

However, the work which was to earn him lasting fame was the putting together of all then available information on surface and subsurface structures with the aim of producing a sequential picture of the geological evolution of the British Isles. This work continued until his last paper at the age of 93.

== Books and publications ==
Jack Wills's publications covered a span of over seventy years. His first were two papers in 1907 about fossils in the Bromsgrove area. His last was a Palaeogeological Map produced in 1978.

Amongst the numerous papers and books, the highlights included a paper in 1910 in the Proceedings of the Geologists' Association (Volume XXI, Part 5 pages 249–331) entitled On the Fossiliferous Lower Keuper Rocks of Worcestershire with Descriptions of some of the Plants and Animals Discovered Therein. In 1935 the same publication (Volume XLVI, Part 2 pages 211–246) published An Outline of the Palaeogeography of the Birmingham Country.

In 1947, the British Palaeontographical Society published his Monograph in two parts entitled British Triassic Scorpions, and in 1973 the Geological Society published his Memoir entitled A Palaeogeological Map of the Palaeozoic Floor below the Permian and Mesozoic Formations in England and Wales.

His first book appeared in 1911 – a guide to Worcestershire in the Cambridge County Geographies series, published by Cambridge University Press. This covers all aspects of the county with, not surprisingly, a considerable emphasis on its geology and natural history.

However, his major works were his four imaginative and influential textbooks written between 1929 and 1956.

The first two were:

• Physiographical Evolution of Britain (Edward Arnold, 1929) and

• The Palaeogeography of the Midlands (Liverpool University Press/Hodder & Stoughton, 1948).

These presented his research into the deep structure and evolution of the British Isles and his pioneering interpretations of subsurface data.

The second two, both published after his retirement from the Chair of Geology at Birmingham, were:

• A Palaeogeographical Atlas of the British Isles (Blackie, 1951) and

• Concealed Coalfields (Blackie, 1956).

The research work embodied in these second two titles had considerable economic significance. As BP's senior geologist Sir Peter Kent noted, the Atlas made Jack Wills a household name among petroleum geologists, and Concealed Coalfields became the bible of National Coal Board geologists.

His final publication, at the age of 93, was another Memoir published in 1978 by the Geological Society of London, entitled A Palaeogeological Map of the Lower Palaeozoic Floor below the cover of Upper Devonian, Carboniferous and Later Formations.

== Degrees and honours ==
Cambridge University awarded Jack Wills his BA in 1906, his MA in 1910, and his ScD in 1928. Cambridge also awarded him the Harkness Scholarship in 1907 and the Walsingham Medal in 1909. He was a Fellow of King's College from 1909 to 1915.

Birmingham University awarded him his PhD in 1920. In 1949, the year of his retirement from the Chair of Geology, he became Professor Emeritus.

The Geological Society of London awarded him the Lyell Medal in 1936 and then the Wollaston Medal, its highest award to geologists throughout the world, in 1954. Finally and uniquely, in 1976 when he was 92, the Geological Society of London made him an Honorary Fellow, the only British geologist to be so honoured.

== Old age ==
One of the most remarkable features of Jack Wills's life was not only his longevity, but also the amount of geological work, both research and publications, which was done after his retirement. He retired in 1949, was widowed in 1952, but continued to work more or less up to his death on 12 December 1979. This was made possible by the loving care provided by his unmarried daughter Penty. She had moved back in with her parents after working in occupied Germany for the Control Commission after the end of the Second World War. She initially acted as housekeeper, and cared devotedly for her father both at Farley Cottage and in the bungalow to which they moved in 1965 on the sale of Farley Cottage by the FSC.
