= David D. Pollard =

American professor in geomechanics and structural geology (born 1943)

David Dave Pollard
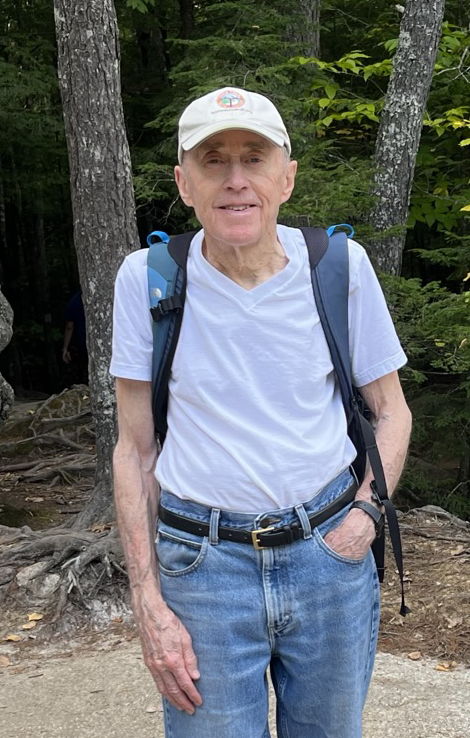
- Born: October 12, 1943 (age 82); Pasadena, California, U.S.
- Education: Pomona College (1965); Stanford University (1969); Imperial College, University of London (1970)
- Known for: Structural geology and Geomechanics
- Scientific career
- Fields: Quantitative Structural Geology and geomechanics
- Workplaces: Stanford University

David D. Pollard (born October 12, 1943) is an American professor in geomechanics and structural geology at Stanford University.

== Education and career ==
Pollard earned a B.A. in geology from Pomona College in 1965, followed by a Ph.D. in geology from Stanford University in 1969 and a Diploma of Imperial College in geology from Imperial College London in the same year.

He spent four years at the University of Rochester and about a decade with the United States Geological Survey in Menlo Park, California, before returning to Stanford. Pollard joined the Stanford faculty in 1983 and became the Barney and Estelle Morris Professor of Earth Sciences. He retired from the university on September 30, 2016, and subsequently held emeritus status. Stanford describes his research as combining quantitative field observations with laboratory experiments and computer modeling based on continuum and fracture mechanics to investigate faulting, fracturing and rock deformation.

Professional appointments

- Assistant Professor, University of Rochester, September 1970 – June 1974
- Geophysicist and Project Chief, US Geological Survey (USGS), July 1974 – August 1983
- Associate Professor, Applied Earth Sciences, Stanford University (1983-1986)
- Associate Professor, Geology, Stanford University (1984-1986)
- Professor, Applied Earth Sciences and Geology, Stanford University (1986-1993)
- Professor, Geological & Environmental Sciences, Stanford University (1993-2015)

=== Professional activities ===
- Morris Professor of Earth Sciences, Stanford University, August 1983 – present
- Member, editorial advisory board, Journal of Structural Geology.
- Developer of Poly3D, a boundary element computer program to analyse faults and fractures.
- Co-founder of IGEOSS, a French company developing software for the hydrocarbon industry (acquired by Schlumberger in 2010).
- Author and producer of A Complete Suite, a musical allegory exploring uses of continuum mechanics in structural geology.
- Editor, New Departures in Structural Geology and Tectonics, an NSF-sponsored white paper on research opportunities.
- Fellow of the Geological Society of America and of the American Geophysical Union.

== Research ==
Pollard's research has focused on the mechanical processes responsible for the formation and evolution of geological structures, particularly faults, fractures, folds and igneous intrusions. His work combines observations of geological structures with mathematical and computational models derived from continuum and fracture mechanics. His research has also examined the effects of faults and fractures on the movement of magma, groundwater and hydrocarbons and their role in earthquake generation and volcanic processes.

A major theme of Pollard's work has been the application of mechanical principles to structural geology. The Geological Society of America's citation for his 2016 Career Contribution Award credited him with advancing the quantitative application of mechanics to structural geology while emphasizing the importance of combining mechanical models with field observations. The citation identified contributions involving rock fracture, igneous intrusion, shear-zone formation, deformation bands, folding and fluid flow through fracture systems.

One of Pollard's influential areas of research has been the mechanics of fractures and faults. His work with Paul Segall on the mechanics of discontinuous faults examined the mechanical behavior of faults using quantitative models.Pollard and Atilla Aydin also published a major review of research on geological jointing in the Geological Society of America Bulletin in 1988, examining the development of ideas about the origin, propagation and interaction of joints and the application of fracture mechanics to their study.

Pollard's research has also addressed the mechanics of igneous intrusions and the deformation produced by dikes, sills and laccoliths. His early work on the Henry Mountains of Utah used mechanical models to investigate the deformation of overlying strata during the growth of laccolithic intrusions.

== Computational geomechanics ==
Pollard was involved in the development of Poly3D, a three-dimensional boundary-element computer program for modeling faults and fractures. Stanford identifies him as the developer of Poly3D, while a United States Geological Survey technical report documents the associated Poly3D, Poly3Dinv and Poly3DGUI software developed for academic use. .The Poly3D approach was subsequently used in studies of geological structures and fault systems. For example, research on the mechanical interaction of normal faults used three-dimensional boundary-element modeling, while later work incorporated Poly3D-based methods into analyses of fault slip and stress fields.

== Books ==
- Fundamentals of Structural Geology, 2005, published by Cambridge University Press, along with co-authors Fletcher R.
- Structural Geology: A Quantitative Introduction, 2020, published by Cambridge University Press, along with co-authors Stephen J. Martel.

== Honors and awards ==
- Wollaston Medal of the Geological Society of London (2021)
- Career Contribution Award, Structural Geology and Tectonics Division, Geological Society of America (2016)
- Best Paper of the Year Award, Structural Geology and Tectonics Division, Geological Society of America (2007)
- Fellow, American Geophysical Union (2007–Present)
- Fellow, Geological Society of America (1996–Present)
- Outstanding Teacher Award, School of Earth Sciences, Stanford University (1987–1988)
- Applied Research Award, U. S. National Committee on Rock Mechanics (1987)

== Notable publications ==
- Pollard, DD, Johnson, AM, 1973, Mechanics of growth of some laccolithic intrusions in Henry mountains, Utah .2. Bending and failure of overburden layers and sill formation, Tectonophysics Volume: 18 Issue: 3–4 Pages: 311–354
- DD Pollard, 1973, Derivation and evaluation of a mechanical model for sheet intrusions, Tectonophysics 19 (3), 233–269
- P Segall, DD Pollard, 1980, Mechanics of discontinuous faults, Journal of Geophysical Research: Solid Earth 85(B8), 4337–4350
- RC Fletcher, DD Pollard, 1981, Anticrack model for pressure solution surfaces, Geology 9 (9), 419–424
- Delaney, P. and Pollard, D.D., 1981, Deformation of host rocks and flow of magma during growth of minette dikes and breccia-bearing intrusions near Ship Rock, New Mexico: U.S. Geological Survey Professional Paper, 1202, 61 p.
- DD Pollard, P Segall, PT Delaney, 1982, Formation and interpretation of dilatant echelon cracks, Geological Society of America Bulletin 93 (12), 1291–1303
- Segall, P., and Pollard, D.D., 1983, Nucleation and growth of strike-slip faults in granite: Journal of Geophysical Research, v. 88, p. 555-568
- Delaney, P.T., Pollard, D.D., Ziony, J.I., and McKee, E.H., 1986, Field relations between dikes and joints: emplacement processes and paleo-stress analysis. Journal of Geophysical Research, v. 91, p. 4920-4938
- Pollard, D.D. and Segall, P., 1987, Theoretical displacement and stresses near fractures in rock: with applications to faults, joints, veins, dikes, and solution surfaces. In B.K. Atkinson, ed., Fracture Mechanics of Rock, Academic Press, Inc., pp. 277-349
- DD Pollard, 1987, Elementary fracture mechanics applied to the structural interpretation of dykes, Mafic dyke swarms 34, 5–24
- Rubin, A.M., and Pollard, D.D., 1988, Dike-induced faulting in rift zones of Iceland and Afar: Geology, v. 16, pp. 413-417
- DD Pollard, A Aydin, 1988, Progress in understanding jointing over the past century, Geological Society of America Bulletin 100(8), 1181–1204
- J Olson, DD Pollard, 1989, Inferring paleostresses from natural fracture patterns: A new method, Geology 17 (4), 345–348
- MA Antonellini, A Aydin, DD Pollard, 1994, Microstructure of deformation bands in porous sandstones at Arches National Park, Utah, Journal of structural geology 16 (7), 941–959
- R Bürgmann, DD Pollard, SJ Martel, 1994, Slip distributions on faults: effects of stress gradients, inelastic deformation, heterogeneous host-rock stiffness, and fault interaction, Journal of Structural Geology 16 (12), 1675–1690
- Renshaw, C. E., and Pollard, D.D., 1995, An experimentally verified criterion for propagation across unbounded frictional interfaces in brittle, linear elastic materials: International Journal of Rock Mechanics and Mining Science, v. 32, p. 237-249
- Wu, Hq, Pollard, DD, 1995, An experimental-study of the relationship between joint spacing and layer thickness, Journal of Structural Geology Volume: 17 Issue: 6 Pages: 887–905
- EJM Willemse, DD Pollard, A Aydin, 1996, Three-dimensional analyses of slip distributions on normal fault arrays with consequences for fault scaling, Journal of Structural Geology 18 (2), 295–309
- Willemse, EJM, Pollard, DD, Aydin, 1996, A, Three-dimensional analyses of slip distributions on normal fault arrays with consequences for fault scaling, Journal of Structural Geology Volume: 18 Issue: 2–3 Pages: 295–309
- JG Crider, DD Pollard, 1998, Fault linkage: three‐dimensional mechanical interaction between echelon normal faults, Journal of Geophysical Research: Solid Earth (1978–2012) 103 (B10), 24373-24391
- L Maerten, EJM Willemse, DD Pollard, K Rawnsley, 1999, Slip distributions on intersecting normal faults, Journal of Structural Geology 21 (3), 259–272
- Bai, T., and Pollard, D.D, 2000, Fracture spacing in layered rocks: a new explanation based on the stress transition. Journal of Structural Geology, v. 22, p. 43-57
- T Bai, DD Pollard, 2000, Fracture spacing in layered rocks: a new explanation based on the stress transition, Journal of Structural Geology 22 (1), 43–57
- T Bai, DD Pollard, H Gao, 2000, Explanation for fracture spacing in layered materials, Nature 403 (6771), 753–756
- L Maerten, DD Pollard, F Maerten, 2001, Digital mapping of three-dimensional structures of the Chimney Rock fault system, central Utah, Journal of Structural Geology 23 (4), 585–592
- L Maerten, P Gillespie, DD Pollard, 2002, Effects of local stress perturbation on secondary fault development, Journal of Structural Geology 24 (1), 145–153
- KR Sternlof, JW Rudnicki, DD Pollard, 2005, Anticrack inclusion model for compaction bands in sandstone, Journal of Geophysical Research: Solid Earth (1978–2012) 110 (B11)
- N Bellahsen, P Fiore, DD Pollard, 2006, The role of fractures in the structural interpretation of Sheep Mountain Anticline, Wyoming, Journal of Structural Geology 28 (5), 850–867
- WA Griffith, G Di Toro, G Pennacchioni, DD Pollard, 2008, Thin pseudotachylytes in faults of the Mt. Abbot quadrangle, Sierra Nevada: Physical constraints for small seismic slip events, Journal of Structural Geology 30 (9), 1086–1094
- GE Hilley, I Mynatt, DD Pollard, 2010, Structural geometry of Raplee Ridge monocline and thrust fault imaged using inverse Boundary Element Modeling and ALSM data, Journal of Structural Geology 32 (1), 45–58
- JO Kaven, F Maerten, DD Pollard, 2011, Mechanical analysis of fault slip data: Implications for paleostress analysis, Journal of structural geology 33 (2), 78–91
- F Maerten, EH Madden, DD Pollard, L Maerten, 2016, Incorporating fault mechanics into inversions of aftershock data for the regional remote stress, with application to the 1992 Landers, California earthquake, Tectonophysics, 674, 52–64
