= Bernhard Studer =

Swiss geologist (1794–1887)

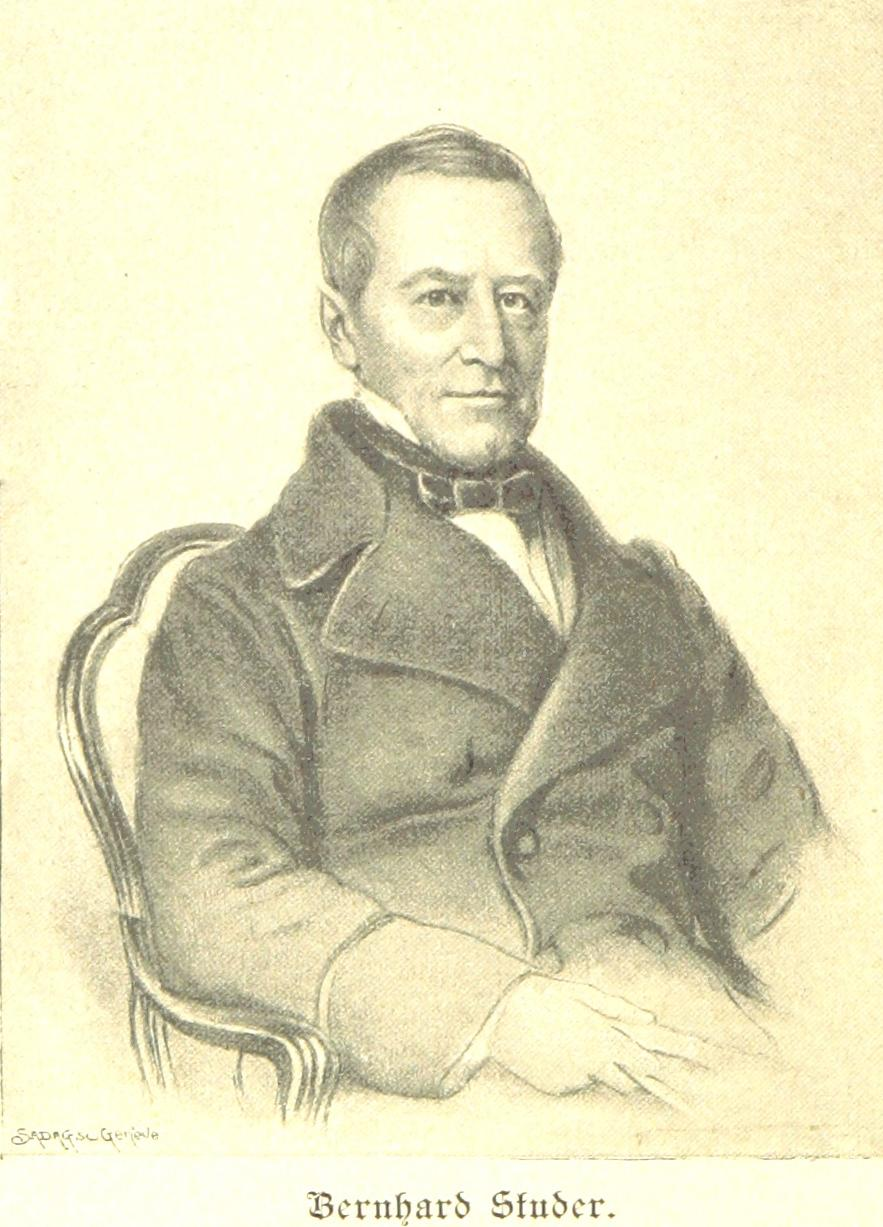
- Born: 21 August 1794; Büren an der Aare, Switzerland
- Died: 2 May 1887 (aged 92); Bern, Switzerland
- Known for: Geology of the Alps; Elevation crater theory
- Father: Samuel Emanuel Studer
- Awards: Wollaston Medal (1879)
- Scientific career
- Fields: Geology

Bernhard Studer HFRSE (21 August 1794 – 2 May 1887), was a Swiss geologist who published a two-volume Geologie der Schweiz (Geology of Switzerland, 1851,1853) that helped subsequent geologists like Eduard Suess despite the fact that he suggested the formation of the alps by the now obsolete primary uplift theory.

== Biography ==
Studer was born at Buren an der Aare near Bern on 21 August 1794. He was the son of Samuel Emanuel Studer, a malacologist and pastor, and Maria Margaretha Walther. Studer was educated to become a clergyman, but his interests later switched to sciences. In 1815 he became a teacher of mathematics at the gymnasium in Bern, and during the following year, began studying geology at University of Göttingen as a pupil of Johann Friedrich Ludwig Hausmann. He subsequently furthered his education at Freiburg, Berlin and Paris.

In 1825 he published his first major work, Beyträge zu einer Monographie der Molasse. Later on, he commenced his detailed investigations of the western Alps, and published in 1834 his Geologie der westlichen Schweizer-Alpen. In the same year, largely through his influence, the University of Bern was established and he became the first professor of geology. His Geologie der Schweiz in two volumes (1851–1853), and his geological maps of Switzerland, prepared with the assistance of Arnold Escher von der Linth, are high points of his research. In 1850 he was elected a Foreign Member of the Geological Society of London.

In 1859 he organized the geological survey of Switzerland, being appointed president of the commission, and retaining this position until the end of his life. It was remarked by Jules Marcou that Studer was present at the first meeting of the Société helvétique des sciences naturelles at Geneva on October 6, 1815, and remained a member during 72 years. In 1864, he was elected as a member of the American Philosophical Society. He was awarded the Wollaston medal by the Geological Society of London, in 1879. In 1882, he was elected a Foreign Honorary Member of the American Academy of Arts and Sciences.
