= Wollaston Medal =

Scientific award for geology

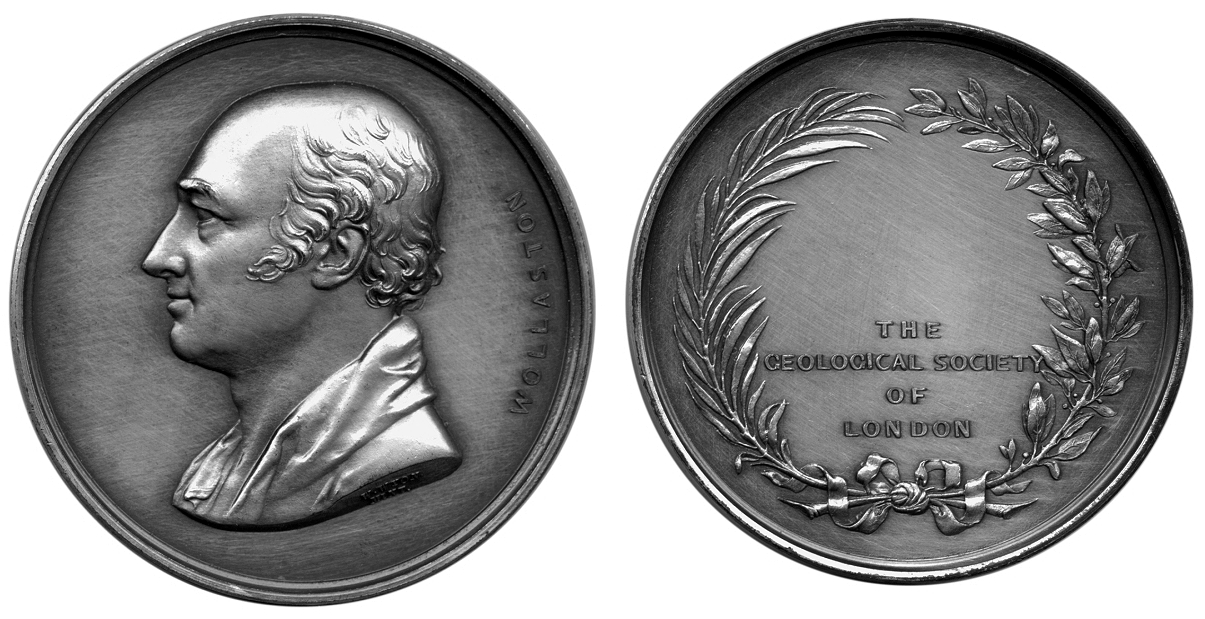
- Front and reverse sides of the Wollaston Medal
- Awarded for: Significant contributions to geology
- Sponsored by: Geological Society of London
- Country: United Kingdom
- First award: 1831; 195 years ago
- Website: www.geolsoc.org.uk

Precedence
- Next (higher): None
- Next (lower): Lyell Medal

The Wollaston Medal is a scientific award for geology and the highest award granted by the Geological Society of London, the oldest geological society in the world. It is considered to be the most prestigious award in geology, and is given for outstanding contributions to geoscience. The medal is named after English chemist William Hyde Wollaston, and was first awarded in 1831.

The Wollaston Medal was originally made of gold (1831–1845), and then palladium, which was the metal discovered by Wollaston (1846–1860). It was switched to gold again from 1861 to 1929, and then back to palladium from 1930 to present.

== Laureates ==
Source:Geological Society

=== 1831–1850 ===
- 1831 William 'Strata' Smith
- 1835 Gideon Mantell
- 1836 Louis Agassiz
- 1837 Proby Thomas Cautley
- 1837 Hugh Falconer
- 1838 Richard Owen
- 1839 Christian Gottfried Ehrenberg
- 1840 André Hubert Dumont
- 1841 Adolphe-Théodore Brongniart
- 1842 Leopold von Buch
- 1843 Jean-Baptiste Élie de Beaumont
- 1843 Pierre Armand Dufrenoy
- 1844 William Conybeare
- 1845 John Phillips
- 1846 William Lonsdale
- 1847 Ami Boué
- 1848 William Buckland
- 1849 Joseph Prestwich
- 1850 William Hopkins

=== 1851–1900 ===
- 1851 Adam Sedgwick
- 1852 William Henry Fitton
- 1853 Adolphe d'Archiac
- 1853 Édouard de Verneuil
- 1854 Richard John Griffith
- 1855 Henry De la Beche
- 1856 William Edmond Logan
- 1857 Joachim Barrande
- 1858 Hermann von Meyer
- 1859 Charles Darwin
- 1860 Searles Valentine Wood
- 1861 Heinrich Georg Bronn
- 1862 Robert Alfred Cloyne Godwin-Austen
- 1863 Gustav Bischof
- 1864 Roderick Murchison
- 1865 Thomas Davidson
- 1866 Charles Lyell
- 1867 George Poulett Scrope
- 1868 Carl Friedrich Naumann
- 1869 Henry Clifton Sorby
- 1870 Gérard Paul Deshayes
- 1871 Andrew Ramsay
- 1872 James Dwight Dana
- 1873 Philip de Malpas Grey Egerton
- 1874 Oswald Heer
- 1875 Laurent-Guillaume de Koninck
- 1876 Thomas Henry Huxley
- 1877 Robert Mallet
- 1878 Thomas Wright
- 1879 Bernhard Studer
- 1880 Auguste Daubrée
- 1881 Peter Martin Duncan
- 1882 Franz Ritter von Hauer
- 1883 William Thomas Blanford
- 1884 Albert Jean Gaudry
- 1885 George Busk
- 1886 Alfred Des Cloizeaux
- 1887 John Whitaker Hulke
- 1888 Henry Benedict Medlicott
- 1889 Thomas George Bonney
- 1890 William Crawford Williamson
- 1891 John Wesley Judd
- 1892 Ferdinand von Richthofen
- 1893 Nevil Story Maskelyne
- 1894 Karl Alfred von Zittel
- 1895 Archibald Geikie
- 1896 Eduard Suess
- 1897 Wilfred Hudleston Hudleston
- 1898 Ferdinand Zirkel
- 1899 Charles Lapworth
- 1900 Grove Karl Gilbert

=== 1901–1950 ===
- 1901 Charles Barrois
- 1902 Friedrich Schmidt
- 1903 Heinrich Rosenbusch
- 1904 Albert Heim
- 1905 Jethro Teall
- 1906 Henry Woodward
- 1907 William Johnson Sollas
- 1908 Paul Heinrich von Groth
- 1909 Horace Bolingbroke Woodward
- 1910 William Berryman Scott
- 1911 Waldemar Christofer Brøgger
- 1912 Lazarus Fletcher
- 1913 Osmond Fisher
- 1914 John Edward Marr
- 1915 Edgeworth David
- 1916 Alexander Karpinsky
- 1917 Alfred Lacroix
- 1918 Charles Doolittle Walcott
- 1919 Aubrey Strahan
- 1920 Gerard De Geer
- 1921 Ben Peach
- 1921 John Horne
- 1922 Alfred Harker
- 1923 William Whitaker
- 1924 Arthur Smith Woodward
- 1925 George William Lamplugh
- 1926 Henry Fairfield Osborn
- 1927 William Whitehead Watts
- 1928 Dukinfield Henry Scott
- 1929 Friedrich Johann Karl Becke
- 1930 Albert Seward
- 1931 Arthur William Rogers
- 1932 Johan Herman Lie Vogt
- 1933 Marcellin Boule
- 1934 Henry Alexander Miers
- 1935 John Flett
- 1936 Gustaaf Adolf Frederik Molengraaff
- 1937 Waldemar Lindgren
- 1938 Maurice Lugeon
- 1939 Frank Dawson Adams
- 1940 Henry Woods
- 1941 Arthur Louis Day
- 1942 Reginald Aldworth Daly
- 1943 Alexander Fersman
- 1944 Victor Goldschmidt
- 1945 Owen Thomas Jones
- 1946 Emmanuel de Margerie
- 1947 Joseph Tyrrell
- 1948 Edward Battersby Bailey
- 1949 Robert Broom
- 1950 Norman L. Bowen

=== 1951–2000 ===
- 1951 Olaf Holtedahl
- 1952 Herbert Harold Read
- 1953 Erik Stensiö
- 1954 Leonard Johnston Wills
- 1955 Arthur Elijah Trueman
- 1956 Arthur Holmes
- 1957 Paul Fourmarier
- 1958 Pentti Eskola
- 1959 Pierre Pruvost
- 1960 Cecil Edgar Tilley
- 1961 Roman Kozłowski
- 1962 Leonard Hawkes
- 1963 Felix Andries Vening Meinesz
- 1964 Harold Jeffreys
- 1965 D. M. S. Watson
- 1966 Francis Parker Shepard
- 1967 Edward Crisp Bullard
- 1968 Raymond Cecil Moore
- 1969 William Maurice Ewing
- 1970 Philip Henry Kuenen
- 1971 Ralph Alger Bagnold
- 1972 Hans Ramberg
- 1973 Alfred Sherwood Romer
- 1974 Francis J. Pettijohn
- 1975 Hollis Dow Hedberg
- 1976 Kingsley Charles Dunham
- 1977 Reinout Willem van Bemmelen
- 1978 John Tuzo Wilson
- 1979 Hatton Schuyler Yoder
- 1980 Augusto Gansser
- 1981 Robert Minard Garrels
- 1982 Peter John Wyllie
- 1983 Dan Peter McKenzie
- 1984 Kenneth J. Hsu
- 1985 Gerald Joseph Wasserburg
- 1986 John G. Ramsay
- 1987 Claude Jean Allègre
- 1988 Alfred Ringwood
- 1989 Drummond Hoyle Matthews
- 1990 Wallace S. Broecker
- 1991 Xavier Le Pichon
- 1992 Martin Harold Phillips Bott
- 1993 Samuel Epstein
- 1994 William Jason Morgan
- 1995 George P. L. Walker
- 1996 Nicholas John Shackleton
- 1997 Douglas James Shearman
- 1998 Karl Karekin Turekian
- 1999 John Frederick Dewey
- 2000 William Sefton Fyfe

=== 2001– ===
- 2001 Harry Blackmore Whittington
- 2002 Rudolf Trümpy
- 2003 Ikuo Kushiro
- 2004 Geoffrey Eglinton
- 2005 Ted Irving
- 2006 James Lovelock
- 2007 Andrew Knoll
- 2008 Norman Sleep
- 2009 Paul F. Hoffman
- 2010 Richard H. Sibson
- 2011 Robert Stephen John Sparks
- 2012 Christopher Hawkesworth
- 2013 Kurt Lambeck
- 2014 Maureen Raymo - first woman to receive the Wollaston Medal
- 2015 James A. Jackson
- 2016 Susan L. Brantley
- 2017 Richard Alley
- 2018 Terry Plank
- 2019 Edward Stolper
- 2020 Barbara Romanowicz
- 2021 David D. Pollard
- 2022 Tanya Atwater
- 2023 Kathryn Whaler
- 2024 Trond Helge Torsvik
- 2025 Barbara Sherwood Lollar

== See also ==
- List of geology awards
- List of awards named after people
- Geology of Great Britain
