= William Lonsdale =

19th-century English geologist

- Born: 9 September 1794; Bath
- Died: 11 November 1871 (aged 77); Bristol
- Known for: Devonian system
- Awards: Wollaston Medal (1846)
- Scientific career
- Fields: Geology

William Lonsdale (9 September 1794 in Bath – 11 November 1871 in Bristol), English geologist and palaeontologist, won the Wollaston medal in 1846 for his research on the various kinds of fossil corals.

== Biography ==
He was educated for the army and in 1810 obtained a commission as ensign in the 4th (King's Own) regiment. He served in the Peninsular War at the battles of Salamanca and Waterloo, for both of which he received medals; and he retired as lieutenant.

Residing afterwards for some years at Batheaston he collected a series of rocks and fossils which he presented to the Literary and Scientific Institution of Bath. He became the first honorary curator of the natural history department of the museum, and worked until 1829 when he was appointed assistant secretary and curator of the Geological Society of London at Somerset House. There he held office until 1842, when ill health led him to resign.

The ability with which he edited the publications of the society and advised the council on every obscure and difficult point was commented on by Murchison in his presidential address (1843). In 1829 Lonsdale read before the society an important paper On the Oolitic District of Bath (Trans. Geol. Soc. ser. 2, vol. iii.), the results of a survey begun in 1827; later he was engaged in a survey of the Oolitic strata of Gloucestershire (1832), at the instigation of the Geological Society, and he laid down on the one-inch ordnance maps the boundaries of the various geological formations.

He gave particular attention to the study of corals, becoming the highest authority in England on the subject, and he described fossil forms from the Tertiary and Cretaceous strata of North America and from the older strata of Britain and Russia. In 1837 he suggested from a study of the fossils of the South Devon limestones that they would prove to be of an age intermediate between the Carboniferous and Silurian systems. This suggestion was adopted by Sedgwick and Murchison in 1839, and may be regarded as the basis on which they founded the Devonian system.

Lonsdale's paper, Notes on the Age of the Limestones of South Devonshire (read 1840), was published in the same volume of the Transactions of the Geological Society (ser. 2, vol. v.) with Sedgwick and Murchison's famous paper On the Physical Structure of Devonshire, and these authors observe that the conclusion arrived at by Mr Lonsdale, we now apply without reserve both to the five groups of our North Devon section, and to the fossiliferous slates of Cornwall. The later years of Lonsdale's life were spent in retirement, and he died at Bristol on 11 November 1871.
