= Christian Leopold von Buch =

German geologist (1774–1853)

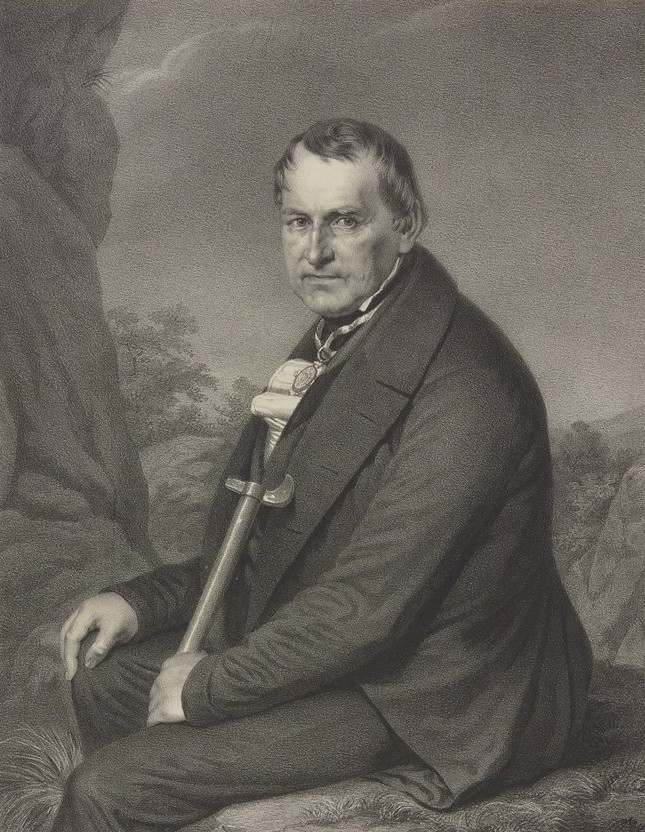
- Christian Leopold von Buch, by Carl Joseph Begas (1850)
- Born: 26 April 1774; Stolpe an der Oder, Margraviate of Brandenburg, Prussia (now a part of Angermünde, Germany)
- Died: 4 March 1853 (aged 78); Berlin, Province of Brandenburg, Prussia
- Known for: Jurassic System; Andesite; Magma mixing Elevation crater theory
- Awards: Wollaston Medal (1842)
- Scientific career
- Fields: Geology

Christian Leopold von Buch (26 April 1774 – 4 March 1853), usually cited as Leopold von Buch, was a German geologist and paleontologist born in Stolpe an der Oder (now a part of Angermünde, Brandenburg) and is remembered as one of the most important contributors to geology in the first half of the nineteenth century. His scientific interest was devoted to a broad spectrum of geological topics: volcanism, petrology, fossils, stratigraphy and mountain formation. His most remembered accomplishment is the scientific definition of the Jurassic system.

== Biography ==
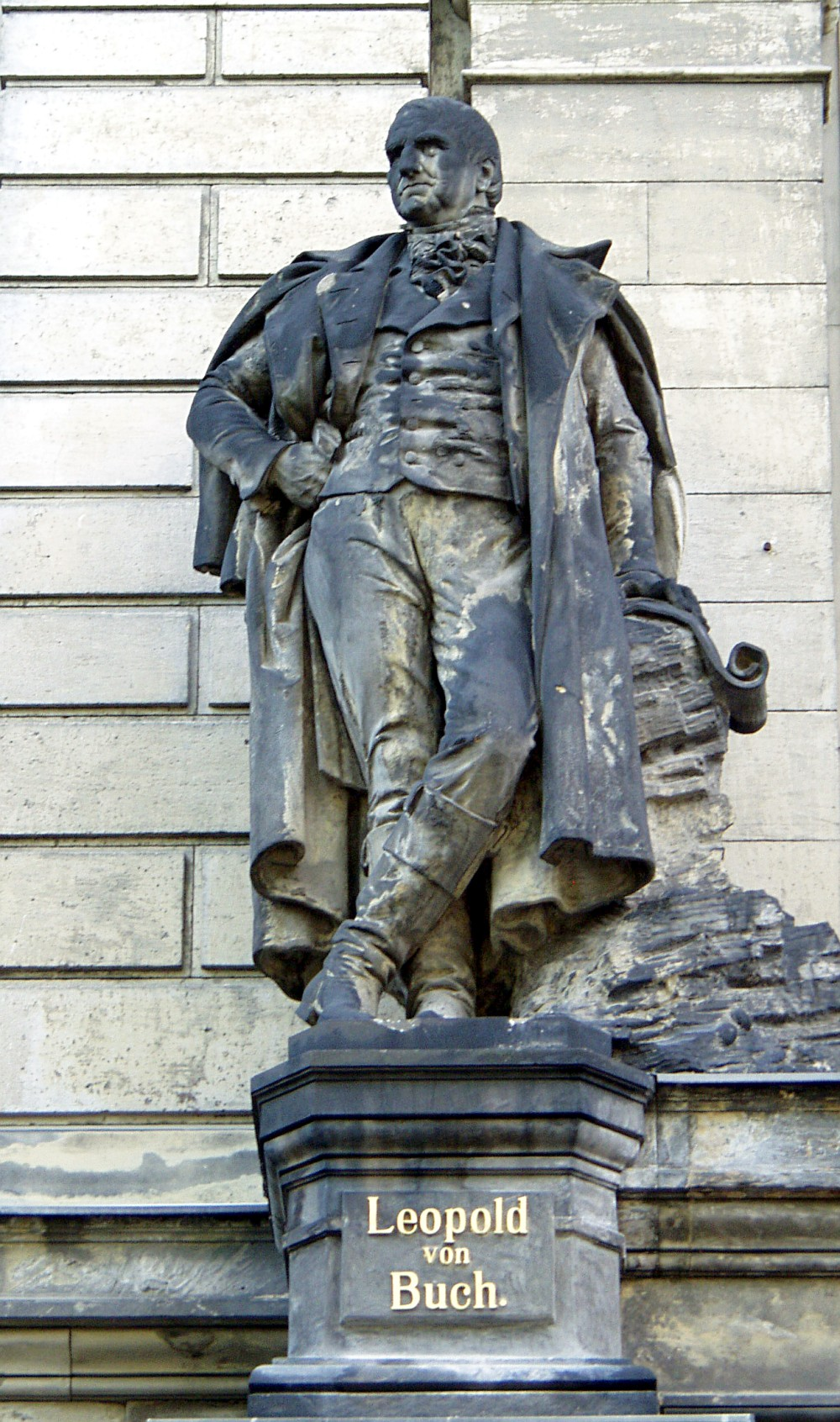
Statue of Leopold von Buch in Berlin, sculpted by Richard Ohmann

Buch studied with Alexander von Humboldt under Abraham Gottlob Werner at the mining school in Freiberg, Saxony. He afterwards completed his education at the universities of Halle and Göttingen.

=== German and Italian explorations ===
He began writing on geological topics early in life. His Versuch einer mineralogischen Beschreibung von Landeck (Breslau, 1797) was translated into French (Paris, 1805), and into English as Attempt at a Mineralogical Description of Landeck (Edinburgh, 1810). In 1802 he published Entwurf einer geognostischen Beschreibung von Schlesien ("The Geognosy of Silesia"), which became the first volume of his Geognostische Beobachtungen auf Reisen durch Deutschland und Italien ("Geognistic Observations while Travelling through Germany and Italy", see below). He was at this time a zealous upholder of the Neptunian theory of Werner, with some modifications. In 1797, he met Humboldt at Salzburg, and with him explored the geological formations of Styria, and the adjoining Alps. In the spring of 1798, Buch extended his excursions into Italy, where his faith in the Neptunian theory was shaken. In his early works, he had advocated the aqueous origin of basaltic and other formations, but now he saw cause to abandon Werner's theory, and to recognize the volcanic origin of the basalts.

He saw Vesuvius for the first time in 1799. Later, in 1805, he had the opportunity, along with Humboldt and Gay Lussac, of witnessing its actual eruption. It was a remarkable eruption, and supplied Buch with data for refuting many erroneous ideas then entertained regarding volcanoes. In 1802 he examined the extinct volcanoes of Auvergne in the south of France. The aspect of the Puy de Dôme, with its cone of trachyte and its strata of basaltic lava, induced him to abandon as untenable the doctrines of Werner on the formation of these rocks. The results of all these geological travels were given to the world in the two volumes of his Geognostische Beobachtungen (Berlin, 1802 and 1809).

=== Scandinavian explorations ===
In 1806, Buch proceeded to Scandinavia and spent two years in examining its physical constitution. Among other, he studied the Oslo Graben, a map of which is on the cover of his book. This furnished the materials for his work entitled Reise durch Norwegen und Lappland ("Travels in Norway and Lapland", Berlin, 1810). He made many important observations on the geography of plants, on climatology and on geology. He showed that many of the erratic blocks on the North German plains must have come from Scandinavia. He also established the fact that the whole of Sweden is slowly but continuously rising above the level of the sea from Frederikshald (Halden) to Åbo (Turku).

=== Canary Islands and the Atlantic ===
In 1815 Buch visited the Canary Islands in company with Christen Smith, a Norwegian botanist. These volcanic isles furnished the starting point from which Buch commenced a regular course of study on the production and activity of volcanoes. This is attested by his standard work on the subject entitled Physical Description of the Canary Isles (1825). His observations convinced him that these and other islands of the Atlantic owed their existence to volcanic action of the most intense kind, whereas the groups of islands in the South Sea were the remains of a pre-existing continent. During his time in the Canary Islands, he visited the Las Cañadas Caldera on Tenerife and the Caldera de Taburiente on La Palma. When he published his memoirs and observations about his excursion, he introduced the Spanish word "Caldera" (meaning "Bowl") into the geological and scientific vocabulary. After his return from the Canaries he visited the basaltic group of the Hebrides and the coasts of Scotland and Ireland.

Buch's geological excursions, even in countries which he had repeatedly visited before, continued without interruption until a very advanced age: eight months before his death he visited the mountains of Auvergne, and on returning home he read a paper on the Jurassic formation before the Academy of Berlin. Humboldt, who had known him intimately for a period of more than sixty years, called him the greatest geologist of that period. Buch was unmarried and lived aloof from the world, entirely devoted to scientific pursuits. His excursions were always taken on foot, with a staff in his hand, and the large pockets of his overcoat filled with papers and geological instruments.

=== Evolution ===
In the third edition of his On the Origin of Species published in 1861, Charles Darwin added a Historical Sketch giving due credit to naturalists who had preceded him in publishing the opinion that species undergo modification, and that the existing forms of life have descended by true generation from pre-existing forms. According to Darwin:

The celebrated geologist and naturalist, Von Buch, in his excellent 'Description physique des Isles Canaries' (1836, p. 147), clearly expresses his belief that varieties slowly become changed into permanent species, which are no longer capable of intercrossing.

Evolutionary biologist Ernst Mayr has written that Buch was the first naturalist to suggest geographic speciation, in 1825.

== Memberships and honors ==
In 1825, he was elected a foreign member of the Royal Swedish Academy of Sciences. Buch was elected a Foreign Honorary Member of the American Academy of Arts and Sciences in 1849.

Recipient of the Pour le Mérite for Sciences and Arts.

Elected as the first foreign member of the Geological Society of London.

The German Geological Society (DGG) named its Leopold-von-Buch-Plakette after him.

== Works ==
Besides the works already mentioned, paleontology works by von Buch include:

- On the Ammonites (1832)
- On the Terebratulae (1834)
- On the Ceratites (1841)
- On the Cystidae (1845)

Other books include:

- Geological Map of Germany (42 sheets; 1832)
- Über den Jur in Deutschland (1839)

== Sources ==
- Rines, George Edwin, ed. (1920). "Buch, Leopold von" . Encyclopedia Americana.
