= Lake Lapworth =

Possible former lake in England

- Location: Great Britain
- Primary inflows: Severn River, Dee River
- Primary outflows: Severn River
- Basin countries: United Kingdom
- Surface area: Postulated
- Frozen: No
- Settlements: Newport, Shropshire

Lake Lapworth was a postulated glacial lake in Great Britain, believed to have formed during the last ice age when glaciers ended the northern outlet of the Severn. This ran through the Dee (which passes by Chester). At some point or points it ran into glaciers and backed up to form a resultant lake. This overflowed southwards cutting the Ironbridge Gorge, near Telford in Shropshire. This permanently diverted most of the Severn drainage basin to its current basin which flows south.

== Etymology ==
The lake was named in 1924 by Leonard Johnston Wills for the late Charles Lapworth (d. 1920), who suggested its existence in 1898. Frederic William Harmer (1835-1923) proposed the same causation and timing in 1907 having considered glacial lake sediments found on the Shropshire Plain.

== Geography and geology ==
Lake Lapworth is one of several glacial lakes that are thought to have existed during the Ice Age in the late Pleistocene. This was the geological epoch that lasted from about 2,580,000 to 11,700 years ago, spanning the world's most recent period of repeated glaciations. Aqualate Mere is a remnant of Lake Lapworth.

The flood that carved Ironbridge gorge exposed deposits of coal, iron, fireclay and limestone. The existence of these minerals and ore in close proximity contributed to the development of the ironworks that started the Industrial Revolution in the 18th century.

The market town of Newport, Shropshire, sits atop a sandstone ridge, which in the last ice age was an island or peninsula in Lake Lapworth. Long after the supposed lake had vanished, early man fished here, and two log boats were uncovered one mile (1.6 km) from Newport. One has been preserved and is now at Harper Adams University at Edgmond in Shropshire.

== Re-evaluation ==
Wills' theory was widely accepted until the 1980s but research starting in the 1970s had shown the existence of a bedrock trench, up to 120m in depth, beneath the course of the Severn running east from the Melverley area beneath Shrewsbury to the head of the Ironbridge Gorge. It is but one of several such buried trenches known beneath the surface of Shropshire and Cheshire whose form indicates erosion by sub-glacial meltwater under considerable pressure, the long profile of this and others being undulating, i.e. with water flowing uphill in certain sections. It is postulated that this sub-glacial version of the Severn rose to the surface at the ice front and cut the gorge; no lake is required in this scenario. The process may have been initiated during the Anglian glaciation of 450,000 years ago and continued during the Devensian. Other work on features interpreted as the shoreline of Lake Lapworth has revealed that the levels do not match from one area to another leaving open the possibility of multiple smaller lakes having existed at different times, rather than one large one.
