= Ethel Skeat =

English stratigrapher, invertebrate paleontologist, and geologist

Ethel Gertrude Skeat
- Born: 14 May 1865; England
- Died: 26 January 1939 (aged 73); Meldreth, England
- Other name: Ethel Woods
- Education: Newnham College
- Known for: Jurassic glacial deposits in Denmark and on Lower Paleozoic rocks in Wales
- Spouse: Henry Woods (m. 1910)
- Awards: Murchison Fund (1908)
- Scientific career
- Fields: Stratigraphy; Paleontology; Geology

Ethel Gertrude Skeat (1865–1939), also known by her married name of Ethel Woods, was an English stratigrapher, invertebrate paleontologist, and geologist who became known for her work on Jurassic glacial deposits in Denmark and on Lower Paleozoic rocks in Wales. She and her chief collaborator, Margaret Crosfield, are credited with undertaking research that substantially advanced understanding of the geological history of northeast Wales. She wrote several books on geology.

== Biography ==
=== Early life ===
Ethel Gertrude Skeat was born on 14 May 1865, one of five children of Bertha (Jones) Skeat and Walter William Skeat, a professor of Anglo-Saxon at Cambridge University. Her brother Walter was an anthropologist.

=== Education and career ===
Woods was privately educated until the age of 25, when she entered Newnham College, Cambridge. There she met both her future collaborator Margaret Crosfield and her future husband, the geologist Henry Woods, whom she married in 1910.

While still a student, she joined the Geologists' Union. She became a fellow of the Geological Society of London in 1919, as soon as it opened to women. In 1894 she became the Arthur Hugh Clough Scholar and completed part one of the Natural Science Tripos Certificate with a Class I.

From 1895 to 1897, she held a Bathurst research scholarship, which was awarded for proficiency in natural sciences. She used the scholarship to travel to Munich, Germany, where she became the first woman to study under paleontologist Karl Alfred von Zittel. During her time abroad, she worked on the paleontology of glacial boulders from the Jurassic era in Denmark. She subsequently became an Associate of Newnham College.

In 1905 she was awarded a Doctor of Science (D.Sc.) degree by Trinity College Dublin in recognition of her contributions to geological research.

For over a decade (1898–1910), she taught sciences in various secondary schools, first in Penwarth (Wales) and then in Chester, England. In 1911 she became a lecturer at the Cambridge Training Institute for Women; she stayed two years initially but returned after World War I for another two decades. During the war itself, thanks to her knowledge of German, she worked for the Post Office in the censorship department.

== Geological contributions ==
While still at Newnham, she collaborated with Crosfield on her first published paper, on Welsh stratigraphy in the area of Carmarthen (1896). She later published two papers (1898, 1904) on Jurassic and Cretaceous boulders in Denmark and east Greenland, the first of which she coauthored with Danish geologist Victor Madsen.

In 1908 she became the first English woman to win the Murchison Fund offered by the Geological Society of London, as a mark of appreciation for her geological work in Denmark and Wales.

In 1925 she collaborated again with Crosfield on a paper about the Silurian stratigraphy of the Clwydian Range in northeast Wales.

In the later part of her career, she wrote several books on geology, including Principles of Geology: Physical and Human (1923) and The Baltic Region (1932).

She became ill in mid-1938 and died on 26 January 1939 in Meldreth, England.
