= Charles Lapworth =

English geologist (1842–1920)

Charles Lapworth FRS FGS
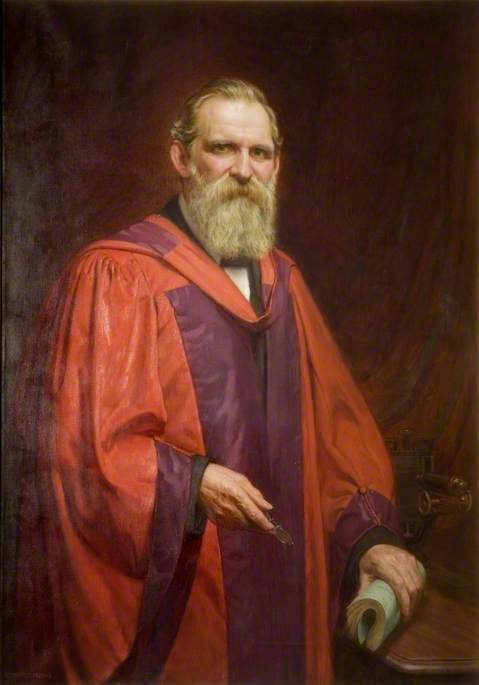
- Born: 20 September 1842; Faringdon, Berkshire, England
- Died: 13 March 1920 (aged 77); Birmingham, England
- Awards: Bigsby Medal (1887); Royal Medal (1891); Wollaston Medal (1899)

Academic work
- Institutions: Episcopal Church School, Galashiels; Madras College; Mason Science College
- Notable students: Gertrude Elles

Charles Lapworth (20 September 1842 – 13 March 1920) was a headteacher and an English geologist who pioneered faunal analysis using index fossils and identified the Ordovician period.

== Biography ==
Charles Lapworth was born in Faringdon in Berkshire (now Oxfordshire) the son of James Lapworth.

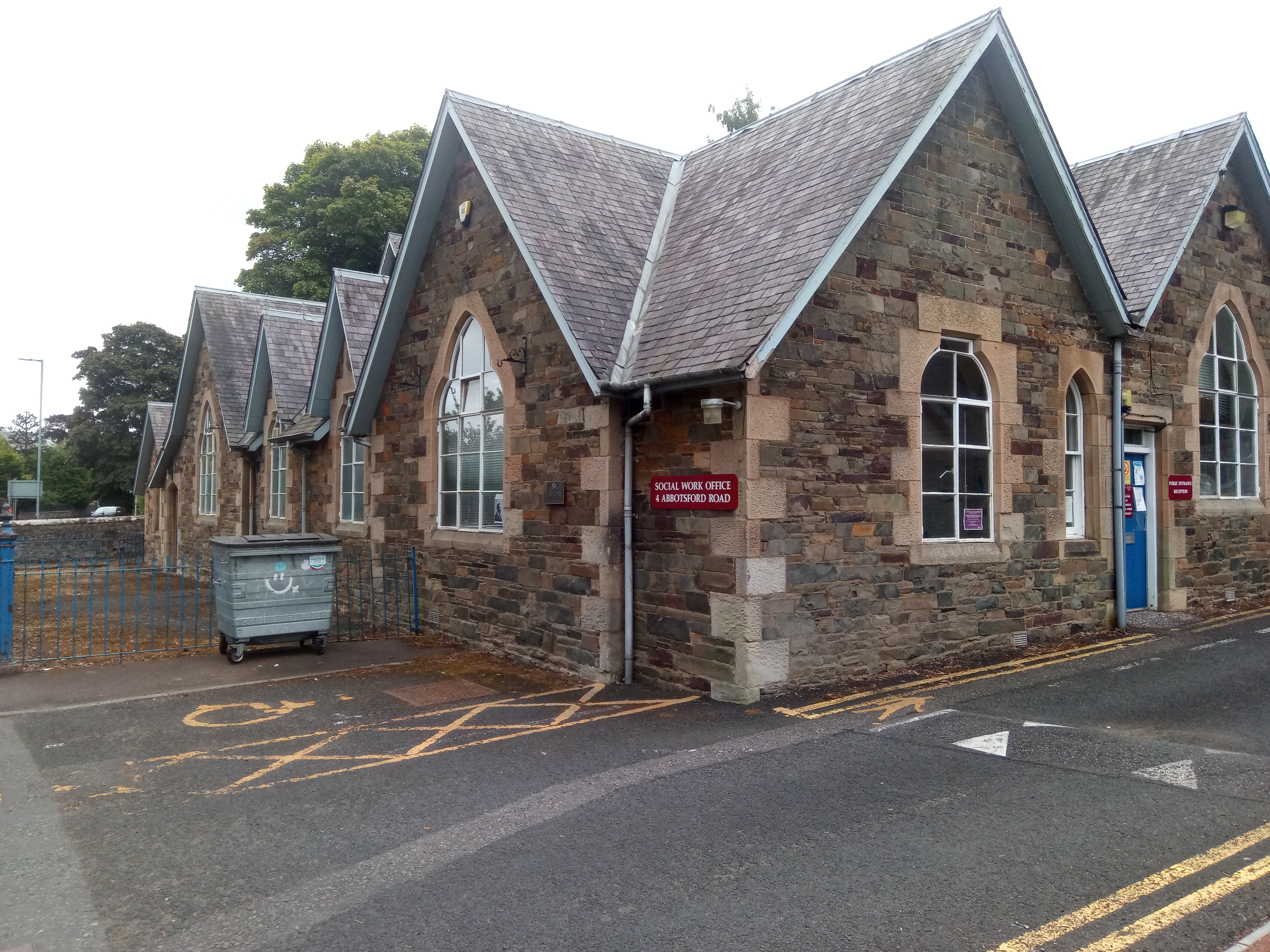
His school in Galashiels, seen in 2021

He trained as a teacher at the Culham Diocesan Training College near Abingdon, Oxfordshire. He moved to the Scottish border region, where he investigated the previously little-known fossil fauna of the area. He was headmaster of the school in Galashiels from 1864 to 1875. In 1869 he married Janet, daughter of Galashiels schoolmaster Walter Sanderson.

Through mapping and innovative use of index fossil analysis, based on a sequence exposed at Dob's Linn, Lapworth showed that what was thought to be a thick sequence of Silurian rocks was in fact a much thinner series of rocks repeated by faulting and folding.

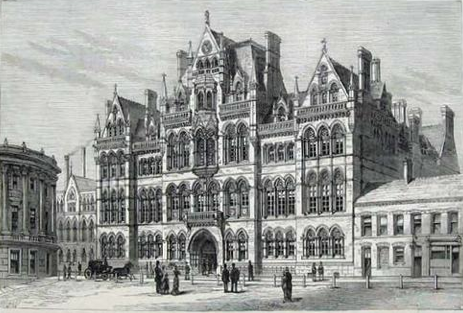
Mason Science College, now the University of Birmingham

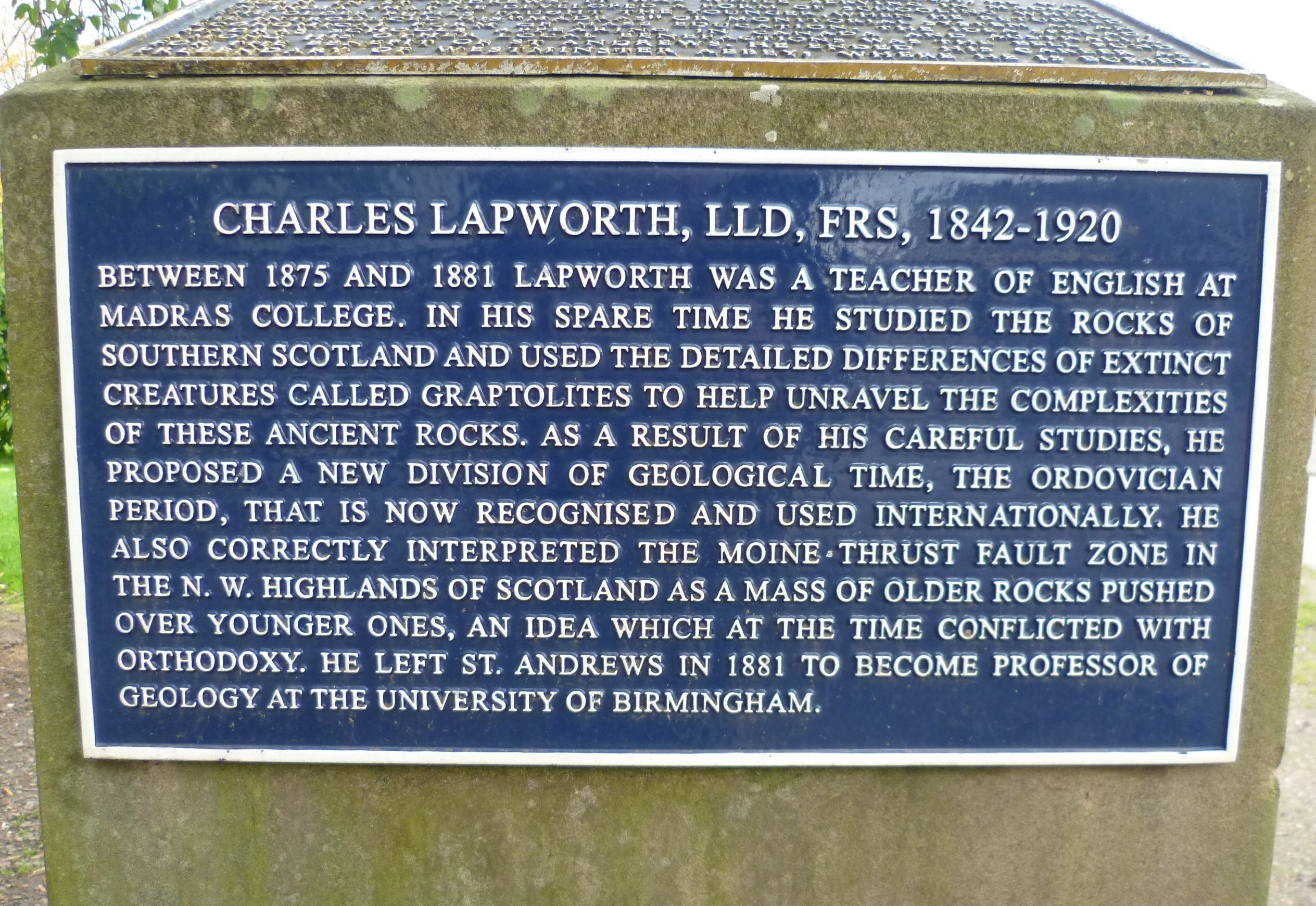
Madras College plaque

He completed this pioneering research in the Southern Uplands while employed as a schoolmaster for 11 years at the Episcopal Church school, Galashiels. He then studied geology and became in 1875 an assistant at Madras College in St Andrews, Fife, and then in 1881 the first professor of geology at Mason Science College, later the University of Birmingham, where he taught until his retirement in 1913.

He is best known for pioneering faunal analysis of Silurian beds by means of index fossils, especially graptolites, and his proposal (eventually adopted) that the beds between the Cambrian beds of north Wales and the Silurian beds of South Wales should be assigned to a new geological period: the Ordovician. He resolved the long running "Highlands Controversy. Lapworth received numerous awards for his research work, while for teaching he used the English Midlands as a setting for demonstrating the fieldwork techniques he had pioneered in his own research.

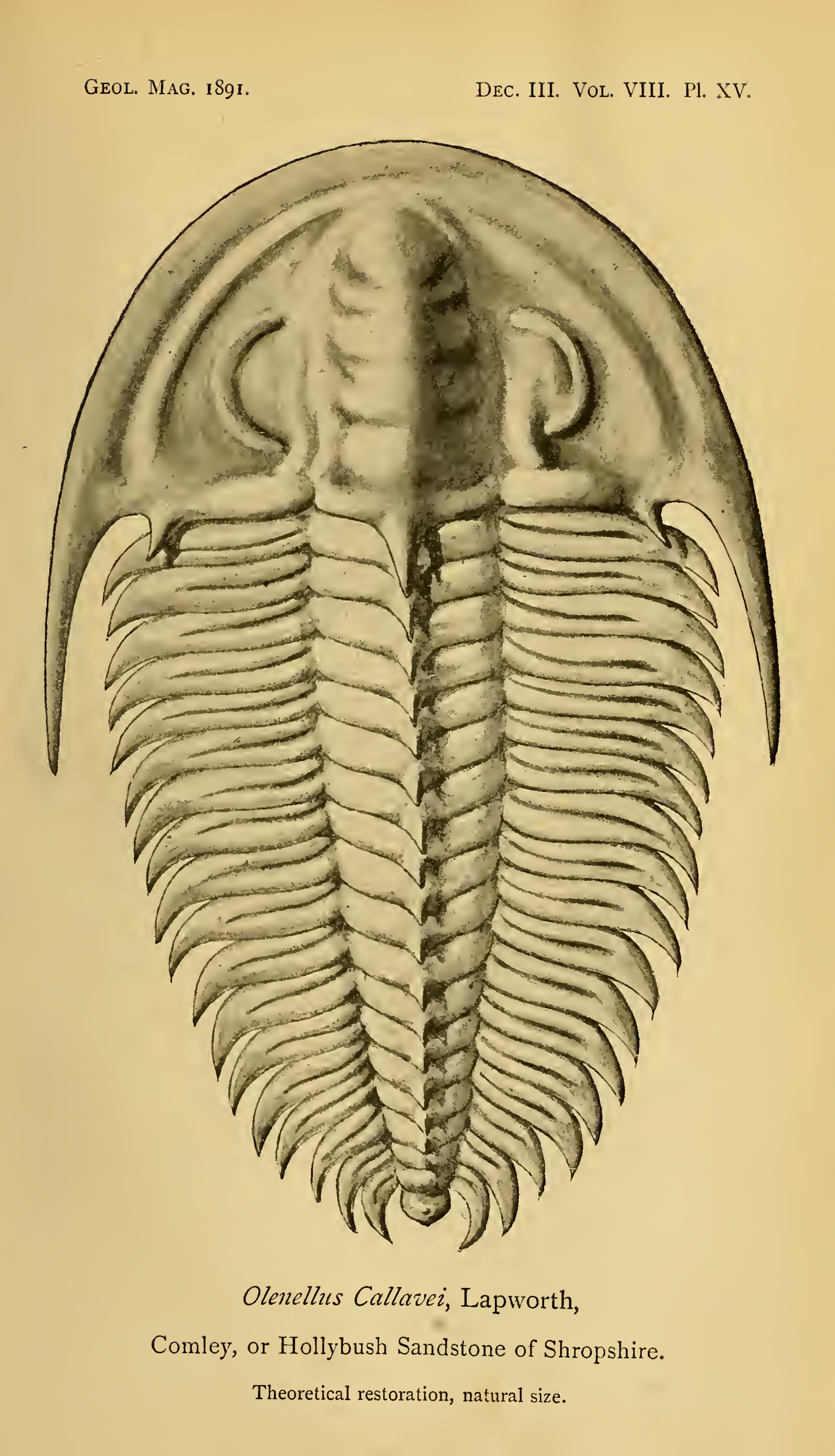
Olenellus callavei (now Callavonia callavei), from Lapworth (1891)

Following his researches in the Southern Uplands Charles Lapworth also devoted time to mapping near Durness in Scotland's northwest highlands and was first to propose the controversial theory that here older rocks were found lying above younger, suggesting complex folding or faulting as a cause. Later Peach and Horne were dispatched to the area and their monumental memoir proved Lapworth correct. In the English Midlands he carried out important work in Shropshire, in particular identifying fossils of Olenelloid trilobites of Cambrian age, demonstrating that Cambrian rocks underlay the Carboniferous rocks between Nuneaton and Atherstone, and suggesting a pre-Cambrian date for the Longmyndian rocks that underlay them. He extrapolated these findings to the N.W. Highlands of Scotland, suggesting that the Torridonian sandstone might correspond to the Longmyndian rocks, and thus be pre-Cambrian rather than Cambrian, and that the Durness-Eriboll series, overlaying the Torridonian, would be of Cambrian age rather than Silurian. Again Peach and Horne, surveying in Dundonnell Forest, confirmed Lapworths's suggestion, finding Olenelloid fossils in the fucoid beds of the Durness-Eriboll series. For a modern account and discussion of the elucidation of the geology of the N.W. Highlands, see Oldroyd (1990).

He died on 13 March 1920 in Birmingham and is buried in Lodge Hill Cemetery, Birmingham.

== Family ==
He married Janet Sanderson in 1869.

The couple had five children in total. The first and last born children died during infancy; Ernest, born 22 January 1871 and died 6 February 1871, and Walter Sanderson Lapworth, born in 1882 and died in 1884 before his second birthday. The children who survived to adulthood were Arthur (born c. 1873), Herbert (born c. 1876), and Edith Matilda (born c. 1879). Arthur Lapworth became a renowned chemist and Herbert a civil engineer, engineering geologist, stratigrapher and palaeontologist.

== Honours and awards ==
Lapworth received many awards for his work and contributions to geology. In June 1888 he was elected a Fellow of the Royal Society and in 1891 was awarded their Royal Medal. In 1899, he received the highest award of the Geological Society of London, the Wollaston Medal, in recognition of his outstanding work in the Southern Uplands, and Northwest Highlands of Scotland. There years later, in February 1902, he was elected President of the Geological Society for the years 1902–1904.

The fossil species Fritzolenellus lapworthi was named (as Olenellus lapworthi) in his honour by Ben Peach and John Horne in 1892, when they wrote:

It is named after Prof. Chas. Lapworth, F.R.S., who has done so much towards the elucidation of our older Palæozoic rocks and who was the first to prove the existence of Olenellus in our own country.

The glacial Lake Lapworth, was named for him by Leonard Johnston Wills in recognition of his original suggestion of its existence in 1898.

Aberdeen University awarded him an honorary doctorate in 1884 and Glasgow University in 1912 (both LLD).

In 1916 he was elected an Honorary Fellow of the Royal Society of Edinburgh.

== Lapworth Museum of Geology ==
Papers relating to Charles Lapworth can be found at the University of Birmingham in the Lapworth Museum of Geology, located within the Aston Webb building on the main Edgbaston campus. The Lapworth Archive contains a remarkably complete record of all areas of his research work and teaching. In August 2021 a project funded by ‘Archives Revealed’ began to catalogue and promote Lapworth's archive.
