= Alain Manceau =

French environmental mineralogist and biogeochemist

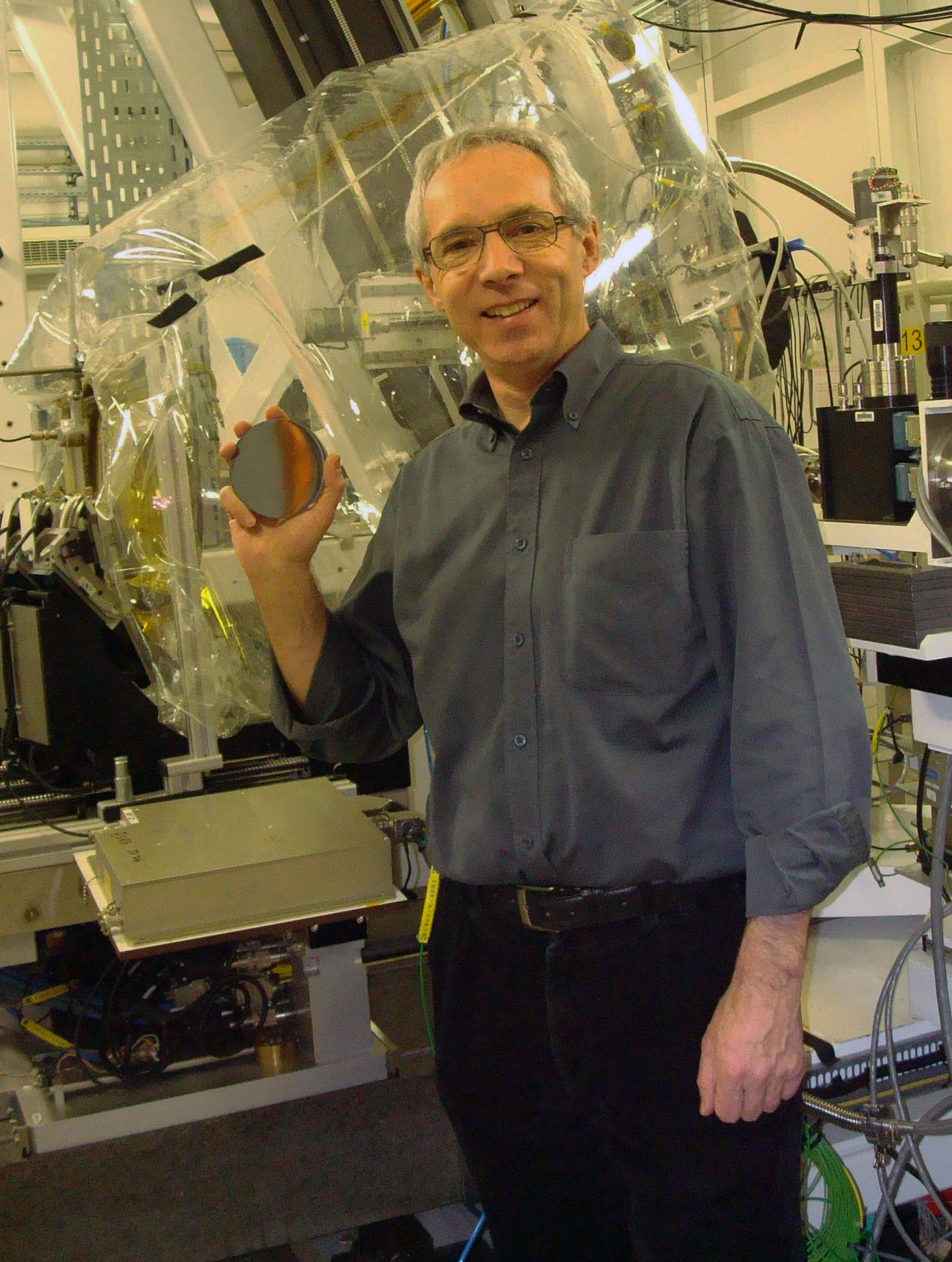
- c. 2015
- Born: September 19, 1955 (age 71); Valmondois, France
- Education: École Normale Supérieure de Saint-Cloud, today ENS-Lyon; University Paris VII, today Université Paris Cité
- Awards: CNRS Bronze Medal; CNRS Silver Medal; ES&T Best Paper Award; Prix Léon Lutaud, Georges Millot medal Académie des sciences (France)
- Scientific career
- Fields: Mineralogy, Biogeochemistry
- Workplaces: French National Centre for Scientific Research (CNRS); IMPMC, Paris; ISTerre, Grenoble; ENS-Lyon, Lyon; ESRF, Grenoble
- Doctoral advisor: Georges Calas
- Website: perso.ens-lyon.fr/alain.manceau/

Alain Manceau, born September 19, 1955, is a French environmental mineralogist and biogeochemist. His research focus is on the structure and reactivity of nanoparticulate iron and manganese oxides and clay minerals, on the crystal chemistry of strategic metals and rare-earth elements, and on the structural biogeochemistry of mercury in natural systems, animals, and humans.

== Biography ==
Manceau is a former student of the Lycée Henri IV in Paris and the École Normale Supérieure de Saint-Cloud (now École Normale Supérieure de Lyon). He obtained the agrégation in natural sciences in 1981, then his doctorate in 1984 at the University Paris VII (now Université Paris Cité) under the direction of George Calas. He spent his entire academic career at the French National Centre for Scientific Research (CNRS), first as a research fellow from 1984, then as a research director from 1993 to 2022. From 1984 to 1992, he worked at the Institut de Minéralogie, de Physique des Matériaux et de Cosmochimie (IMPMC) in Paris, and from 1993 to 2022 at the Institut des Sciences de la Terre (ISTerre) of the Grenoble Alpes University. He was appointed emeritus CNRS Researcher at the ENS-Lyon in 2022, and research scientist at the European Synchrotron Radiation Facility (ESRF) in 2023. In 1997, he was a visiting professor at the University of Illinois Urbana-Champaign, then Adjunct professor until 2001. He was a visiting professor at the University of California, Berkeley from 2001 to 2002.

== Scientific works ==
Environmental mineralogy and geochemistry

Minerals play a key role in the biogeochemical cycling of the elements at the Earth's surface, sequestering and releasing them as they undergo precipitation, crystal growth, and dissolution in response to chemical and biological processes. Manceau's research in this field focuses on the structure of disordered minerals (clays, iron (Fe) and manganese (Mn) oxides, including ferrihydrite and birnessite), on chemical reactions at their surface in contact with aqueous solutions, and on the crystal chemistry of trace metals in these phases.

In 1993, he established in collaboration with Victor Drits a structural model for ferrihydrite based on the modeling of the X-ray diffraction pattern. This model was confirmed in 2002 by Rietveld refinement of the neutron diffraction pattern, and in 2014 by simulation of the pair distribution function measured by high-energy X-ray scattering.

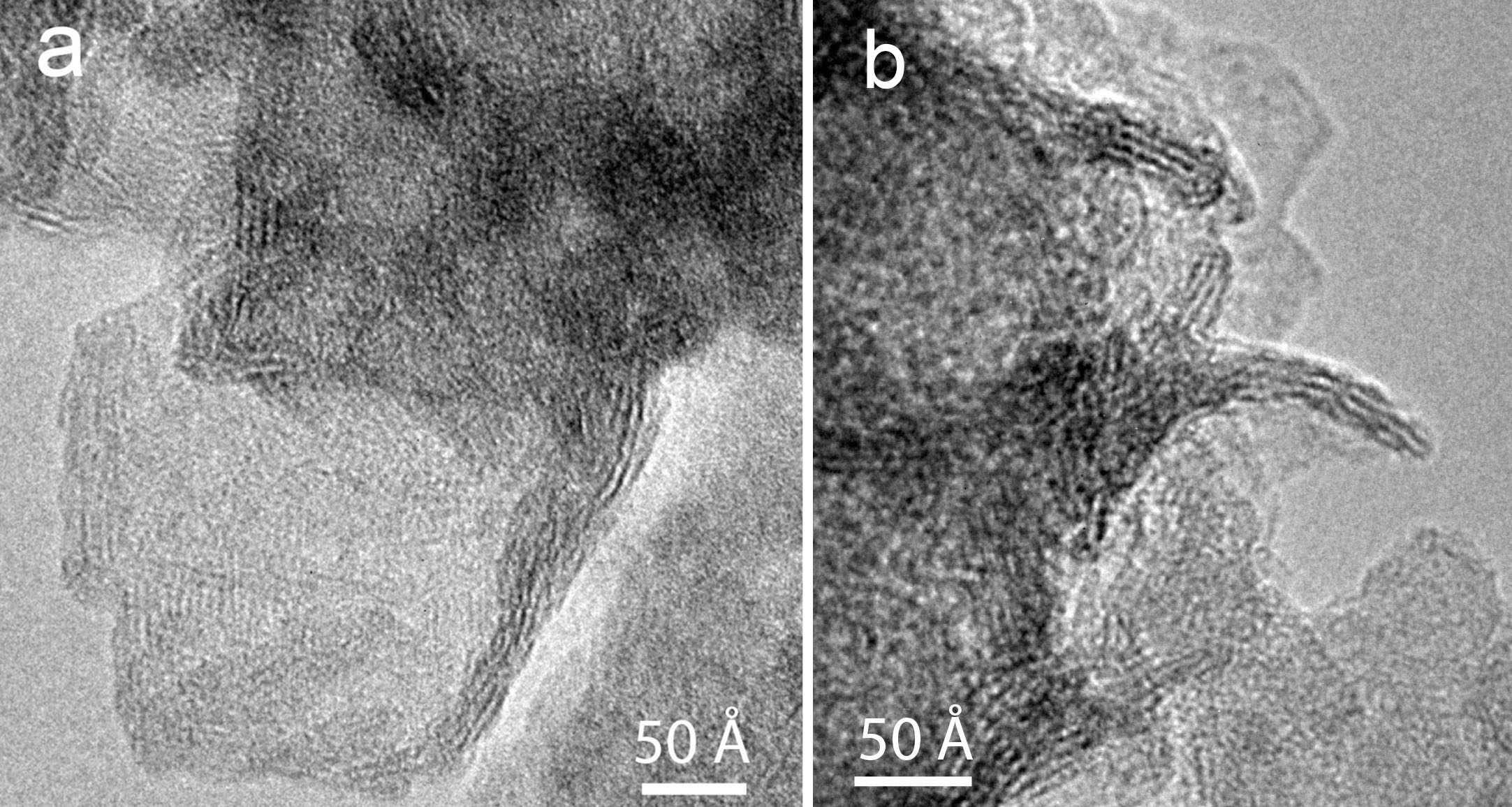
Electron image of δ-MnO_{2} nanoparticles viewed parallel (a) and perpendicular (b) to the layer plane.

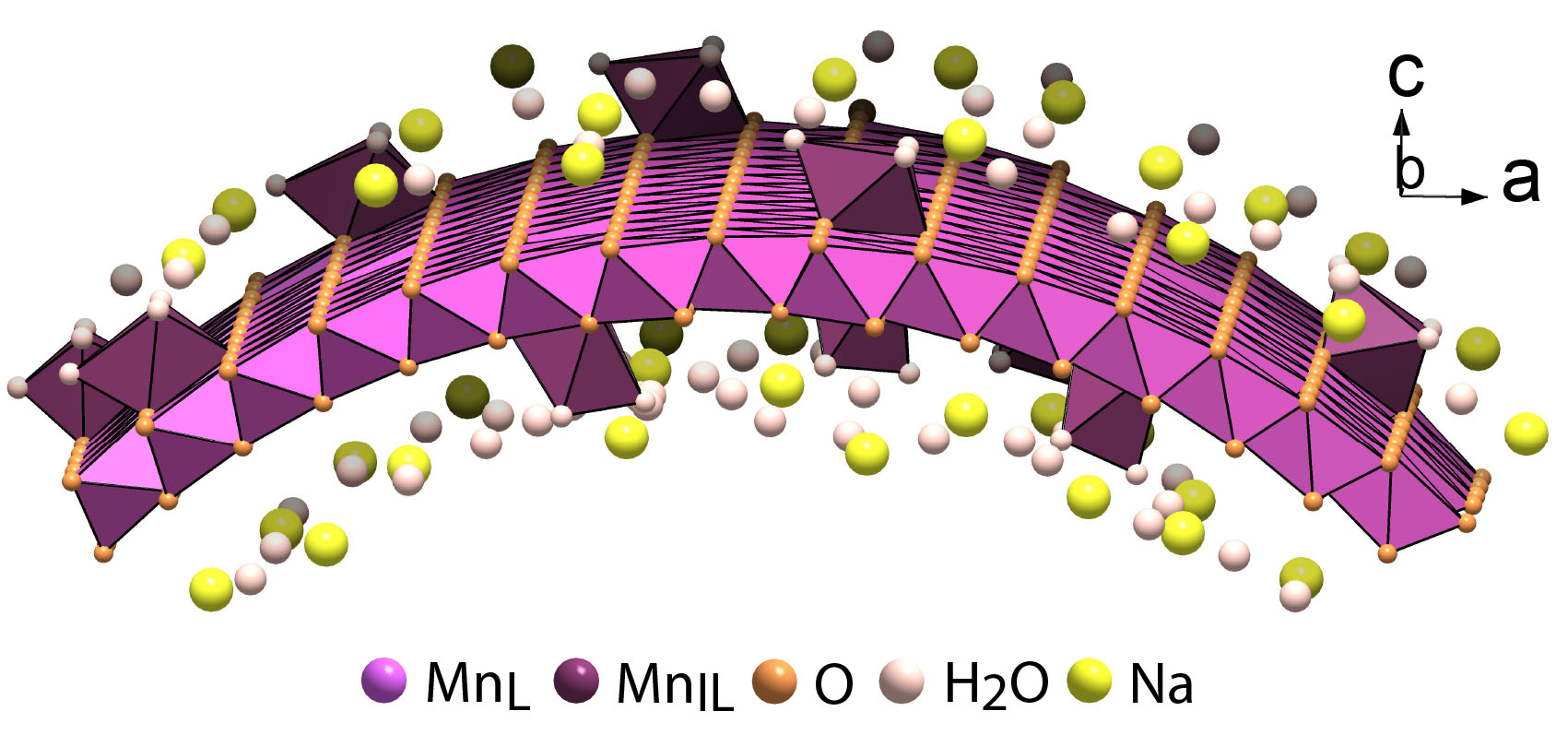
Structure of a cylindrically bent layer of δ-MnO_{2} nanosheet.

In 1997, he and Victor Drits led the synthesis and resolution of the structure of hexagonal and monoclinic birnessite, and they showed in 2002 that the monoclinic form possesses a triclinic distortion. The hexagonal form prevails at the Earth's surface and owes its strong chemical reactivity to the existence of heterovalent Mn^{4+}-Mn^{3+}-Mn^{2+} substitutions and Mn^{4+} vacancies in the MnO_{2} layer. The Mn^{4+}-Mn^{3+} and Mn^{3+}-Mn^{2+} redox couples confer to this material oxidation-reduction properties used in catalysis, electrochemistry, and in the electron transfer during the photo-dissociation of water by photosystem II, while the vacancies are privileged sites for the adsorption of cations. He has characterized and modeled a number of chemical reactions occurring at the birnessite-water interface, including those of complexation of transition metals (Ni, Cu, Zn, Pb, Cd...), and oxidation of As^{3+} to As^{5+}, Co^{2+} to Co^{3+}, and Tl^{+} to Tl^{3+}. The oxidative uptake of cobalt on birnessite leads to its billion-fold enrichment in marine ferromanganese deposits compared to seawater.

From 2002 to 2012, he applied the knowledge base acquired on the crystal chemistry of trace metals and biogeochemical processes at mineral surfaces and the root-soil interface (rhizosphere) to the phytoremediation of contaminated soils and sediments, and abandoned mine sites. He contributed to improving the Jardins Filtrants® (Filtering Gardens) process for treating wastewater and solid matrices by phytolixiviation, phytoextraction, and rhizofiltration developed by the Phytorestore company.

In 2022, he extended his research on the crystal chemistry of trace metals to processes responsible for the 10^{6} to 10^{9} times enrichment of strategic rare-earth elements (REE) and redox-sensitive elements (cerium, thallium, platinum) in marine deposits relative to seawater. REE are associated with fluorapatite in marine sediments, whereas redox metals are oxidatively scavenged by birnessite in manganese nodules and crusts.

Structural biogeochemistry of mercury

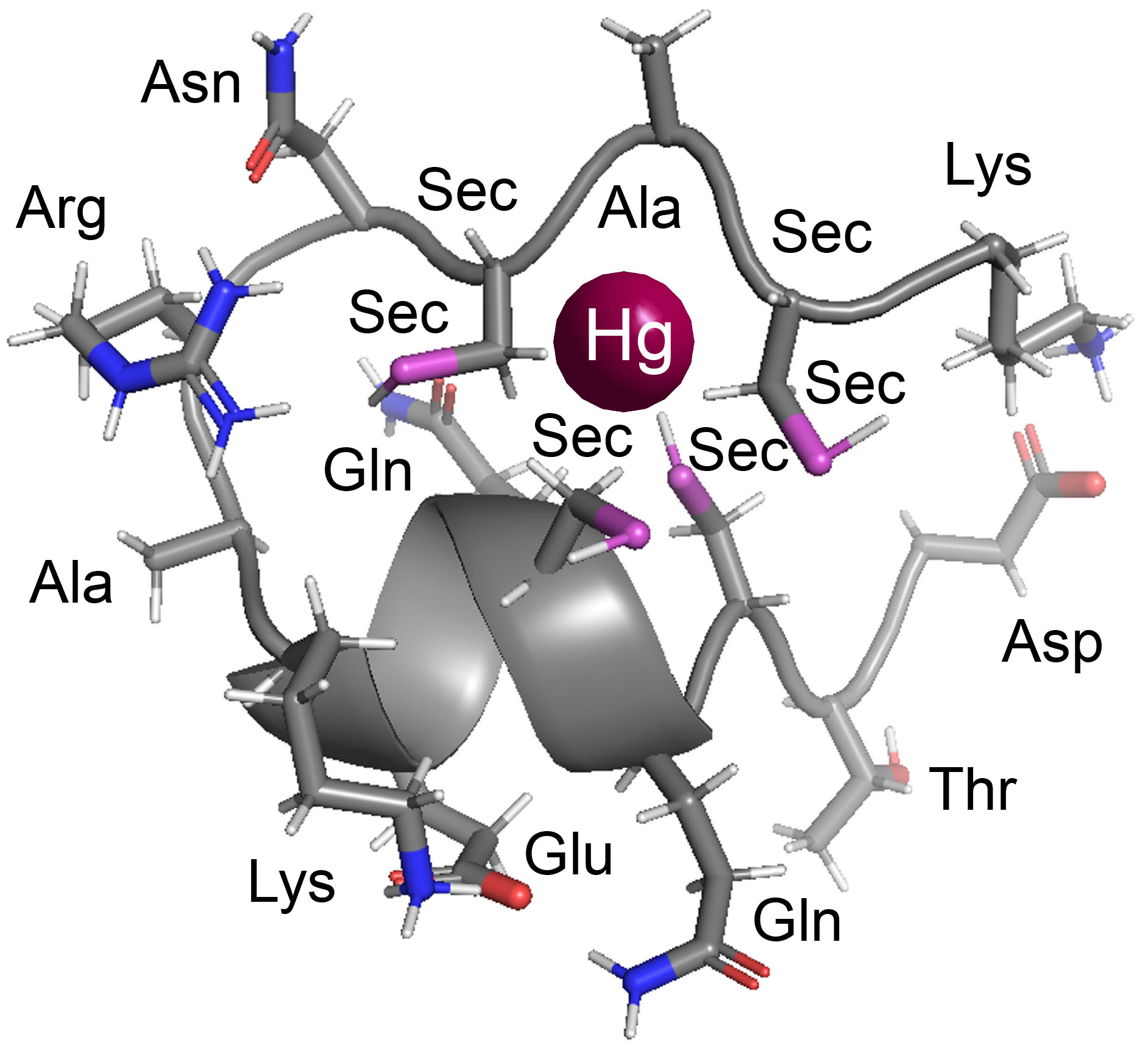
Binding site of mercury (Hg) in selenoprotein P of the grebe bird.

Mercury (Hg) is a global pollutant that is generated both by natural sources, such as volcanic eruptions and wildfires, and human activities, such as coal combustion, gold mining, and the incineration of industrial waste. In aquatic and terrestrial food chains, mercury accumulates as methylmercury (MeHg), a potent toxin that affects the function of animal's and human's brain and reproductive system. Understanding the internal detoxification processes of MeHg in living organisms is essential for protecting wildlife and humans, and designing treatments against mercury poisoning.

In 2015, Manceau led foundational studies on the structural biogeochemistry of mercury in bacteria, plants, animals, and humans using X-ray absorption spectroscopy at the ESRF. In 2021, he found that the Clark's grebe (Aechmophorus clarkii) and the Forster's tern (Sterna forsteri) from California, the southern giant petrel (Macronectes giganteus) and the south polar skua (Stercorarius maccormicki) from the Southern Ocean, the Indo-Pacific blue marlin (Makaira mazera) from French Polynesia, and long-finned pilot whales stranded on the coasts of Scotland and the Faroe Islands, detoxify the organic methylmercury-cysteine complex (MeHgCys) in inorganic mercury-selenocysteine complex (Hg(Sec)_{4}). In 2025, he extended this result to emperor penguins from Antarctica and to Atlantic bluefin tuna.

This body of work shed light on how birds, cetacea, and fishes manage to get rid of methylmercury toxicity. Demethylation of the MeHgCys complex to Hg(Sec)_{4} and very poorly soluble inorganic HgSe is catalyzed by selenoprotein P (SelP) within which nucleate clusters of Hg_{x}(Sec,Se)_{y} that grow, likely by self-assembly of mercurial proteins as is common in biomineralization processes, to form in fine inert, non-toxic mercury selenide (HgSe) crystals.

The new Hg(Sec)_{4} species identified by Manceau and his collaborators was the main "missing intermediate" in the chemical reaction that helps animals to survive high levels of mercury. However, because Hg(Sec)_{4} has a molar ratio of selenium to mercury of 4:1, four selenium atoms are required to detoxify just one mercury atom. Thus, Hg(Sec)_{4} severely depletes the amount of bioavailable selenium. Selenium deficiency can affect the function of animals' brain and reproductive system, as selenoproteins serve critical antioxidant functions in the brain and testes. His works on the Hg-Se antagonism won him the ES&T 2021 Best Paper Award.

The stepwise MeHgCys → Hg(Sec)_{4} + HgSe demethylation reaction is accompanied by the fractionation of the ^{202}Hg and ^{198}Hg isotopes, denoted δ^{202}Hg. The δ^{202}Hg fractionation measured on whole animal tissues (δ^{202}Hg_{t}) is the sum of the fractionations of the MeHgCys, Hg(Sec)_{4}, and HgSe species, weighted by their relative abundance:

δ^{202}Hg_{t} = $\sum$ f(Sp_{i})_{t} × δ^{202}Sp_{i}

where δ^{202}Sp_{i} is the fractionation of each chemical species, and f(Sp_{i}) their relative abundance, or mole fraction. Manceau and his co-authors found that δ^{202}Sp_{i} can be obtained by mathematical inversion of macroscopic isotopic and microscopic spectroscopic data.

The combination of isotopic and spectroscopic data on birds and cetacea revealed that dietary methylmercury and the Hg(Sec)_{4}-SelP complex are distributed to all tissues (liver, kidney, sketetal muscle, brain) via the circulatory system with, however, a hierarchy in the tissular percentage of each species. Most of the detoxification process is carried out in the liver, whereas the brain, which is particularly sensitive to the neurotoxic effects of mercury, is distinguished from other tissues by a low mercury concentration and a high proportion of inert HgSe. These results appear to be transposable to humans.

== Publications ==
Manceau has published more than 200 scientific papers in Science Citation Index journals totalizing more than 24,000 citations and garnering an h-index over 90. In 2020, he was ranked 111th out of a total of 70,197 researchers in Geochemistry/Geophysics in a bibliometric study by scientists of the Stanford University based on the Elsevier Scopus database.

== Awards and honors ==
- 1989, Bronze Medal, French National Centre for Scientific Research (CNRS)
- 2002, Fellow of the Mineralogical Society of America (MSA).
- 2003, Brindley Lecture, The Clay Minerals Society (CMS).
- 2006, George Brown Lecture, Mineralogical Society of Great Britain and Ireland (MinSoc).
- 2010, Silver Medal, French National Centre for Scientific Research (CNRS).
- 2011, EcoX Équipex Grant.
- 2022, Elected member of the Academia Europaea.
- 2022, European Research Council Advanced Grant.
- 2022, ES&T 2021 Best Paper Award.
- 2023, Léon Lutaud Price and Georges Millot Medal, Académie des sciences (France).

== Online conference and research highlight ==
- Phytotechnology in the Present and Future: Remedies for Contaminated Soil and Water
- From Antarctica to California : how birds detoxify mercury
- Methylmercury Detoxification in Wildlife: Novel Insights from HERFD-XANES and Stable Isotopes
