= Marjorie Hooker =

American mineralogist, petrologist (1908–1976)

- Born: 10 May 1908; Flushing, New York
- Died: 4 May 1976 (aged 69); Washington D.C.
- Education: Hunter College; Columbia University; George Washington University
- Occupation: Geologist
- Awards: Alexander Winchell Distinguished Award (Posthumous)

Marjorie Hooker (10 May 1908 – 4 May 1976) was an American geologist who worked to collect data on the make-up of igneous and metamorphic rocks as well as acted as a mineral specialist for the United States Department of State from 1943 to 1947. Her work on deciphering chemical data for granite rocks led her to collect and correspond information with geologists from all around the world. The multiple associations with which she worked include the American Association for the Advancement of Science, the Washington Academy of Sciences, the Geological Society of London, the Mineralogical Society of Great Britain and Ireland, the American Geophysical Union, the Geological Society of America, and the Mineralogical Association of Canada. She also worked as a delegate of the International Geological Congresses for their 19th, 20th, 23rd, and 24th meetings. Her contributions to Geology have been recognized with an award created in her name at Syracuse University to recognize and aid exceptional student research.

== Early life and education ==
Hooker was born in Flushing, New York.

She attended Hunter College in New York City. There, she worked towards a B.A. in the field of Geology which she received in 1929. Hooker went on to Syracuse University to continue her studies and received a M.A. in Geology in 1933. From 1933 to 1937 she continued her graduate studies at Columbia University and George Washington University.

== Research career ==
Hooker spent 30 years writing bibliographies and studying rocks and minerals. Though most of her studies on rocks and minerals were through past data of notable geologists, Hooker was also responsible for compiling geological data from literature from different regions in the world. One of Hooker's most recognized published bibliography was Data of Rock Analyses volumes 1–5. In these volumes she compiles a list of literature from the years 1914–1953 pertaining to the chemical analyses of igneous and metamorphic rocks. Hooker categorizes the literature based on which country they were published in, including the countries of Africa, New Zealand, Iceland, and Australia. Hooker also organized the literature from 1866 to 1968 that prioritized the chemical analysis of igneous and metamorphic rock in the Puerto Rican region. Due to this work 90% of the published igneous and metamorphic rocks found on the Greater and Lesser Antilles are on a magnetic tape in a form retrievable by rock type, location, and other parameters. Hooker could have published more papers but her standards were sometimes too high.

Hooker was also interested in writing about lesser-known histories of the geological field, such as the term Nuée ardente which she put much research into. French geologist Alfred Lacroix coined this term and Hooker published writings on Lacroix's accounts and reports in the early 1900s when studying the Mount Pelée eruptions. This published works was called The Origin of the Volcanological Concept Nuée Ardente.

== Contributions and awards ==
Hooker's notable contribution to the field of scientific bibliography and her devotion in multiple scientific societies is globally-recognized. Through her career as an organizer in Mineralogical Abstracts, she authored sixty-four articles. Her active participation towards improving the development of the geological societies led her to establish and maintain communication with other geologists from around the world. In addition to her participation in a great number of scientific association across the world including Great Britain, Japan, Ireland, Switzerland, Canada and United States, she also served consecutive terms as the representative of the International Geological Congress (19th, 20th, 23rd and 24th terms). Due to her profound contribution to the field of geology, she was honored with the position of secretary of the General Meeting from the 7th term until her death. Following her death in 1976, she was posthumously honored with the Alexander Winchell Distinguished Award from Syracuse University, and to recognize her exceptional contributions to the field of geology, an award was created in her name to recognize outstanding students and aid their research.

== Personal life ==
Hooker's life was highly dedicated to science. The majority of her life and her personal interests were connected to her involvement in scientific societies all around the world. The back room in her home in Silver Spring, Maryland was turned into the office for the Mineralogical Society of America. Hooker had many visitors from around the world, as she would host visitors from foreign countries when they came to America to work on geological affairs. The Montgomery Hills area of Silver Spring was where she worked to assist with local community affairs. One of these community affairs included being a judge for a Science fair. She also played the violin. She brought her violin with her on many different trips to different countries.

Hooker had two sisters, Elsie and Vera, who continued to live in New York after her death.
