= Gerhard Lagaly =

German chemist and professor (born 1938)

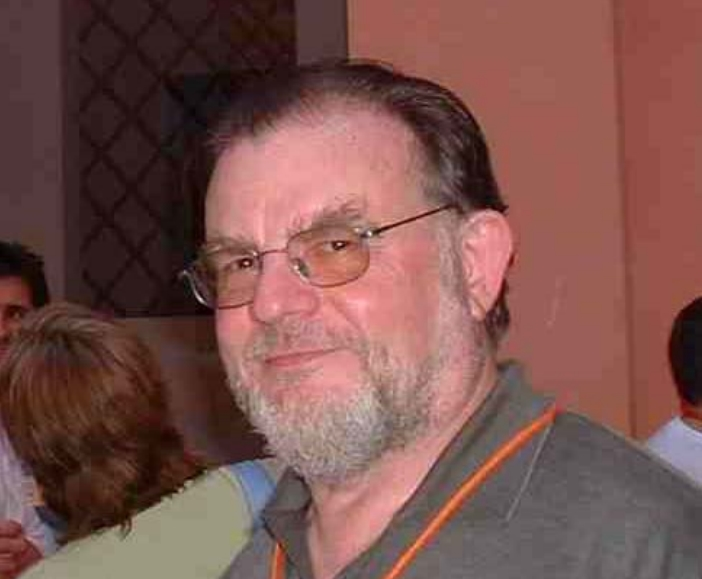
- Lagaly in 2003
- Born: 14 October 1938 (age 87); Ludwigshafen am Rhein, Rheinland-Pfalz, Germany
- Citizenship: German
- Education: Heidelberg University; LMU Munich
- Known for: Alkylammonium Method for layer charge determination
- Awards: AIPEA Medal (2001); Bailey Award (2002); Wolfgang Ostwald Prize (2004)
- Scientific career
- Fields: Clay and Colloid Chemistry
- Workplaces: Kiel University
- Doctoral advisor: Armin Weiss

Gerhard Lagaly (born 14 October 1938, in Ludwigshafen am Rhein) is a German chemist and retired university professor.

== Life and work ==
In 1957, Lagaly started his studies in Chemistry (as well as in Physics, Mineralogy and Botany) at the Heidelberg University, receiving his degree as "Diplom-Chemiker" in 1962. He conducted his doctorate studies at the Institute for Inorganic Chemistry at the same institution under Armin Weiss, and was awarded his Doctor degree in 1967 with the work "Untersuchung von Quellungsvorgängen in n-Alkylammonium-Schichtsilicaten". From 1965, he worked as an assistant at the Institute for Inorganic Chemistry of LMU Munich where he concluded his Habilitation in 1971 and then was employed as lecturer ("Akademischer Rat/Oberrat"). In 1974, he was employed as Professor for Inorganic Chemistry at Kiel University, retiring in 2004.

His research lines concentrated on Clay chemistry, Colloid chemistry and Interface chemistry as well as chemistry from porous compounds, layered materials and intercalation chemistry.

Among his many contributions to the fields of clay and colloid chemistry, one of his most recognized developments was the Alkylammonium Method for the determination of layer charge in layered aluminosilicates.

He acted as treasurer of the German Colloid Society from 1979 to 2003. In 2004 the same institution awarded him with the Wolfgang Ostwald Prize. Lagaly was President of the German Clay Group (DTTG) from 1987 to 1992 and of the European Clay Groups Association (ECGA) from 1999 to 2003.

In addition, Lagaly acted for many years (1987–2004) as editor-in-chief for "Colloid and Polymer Science" and "Progress Colloid and Polymer Science" as well as editor for "Clay Minerals" (1982–1996) and "Applied Clay Science" (1985–1996).

== Awards and distinctions ==
1969 – Richard-Zsigmondy-Stipendium, awarded by the Kolloid-Gesellschaft (Germany)
1995 – George W. Brindley Lecture Award, The Clay Minerals Society (USA)
1996 – Doctor honoris causa, University of Szeged (Hungary)
1999 – Wolfgang-Ostwald-Kolloquium of the Kolloid-Gesellschaft (Germany) dedicated to the 60th birthday of G. Lagaly
2001 – AIPEA Medal in recognition of innovative and dynamic scientific contribution to the field of Clay Sciences
2002 – Marilyn & Sturges W. Bailey Distinguished Member Award, Clay Minerals Society (USA)
2002 – Socio de Honor de la Sociedad Española de Arcillas (Spain)
2004 – Wolfgang-Ostwald-Prize, awarded by the Kolloid-Gesellschaft (Germany)
2005 – Membre d'Honneur du Groupe Français des Argiles (France)
2006 – Ehrenmitglied der DTTG (Germany-Austria-Switzerland)

== The Gerhard Lagaly Award ==
The German Clay Group (DTTG) awards the Gerhard Lagaly Award, to "internationally excellent scientists with outstanding original research in the field of clay mineralogy." The award is designated after the internationally highly recognized clay scientist and the distinguished member of the DTTG, Professor Dr. Dr. Gerhard Lagaly.

The prize was first awarded in 2014 to Prof. Dr. Juraj Bujdák (Comenius University Bratislava). In 2016, the prize went to Dr. habil. Sabine Petit (Université de Poitiers). The recipient of the 2018 prize was Dr. Stephan Kaufhold (BGR Hannover).

== Lagalyite ==
In March 2017 a hydrated calcium phyllomanganate with formula Ca_{2x}Mn_{1−x}O_{2}•1.5-2H_{2}O (x = 0.05–0.08) was accepted as new mineral by the International Mineralogical Association. This new species was discovered and described by Dr. Thomas Witzke and colleagues. It was named Lagalyite, in honor of Gerhad Lagaly and his contributions to the fields of clay chemistry and mineralogy.

== Selected works ==
- Karl Jasmund, Gerhard Lagaly (editors): Tonminerale und Tone. Struktur, Eigenschaften, Anwendungen und Einsatz in Industrie und Umwelt. Steinkopf Verlag, Darmstadt, 1993.
- Gerhard Lagaly, Oliver Schulz, Ralf Zimehl: Dispersionen und Emulsionen: eine Einführung in die Kolloidik feinverteilter Stoffe einschließlich der Tonminerale, Steinkopf Verlag, Darmstadt, 1997.
- Faiza Bergaya, Gergard Lagaly (editors): Handbook of Clay Science. Elsevier, Amsterdam, 2013 (2nd Ed.).

== See also ==
- Interface and colloid science
