= Bailey Distinguished Member Award =

The Marilyn and Sturges W. Bailey Distinguished Member Award, is the highest honor of The Clay Minerals Society, based in Virginia, United States. It is awarded solely for scientific eminence in clay mineralogy (in its broadest sense) as evidenced by the publication of outstanding original scientific research and by the impact of this research on the clay sciences. It is endowed by Linda and David Bailey and replaces The Clay Mineral Society's Distinguished Member Award. It is not restricted to members of the CMS.

The award is presented at the CMS annual meeting.

== Recipients ==
1968 – Ralph E. Grim
1969 – C. S. Ross
1970 – Paul F. Kerr
1971 – Walter D. Keller
1972 – G. W. Brindley
1975 – William F. Bradley
1975 – Sturges W. Bailey
1975 – Jose J. Fripiat
1977 – M. L. Jackson
1979 – Toshio Sudo
1980 – Haydn H. Murray
1984 – C. Edmund Marshall
1985 – Charles E. Weaver
1988 – Max M. Mortland
1989 – R. C. Reynolds Jr.
1990 – Joe L. White
1990 – John Hower
1991 – Joe B. Dixon
1992 – Philip F. Low
1993 – Thomas J. Pinnavaia
1995 – W. D. Johns
1996 – Victor A. Drits
1997 – Udo Schwertmann
1998 – Brij L. Sawhney
2000 – Boris B. Zvyagin
2001 – Keith Norrish
2002 – Gerhard Lagaly
2004 – Benny K. G. Theng
2005 – M. Jeff Wilson
2006 – Frederick J. Wicks
2007 – no award made
2008 – Norbert Clauer
2009 – Joseph W Stucki
2010 – J. M. Serratosa
2011 – Sridhar Komarneni
2012 – Akihiko Yamagishi
2013 – Stephen Guggenheim
2014 – no award made
2015 – James Kirkpatrick
2016 – Lisa Heller-Kallai
2018 – Gordon "Jock" Churchman
2019 – Dennis D. Eberl
2020 – Eduardo Ruiz-Hitzky
2021 – David L. Bish

2024 - Jan Środon

== See also ==
- The Clay Minerals Society
- Clay minerals
