= Boris B. Zvyagin =

Russian mineralogist and crystallographer

Boris Borisovich Zvyagin (April 14, 1921 – September 18, 2002) was a Russian mineralogist and crystallographer. He is a pioneer in the structural study of layer minerals by electron diffraction and is also known for his work on modular structures, including polymorphism, polytypism, and order-disorder structures in crystals.

Zvyagin attended Moscow State University without entrance exams, graduating with a degree in physics in 1944. He worked at the All-Union Geological Institute since 1949 and was awarded doctor of science in 1963 at the Moscow Soil Institute. He then moved to the Institute of Ore Mineralogy of the Russian Academy of Sciences, heading the laboratory there. Zvyagin became a professor of crystallography and mineralogy in 1977 at the Russian Academy of Sciences.

Zvyagin was awarded the Bailey Distinguished Member Award by The Clay Minerals Society in 2000.

== Bibliography ==
- Zvyagin, Boris Borisovich (1967). Electron-diffraction analysis of clay mineral structures. N.Y.: Plenum Press. OCLC 869312135.
- Zvyagin, Boris B, ed. (1993). Proceedings of the First All-Union Symposium Electron Diffraction Methods for Substance Structure Investigations: Zvenigorod, November 1991. New York, NY: Allerton Press. OCLC 311907218.
