= Geoffrey Michael Gadd =

British-Irish mycologist-microbiologist

Geoffrey Michael Gadd OBE FRSB FLS FLSW FRSE
- Born: 15 July 1954 (age 72)
- Education: University College Cardiff
- Organization(s): University of Dundee, Chinese Academy of Sciences, Xinjiang Institute of Ecology and Geography, Urumqi, and China University of Petroleum-Beijing
- Known for: Studying the roles of fungi and other microbes in shaping the planet through metal and mineral biotransformations and their applied potential
- Notable work: Geomicrobiology, geomycology and bioremediation
- Children: Richard Gadd
- Website: www.lifesci.dundee.ac.uk/people/geoff-gadd www.lifesci.dundee.ac.uk/research/gmg

Geoffrey Michael Gadd OBE FRSB FLS FLSW FRSE (born 15 July 1954) is a British-Irish microbiologist and mycologist specializing in geomicrobiology, geomycology, and bioremediation. He is currently an emeritus professor at the University of Dundee.

Gadd contributes to his field's vitality via contributions to many professional societies and national and international editorial, advisory groups, and committees. He was President of the British Mycological Society (2004–2007), is currently Treasurer (2008–) and a member of several BMS committees. He served the former Society for General Microbiology (now Microbiology Society) as Convenor of the Environmental Microbiology group (2005–2008) and was the first Chair of the Eukaryotic Division (2008–2010). He also served on the Cell Biology; Physiology and Biochemistry; and Environmental Microbiology Groups and organized several SGM meetings and Main symposia.

He has given invited lectures at over 130 national/international venues and presented keynote/plenary lectures in over 20 countries.

== Career ==
Gadd gained a B.Sc. (1975) and Ph.D. (1978) in microbiology, University College Cardiff, Wales, and after an AFRC Postdoctoral Research Fellowship (1978) at the University of Dundee, with William Stewart, was appointed to a lectureship in microbiology (1979). He was promoted to personal chair in microbiology in 1995 and became head of the Department of Biological Sciences in 1999. He is a former deputy research director of the School of Life Sciences (2000-2006), head of the Division of Environmental and Applied Biology (2000-2007), Division of Molecular and Environmental Microbiology (2007-2009), and was founding head of the Division of Molecular Microbiology (2009).

Geoffrey Gadd currently holds the Boyd Baxter Chair of Biology at the School of Life Sciences at the University of Dundee and leads the Geomicrobiology Group. Research is in the field of geomicrobiology, particularly the roles of fungi and other microorganisms, in metal-mineral interactions and transformations, and their relevance to environmental processes, element cycling, mineral formation or dissolution, and bioremediation and element biorecovery. Most research has concentrated on fungi and has ranged from cellular and biochemical aspects to the environment and biotechnology, with other significant research on sulfate-reducing bacterial systems for metal bioremediation.

Original contributions relate to establishing the field of geomycology within geomicrobiology, and the multidisciplinary research outputs at the interface of microbiology, mineralogy, and geochemistry have greatly furthered understanding of the processes underlying metal and radionuclide accumulation, detoxification and tolerance, mechanisms affecting metal mobility in the environment, mineral dissolution, the formation of biogenic minerals, and biodeterioration of the built environment and cultural heritage. The environmental and biotechnological significance of these phenomena is a consistent focus.

== Recent research ==
The COG3 consortium is a NERC funded project joint with six universities from the UK and The Natural History Museum investigating “The Geology, Geometallurgy, and Geomicrobiology of Cobalt Resources Leading to New Product Streams” (joint with Natural History Museum and Universities of Manchester, Bangor, Exeter, Loughborough, and Southampton).

A recent paper with Marina Fomina and colleagues in Kyiv, Ukraine describes the isolation of a Rhodococcus aetherivorans strain from lubricant-contaminated soil as a prospective phenol biodegrading agent. The R. aetherivorans strain showed higher efficiency in phenol degradation compared to other strains of phenol degrading bacteria

== Publications ==
Publications include over 300 refereed papers, 2 co-authored books, over 50 edited books (2 as sole editor), and over 50 invited book chapters. Six patents have arisen from applied research relating to detoxification of metals and radionuclides. Web of Science analysis shows over 300 records, h-index = 64 (21 February 2020). Google Scholar shows 31759 citations and a h-index of 89 (3 September 2020). The latest book, co-authored with Byung Hong Kim, on Prokaryotic Metabolism and Physiology was published in 2019 by Cambridge University Press, The book describes the different metabolic processes of prokaryotic microorganisms taking place in different conditions and their roles in the environment, biotechnology, and human health. Gadd has published in a variety of important journals including Environmental Microbiology, Nature Microbiology, Nature Biotechnology, Current Biology, Environmental Science Nano and Fungal Biology.

== Honours and awards ==
- Mineralogical Society Schlumberger Award (2020) to 'recognize scientific excellence in mineralogy and its applications'
- European Mycological Association Prize (2019) (for 'outstanding work in mycological innovation'
- Visiting Professorship, China University of Petroleum-Beijing, College of Chemical Engineering and Environment (2019- )
- Adjunct Professor, Wuhan Botanical Garden, Chinese Academy of Sciences (2019- )
- Elected Member of the European Academy of Microbiology (2015)
- Fellow of the Learned Society of Wales (2014)
- Visiting Professorship, Chinese Academy of Sciences, Xinjiang Institute of Ecology and Geography, Urumqi, China. Sponsored by the Chinese Government 1000-Talents Programme for attraction of foreign experts (2014-2017)
- President's Award of the British Mycological Society (2012) (for outstanding service to the Society as well as international recognition in the promotion of fungal biology)
- Royal Society of Edinburgh Sir James Black Senior Medal for Life Sciences (2012) (award based on outstanding contribution to geomicrobiology)
- Wiley Award, Journal of Chemical Technology and Biotechnology: Most Downloaded Paper of 2009: in top 5 of most cited papers for JCTB (2010)
- Boyd Baxter Chair of Biology, University of Dundee (2010- )
- Colworth Prize of the Society for General Microbiology (2009) (award based on outstanding research contribution t* applied and environmental microbiology)
- Fellow of the Royal Society of Edinburgh (2007)
- Fellow of the International Union of Pure and Applied Chemistry (IUPAC) (2007)
- Benefactor’s Medal, British Mycological Society (2006)
- Charles Thom Award, Society for Industrial Microbiology, USA (2004) (award based on outstanding research contribution t* the applied microbiological sciences)
- Fellow of the Linnean Society (2003)
- Burroughs-Wellcome Visiting Professorship in the Microbiological Sciences, University of Guelph, Canada (2001)
- Honorary Research Associate, Scottish Crop Research Institute (now the James Hutton Institute) (2001)
- Fellow of the American Academy of Microbiology (1999)
- Fellow of the Royal Society of Biology (1995)
- DSc University of Wales (1994)
- Royal Society of Edinburgh, Scottish Office Education Department (SOED) Support Research Fellowship
- The Berkeley Award of the British Mycological Society (1990) (award based on appropriate evidence of an outstanding original research contribution to mycology).
