= Driz =

Driz is a surname. Notable people with the surname include:

- Deno Driz (born 2022, British-Eritrean singer, songwriter, rapper and actor
- Ovsey Driz – Soviet poet writing in Yiddish (1908–1971)

== See also ==
- Dritz
- Drits
