= Earth and Planetary Science Letters =

- Discipline: Planetary science
- Language: English
- Edited by: Tristan Horner, Yemane Asmerom, Jean-Philippe Avouac, James Badro, Huiming Bao, Rosemary Hickey-Vargas, Andrew Jacobson, Carolina Lithgow-Bertelloni, Olivier Mousis, Chiara Maria Petrone, Fang-Zhen Teng, Hans Thybo, Alexander Webb

Publication details
- History: 1966–present
- Publisher: Elsevier
- Frequency: 48/year
- Open access: Hybrid
- Impact factor: 4.8 (2025)

Standard abbreviations
- ISO 4: Earth Planet. Sci. Lett.

Indexing
- CODEN: EPSLA2
- ISSN: 0012-821X (print); 1385-013X (web)
- LCCN: 66009932
- OCLC no.: 1567193

Links
- Journal homepage; Online access

Earth and Planetary Science Letters is a bimonthly peer-reviewed scientific journal covering research on physical, chemical and mechanical processes of the Earth and other planets, including extrasolar ones. Topics covered range from deep planetary interiors to atmospheres. The journal was established in 1966 and is published by Elsevier. The co-editors-in-chief are Tristan Horner, Yemane Asmerom, Jean-Philippe Avouac, James Badro, Huiming Bao, Rosemary Hickey-Vargas, Andrew Jacobson, Carolina Lithgow-Bertelloni, Olivier Mousis, Chiara Maria Petrone, Fang-Zhen Teng, Hans Thybo, Alexander Webb.

== Abstracting and indexing ==
The journal is abstracted and indexed in:

- Chemical Abstracts Service
- Current Contents
- EBSCO databases
- GEOBASE
- GeoRef
- Inspec
- Meteorological & Geoastrophysical Abstracts
- Mineralogical Abstracts
- PASCAL
- Science Citation Index Expanded
- Scopus

According to the Journal Citation Reports, the journal has a 2025 impact factor of 4.8.
