= Rudorff =

Rudorff is a German surname. Notable people with the surname include:

- Adolf August Friedrich Rudorff (1803–1873), German lawyer and historian
- Ernst Rudorff (1840–1916), German musician, art educator and conservationist
- Franz von Rudorff (1825–1898), German infantry general
- Otto Rudorff (1845–1922), German legal scholar and judge, legal advisor in the Japanese Ministry of Justice in the Meiji era
- Wilhelm Heinrich von Rudorff (1741–1832), Prussian major general

== See also ==
- Walter Rüdorff (1909 – 1989), German chemist
- Rudorffer
