= Roger Powell (scientist) =

British-born Australia-based educator and academic

- Born: 14 June 1949 (age 77)
- Education: Durham University (BSc); University of Oxford (DPhil)
- Awards: FRS (2015); fellow of the Australian Academy of Science (2006)
- Scientific career
- Workplaces: University of Melbourne; University of Leeds
- Thesis: Mineral Equilibria in the Leven Schists near Fort William, Inverness-shire (1973)
- Doctoral advisor: Stephen W. Richardson
- Website: www.findanexpert.unimelb.edu.au/display/person16034

Roger Powell FRS, (born 14 June 1949) is a British-born Australia-based educator and academic. He is Emeritus professor in the School of Geography, Earth and Atmospheric Sciences at the University of Melbourne.

== Education ==
Powell was educated at Durham University where he was awarded a Bachelor of Science degree in 1970. He went on to study at the University of Oxford where he was awarded a Doctor of Philosophy degree in 1973 for research on mineral equilibria in the schist rock near Fort William, Scotland supervised by Stephen W. Richardson.

== Awards and honours ==
Powell was elected a Fellow of the Royal Society (FRS) in 2015. His nomination reads:

Roger Powell has pioneered the development of quantitative approaches to metamorphic rocks by the generation of thermodynamic models for minerals and fluids, and writing the software that implements them. The programs comprise a self-consistent thermodynamic database which describes equilibria among the multi-component mineral phases important in rocks and with full propagation of errors. They are among the most highly cited works in the geosciences. He has used these models to make fundamental advances in our understanding of metamorphic and igneous processes across a wide range of geological environments from the crust to deep mantle.

Powell, along with Timothy Holland of Cambridge University developed a widely used thermodynamic database for minerals and developed the THERMOCALC software to undertake calculations on geological material. The software and database are housed on the THERMOCALC website.

In addition to the above, Powell's was elected as a Fellow of the Australian Academy of Science in 2006.

His other awards include:

- the Mineralogical Society of Great Britain and Ireland's Schlumberger Medal in 2007
- the Norman L. Bowen Award in 2009
- the 2010 inaugural Ringwood Medal, Geological Society of Australia
- the 2013 Jaeger Medal, Australian Academy of Science
- the Barrow Award in 2021
