= Clay chemistry =

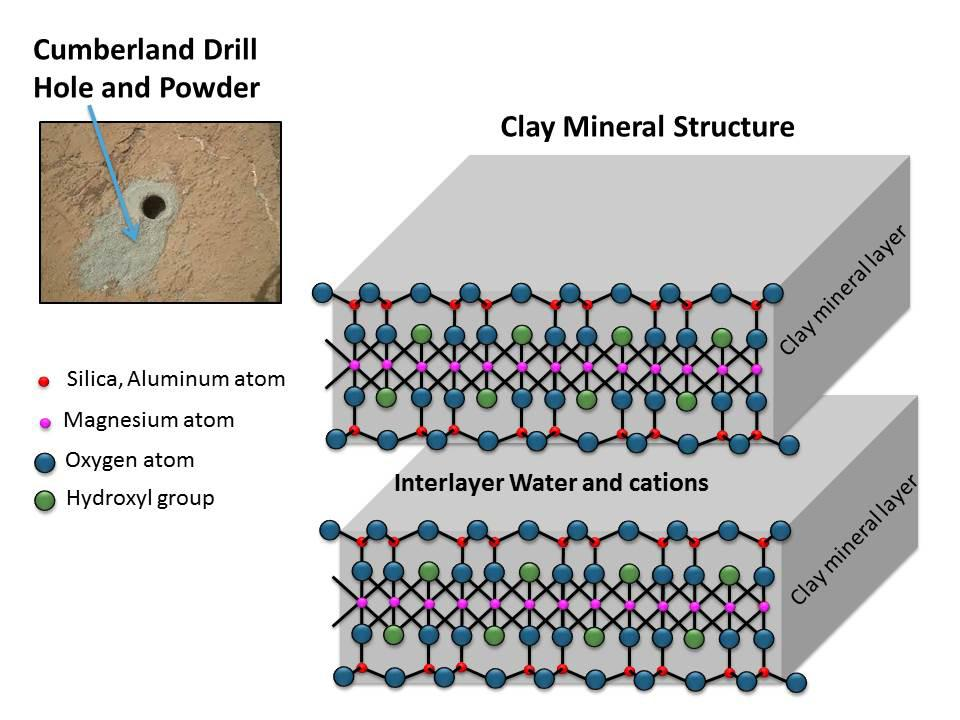

Clay chemistry is an applied subdiscipline of chemistry which studies the chemical structures, properties and reactions of or involving clays and clay minerals. It is a multidisciplinary field, involving concepts and knowledge from inorganic and structural chemistry, physical chemistry, materials chemistry, analytical chemistry, organic chemistry, mineralogy, geology and others.

The study of the chemistry (and physics) of clays and clay minerals is of great academic and industrial relevance as they are among the most widely used industrial minerals, being employed as raw materials (ceramics, pottery, etc.), adsorbents, catalysts, additives, mineral charges, medicines, building materials and others.

Properties of clay minerals include: nanometric scale layered construction, presence of fixed and interchangeable charges, possibility of adsorbing and intercalating molecules, ability of forming stable colloidal dispersions, possibility of tailored surface and interlayer chemical modification.

Many distinct fields and knowledge areas are impacted by the physico-chemical behavior of clay minerals, from environmental sciences to chemical process engineering, from pottery to nuclear waste management.

Their cation exchange capacity (CEC) is of great importance in the balance of the most common cations in soil (Na^{+}, K^{+}, NH_{4}^{+}, Ca^{2+}, Mg^{2+}) and pH control, with direct impact on the soil fertility. It also plays an important role in the fate of most Ca^{2+} arriving from land (river water) into the seas. The ability to change and control the CEC of clay minerals offers a valuable tool in the development of selective adsorbents with applications as varied as chemical sensors or pollution cleaning substances for contaminated water, for example.

The understanding of the reactions of clay minerals with water (intercalation, adsorption, colloidal dispersion, etc.) are indispensable for the ceramic industry (plasticity and flow control of ceramic raw mixtures, for example). Those interactions also influence a great number of mechanical properties of soils, being carefully studied by building and construction engineering specialists.

The interactions of clay minerals with organic substances in the soil also play a vital role in the fixation of nutrients and fertility, as well as in the fixation or leaching of pesticides and other contaminants. Some clay minerals (kaolinite) are used as carrier material for fungicides and insecticides.

The weathering of many rock types produce clay minerals as one of its last products. The understanding of these geochemical processes is also important for the understanding of geological evolution of landscapes and macroscopic properties of rocks and sediments. Presence of clay minerals in Mars, detected by the Mars Reconnaissance Orbiter in 2009 was another strong evidence of the existence of water on the planet in previous geological eras.

The possibility to disperse nanometric scaled clay mineral particles into a matrix of polymer, with the formation of an inorganic-organic nanocomposite has prompted a large resurgence in the study of these minerals from the late 1990s.

In addition, study of clay chemistry is also of great relevance to the chemical industry, as many clay minerals are used as catalysts, catalyst precursors or catalyst substrates in a number of chemical processes, like automotive catalysts and oil cracking catalysts.

== See also ==
- Clay – Fine grained natural soil
- Clay minerals – Fine-grained aluminium phyllosilicates
- Interface and colloid science – Branch of chemistry and physics
- The Clay Minerals Society – US-based non-profit organization
