= Hanns-Peter Boehm =

German chemist (1928–2022)

- Born: 9 January 1928; Paris, France
- Died: 10 May 2022 (aged 94)
- Education: University of Regensburg; Technische Universität Darmstadt
- Scientific career
- Fields: Chemist
- Workplaces: LMU Munich
- Doctoral advisor: Ulrich Hofmann
- Doctoral students: Robert Schlögl

Hanns-Peter Boehm (9 January 1928 – 10 May 2022) was a German chemist and professor emeritus at Ludwig-Maximilians-Universität München (LMU Munich) in Germany. Boehm is considered a pioneer of graphene research.

== Biography ==
Hanns-Peter Boehm studied chemistry in Regensburg from 1947 to 1951. He received his doctorate in 1953 at Technische Universität Darmstadt, where he also received his habilitation in 1959 with the treatise Oberflächenchemie und Adsorption an Kohlenstoff und SiO_{2}. In 1961, Boehm, together with Ralph Setton and Eberhard Stumpp, isolated and identified single graphene sheets by transmission electron microscopy (TEM) and X-ray diffraction. In 1986 they authored the IUPAC (International Union of Pure and Applied Chemistry) report formally defining the term graphene. In 1970 Boehm became professor and director of the Institute for Inorganic Chemistry of LMU Munich; in 1994 he retired to the status of professor emeritus.
