= Randall R. Parrish =

American isotope geologist

- Education: Middlebury College (BSc, 1974); University of British Columbia (MSc, 1977; PhD, 1982)
- Awards: Murchison Medal (2010); Schlumberger Medal (2010)
- Scientific career
- Fields: Geochronology and isotope geology
- Workplaces: Canadian Geological Survey; British Geological Survey
- Thesis: Cenozoic thermal and tectonic history of the Coast Mountains of British Columbia: as revealed by fission track and geological data and quantitative thermal models (1982)
- Doctoral advisor: Richard Lee Armstrong

Randall Richardson Parrish is an isotope geologist, who has developed improved methods of dating minerals and rocks using isotope geochronology. He was awarded the Murchison Medal of the Geological Society of London in 2010.

== Education ==
Parrish studied geology at Middlebury College, Vermont, and graduated in 1974 with a senior thesis on the tectonics and metamorphism of central Vermont. He then moved to the University of British Columbia, where he completed an MSc in 1977 with a study of some crystalline rocks of the Canadian Shield, and a PhD in 1982 with a study of the geological history of the Coast Mountains of British Columbia.

== Career ==
During his career, Parrish worked initially for the Canadian Geological Survey. Later, Parrish worked for the British Geological Survey, where he was head of the NERC isotope geosciences laboratory. In these roles, Parrish worked on multiple applications of isotope systems to the dating of geological events and processes, in settings from the Himalaya to the Canadian Shield. Parrish was awarded the Murchison Medal of the Geological Society of London in 2010, for his "fundamental contributions to geoscience through isotope geochronology". He was also awarded the Schlumberger Medal of the Mineralogical Society of Great Britain and Ireland in 2010 for scientific excellence in mineralogy and its applications.

In 2021, Parrish published a report on Gulf War syndrome. Parrish and his colleagues measured the isotopic composition of tiny amounts of uranium in urine samples, to establish how much exposure soldiers may have had to the depleted uranium that had been used in anti-tank munitions during the 1990-1991 Gulf War. Parrish’s study showed that there was no evidence to link depleted uranium to the syndrome.
