= Geochimica et Cosmochimica Acta =

- Discipline: Geochemistry, cosmochemistry, meteoritics
- Language: English
- Edited by: J. Catalano

Publication details
- History: 1950-present
- Publisher: Elsevier
- Frequency: Biweekly
- Impact factor: 5.0 (2024)

Standard abbreviations
- ISO 4: Geochim. Cosmochim. Acta

Indexing
- CODEN: GCACAK
- ISSN: 0016-7037
- LCCN: 53032712
- OCLC no.: 1570626

Links
- Journal homepage; Online access

Geochimica et Cosmochimica Acta (Latin for 'Geochemical and Cosmochemical Journal') is a biweekly peer-reviewed scientific journal published by Elsevier. It was established in 1950 and is sponsored by the Geochemical Society and the Meteoritical Society. The editor-in-chief is Jeffrey Catalano (Washington University in St. Louis). The journal covers topics in Earth geochemistry, planetary geochemistry, cosmochemistry and meteoritics.

Publishing formats include original research articles and invited reviews and occasional editorials, book reviews, and announcements. In addition, the journal publishes short comments (4 pages) targeting specific articles and designed to improve understanding of the target article by advocating a different interpretation supported by the literature, followed by a response by the author.

== Abstracting and indexing ==
The journal is abstracted and indexed in:

- BIOSIS Previews
- Current Contents/Physics, Chemical, & Earth Sciences
- Current Contents/Social & Behavioral Sciences
- Energy Data Base
- Energy Research Abstracts
- GeoBase
- Inspec
- International Aerospace Abstracts
- Mineralogical Abstracts
- PASCAL
- Scopus

According to the Journal Citation Reports, the journal has a 2024 impact factor of 5.0.
