= Alexander von Humboldt Foundation =

International academic organization

- Alexander von Humboldt-Stiftung
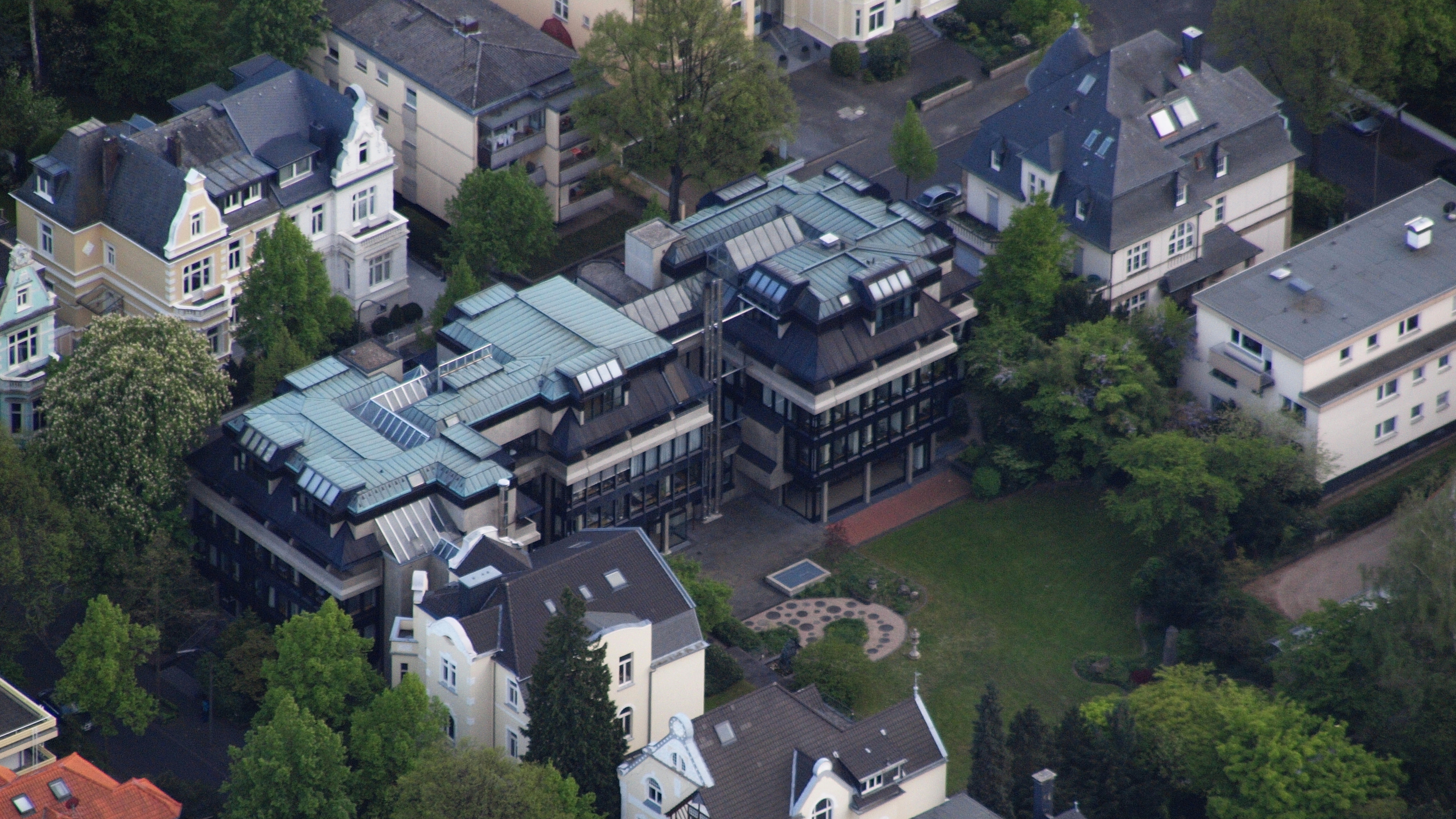
- Building of Alexander-von-Humboldt-Stiftung in Bonn
- Abbreviation: AvH
- Founded: 1953
- Headquarters: Bonn / Berlin, Germany
- President: Robert Schlögl
- Budget: 168.213.434 € (2025)
- Website: www.humboldt-foundation.de

The Alexander von Humboldt Foundation (German: Alexander von Humboldt-Stiftung) is a foundation that promotes international academic cooperation between scientists and scholars from Germany and abroad. Established by the government of the Federal Republic of Germany, it is funded by the Federal Foreign Office, the Federal Ministry of Education and Research, the Federal Ministry for Economic Cooperation and Development, and other national and international partners.

== Description ==
Annually, the Foundation grants over 700 competitive research fellowships and awards, primarily to academics in the natural sciences, mathematics and the humanities. These enable scientists and scholars from around the world to conduct research in Germany, collaborating with a host and partner of their choosing. In addition, the Foundation funds German scholars through the Feodor Lynen Fellowships, allowing them to pursue research projects worldwide with a host and partner who must have previously held an Alexander von Humboldt fellowship. The fellowships and awards include significant prizes, such as the Alexander von Humboldt Professorship and Sofia Kovalevskaya Awards. Fellowships and awards from the Foundation are considered among the most prestigious and generous in Germany. Its alumni network, comprising over 26,000 Humboldtians in more than 140 countries, including 57 Nobel laureates, is the foundation's greatest asset.

== History ==
The Foundation was initially established in Berlin in 1860 to support German scientists conducting research abroad. It was named after the polymath Alexander von Humboldt. In 1923, during the hyperinflation, the Foundation ceased operations due to capital constraints. It was re-established in 1925 with a new goal: to attract talented, pro-German students from other countries to study and research in Germany. Following the fall of Germany in 1945, the Foundation closed for a second time. It was re-established in Bonn-Bad Godesberg on December 10, 1953, under the leadership of physicist Werner Heisenberg, with a new mission: "to grant fellowships to academics of foreign nationality, without regard to gender, race, religion, or ideology, to enable them to continue their academic training by a study-visit to Germany". In 2016, the Foundation helped establish the German Section of the Scholars at Risk (SAR) network, a group of research institutions, universities, and science organizations committed to supporting at-risk academics and promoting academic freedom.

== Prizes and scholarships ==
- Alexander von Humboldt Professorship, the most valuable research award in Germany (3.5/5 million Euros)
- Humboldt grants for researchers to work in Germany
- Feodor Lynen grants for researchers from Germany to work abroad
- Humboldt Prize (Humboldt Research Award)
- Max Planck-Humboldt Research Award, awarded jointly with the Max-Planck Society to a researcher from outside Germany
- Sofia Kovalevskaya Award, given from 2002 to 2020.
- Anneliese Maier research prize for humanities and social sciences from outside Germany
- Georg Forster research prize for researchers from developing countries
- Gay-Lussac–Humboldt research prize to French scientists, awarded with the French Ministry for Education.
- Friedrich Wilhelm Bessel research prize (since 2001)
- German Chancellor Fellowship, given from 1990-2025.
