= Robert Schlögl =

German chemist

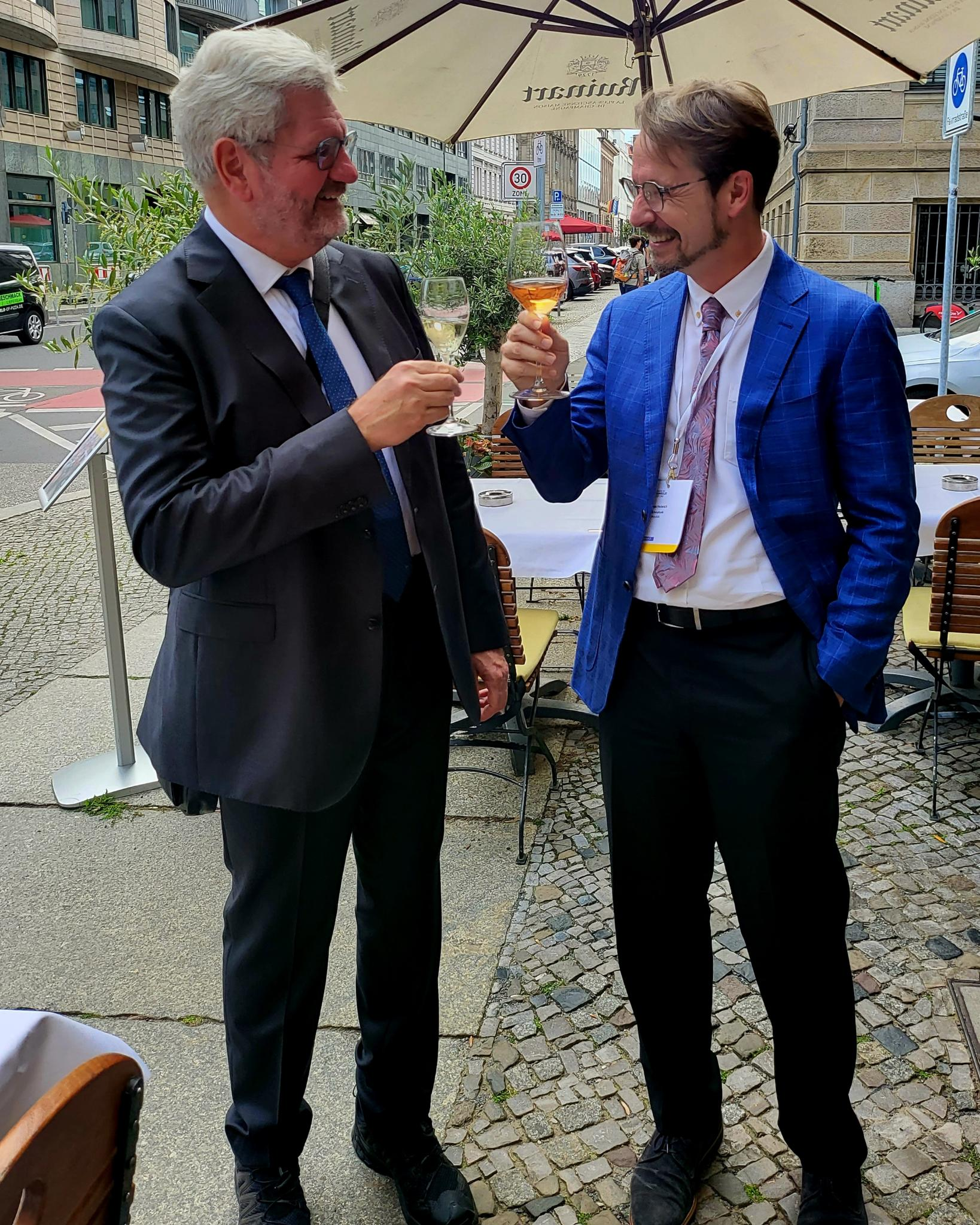
- Robert Schlögl and Andreas J. Heinrich
- Born: 23 February 1954 (age 72); Munich, Germany
- Education: LMU Munich
- Scientific career
- Institutions: Roche; Technische Universität Berlin; Goethe University Frankfurt; Fritz Haber Institute of the Max Planck Society; Max Planck Institute for Chemical Energy Conversion
- Thesis: Marginalien in schwarz, Beitrag zur Chemie der Intercalations-Reaktion in Graphit (1982)
- Doctoral advisor: Hanns-Peter Boehm
- Other academic advisors: John Meurig Thomas; Hans-Joachim Güntherodt; Gerhard Ertl
- Website: www.fhi-berlin.mpg.de/acnew/department/pages/director.html www.cec.mpg.de/de/forschung/heterogene-reaktionen/prof-dr-robert-schloegl

Robert Schlögl (born 23 February 1954 in Munich) is a German chemist known for research in catalysis. Currently, he is the Director and Scientific Member of the Fritz Haber Institute of the Max Planck Society in Berlin and the Max Planck Institute for Chemical Energy Conversion in Mülheim an der Ruhr. He became president of the Alexander von Humboldt Foundation in 2023.

== Life and work ==
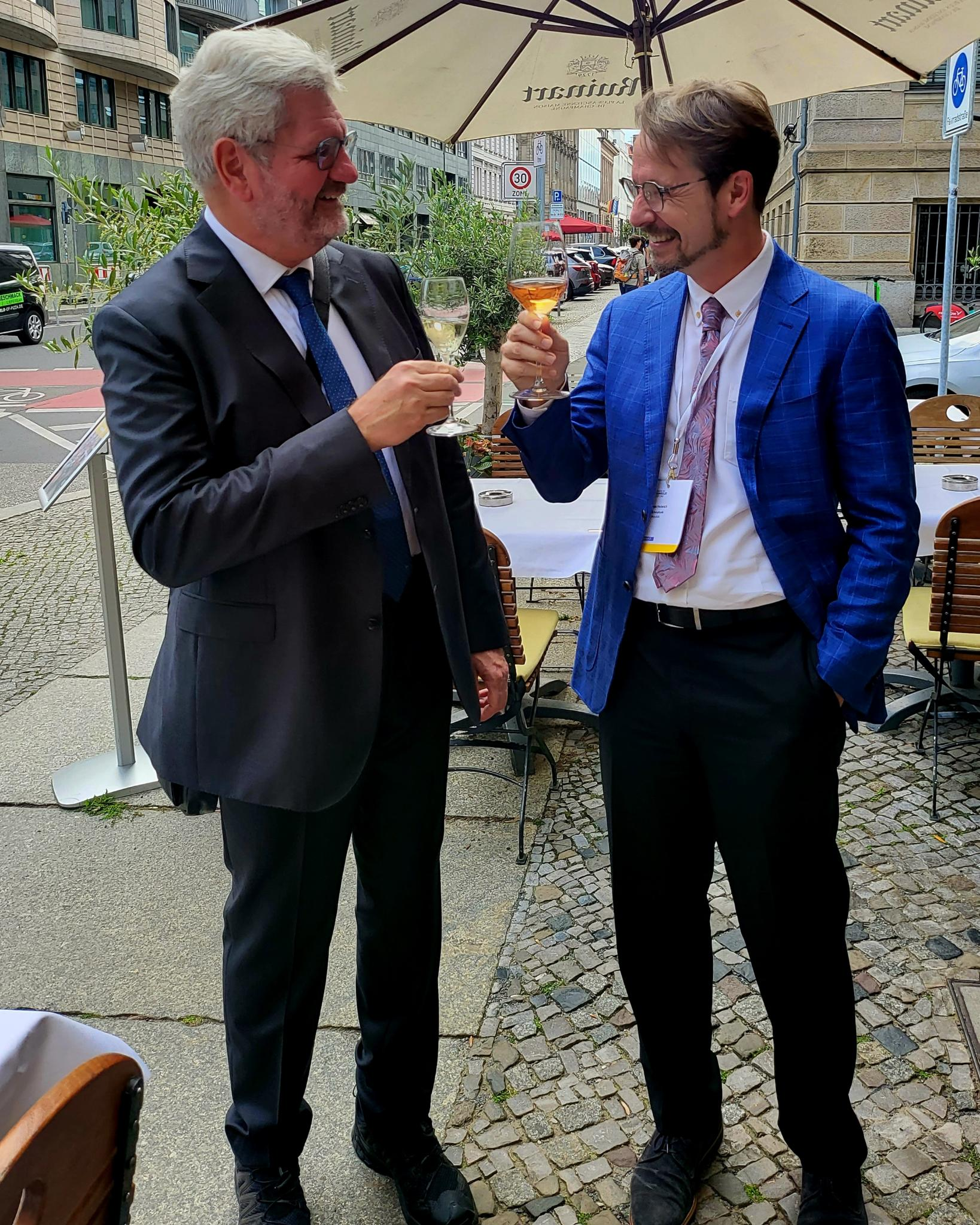
Robert Schlögl (left) and Andreas J. Heinrich (right) during the awarding of the 2023 Humboldt Prize in Germany.

Schlögl studied chemistry at LMU Munich where he received his bachelor's degree in 1979 and his doctorate in 1982. After postdoctoral studies at University of Cambridge under Sir John Meurig Thomas, at the University of Basel under Hans-Joachim Güntherodt, and at the Fritz Haber Institute under Gerhard Ertl, he completed his Habilitation in Chemistry at Technische Universität Berlin in 1989. This was followed by a call to Goethe University Frankfurt as Professor of Inorganic Chemistry. Schlögl returned to Technische Universität Berlin and has been Director and Scientific Member of the Fritz Haber Institute since 1994. In 2011, he was also founding director at the Max Planck Institute for Chemical Energy Conversion.

Schlögl is a researcher in catalysis who has made crucial contributions to the elucidation of the structural dynamics and functionality of heterogeneous catalysts based on inorganic solids. The focus of his work is on the investigation of polycrystalline copper, molybdenum and vanadium oxides for selective oxidation.

== Honors and awards ==
Schlögl received numerous awards and distinctions. He was awarded the Otto Bayer Award and the Schunk Prize for innovative materials. In 2015, he received the Alwin Mittasch Prize, in 2017 the Ruhr Prize for Art and Science. For 2019, Schlögl was awarded the Eduard Rhein Prize. He is also a member of the Berlin-Brandenburg Academy of Sciences and honorary professor at Technische Universität Berlin and Humboldt University of Berlin. Schlögl has been a member of the Leopoldina since 2011 and is a member of the German Academy of Engineering Sciences (Acatech). He also serves on the Board of Trustees of ESYS – Energy Systems of the Future, a joint initiative of acatech, Leopoldina and the Union of Academies.

== Personal life ==
In April 2023, Schlögl was one of the 22 personal guests at the ceremony in which former Chancellor Angela Merkel was decorated with the Grand Cross of the Order of Merit for special achievement by President Frank-Walter Steinmeier at Schloss Bellevue in Berlin.

== Publications (selection) ==
- As editor with Jürgen Renn and Hans-Peter Zenner: Herausforderung Energie: ausgewählte Vorträge der 126. Versammlung der Gesellschaft Deutscher Naturforscher und Ärzte e.V., Berlin : Ed. Open Access 2011, ISBN 978-3-8442-0500-8.
- (Ed.): Chemical energy storage, Berlin; Boston, Mass.: De Gruyter 2013, ISBN 978-3-11-026407-4.
