= Ulrich Hofmann =

German chemist (1903–1986)

- Born: January 22, 1903; Munich, Germany
- Died: July 5, 1986 (aged 83); Heidelberg, Germany
- Education: Technische Universität Berlin
- Father: Karl Andreas Hofmann
- Scientific career
- Workplaces: Technische Universität Berlin; University of Rostock; Vienna University of Technology; University of Regensburg; Technische Universität Darmstadt; Heidelberg University
- Thesis: Glanzkohlenstoff und die Reihe des schwarzen kristallinen Kohlenstoffs
- Doctoral advisor: Karl Andreas Hofmann
- Doctoral students: Hanns-Peter Boehm; Walter Rüdorff; Armin Weiss

Ulrich Hofmann (January 22, 1903 – July 5, 1986) was a German chemist known for his study of clay minerals and the pioneering use of electron microscopes in the study of carbonaceous materials.

== Education and career ==
Hofmann was born in Munich in 1903 and the son of the German chemist Karl Andreas Hofmann. He studied chemistry at Technische Universität Berlin and obtained a diploma in 1925. He went on to receive his doctorate in 1926 from his father with the work Glanzkohlenstoff und die Reihe des schwarzen kristallinen Kohlenstoffs (Lustrous carbon and the series of black crystalline carbon). In 1931, he received habilitation on graphite oxide and then worked as a lecturer at Technische Universität Berlin.

In 1937, Hofmann joined the NSDAP. In the same year, he also became a professor of chemistry and the head of the Institute of Chemistry at the University of Rostock. He only served briefly in World War II since he was released for war-related work. In 1942, he became head of the Institute for Inorganic and Analytical Chemistry at the Vienna University of Technology, where he also installed an electron microscope by Manfred von Ardenne. In 1945, Hofmann left Vienna and, from 1948, taught chemistry and set up his laboratory at the Philosophical-Theological University of Regensburg (now University of Regensburg), where no chemistry had previously been taught. In 1951, he became professor of inorganic and physical chemistry at Technische Universität Darmstadt. In 1960, Hofmann became head of the Institute for Inorganic Chemistry at Heidelberg University, where he later retired in 1971.

== Scientific research ==
Hofmann's research dealt in particular with the chemistry of clay minerals, as well as with pigments and ancient ceramics. In the 1930s, he and Kurd Endell examined the structure of clay minerals using X-ray structure analysis, among other things. Among other things, they published in 1933 on the structure of the clay mineral montmorillonite. Together with Kurd Endell, he also found the reason why German bentonites, in contrast to those from Wyoming in the USA, were not suitable for the construction industry - the cation between the silicate layers was sodium in American bentonite, and calcium or magnesium in German deposits. However, German bentonite could also be used by adding sodium carbonate, which they patented in 1934/35. Hofmann also examined other clays (such as kaolin) to see how the properties (e.g., swelling behavior) changed with the cations between the silicate layers when absorbing water.

Continuing the work of Peter Debye and Paul Scherrer, who analyzed the structure of graphite and diamond with X-rays, he studied lustrous carbon and graphite oxide, among other things. He studied, for example, the absorptivity and catalytic activity of graphite and graphite growth at high temperatures. This also brought him into contact with industries such as Siemens-Plania in Berlin before World War II. In 1941, together with Manfred von Ardenne, he examined carbon black particles using an electron microscope and found them to be made up of chains of spherical carbon structures.

== Honors and awards ==
In 1952, he became the first president of the German Society for Electron Microscopy. In 1955, he received the Alfred Stock Memorial Prize, in 1964 the Seger Plaque, and in 1965 the Wolfgang Ostwald Prize. He was a member of the Heidelberg Academy of Sciences (1961) and the Leopoldina (1962). In 1968, he received an honorary doctorate from LMU Munich.
