= Jon Lloyd (microbiologist) =

British geomicrobiologist

Jonathan Richard Lloyd
- Scientific career
- Fields: Microbiology, radiochemistry
- Institutions: The University of Manchester
- Thesis: The physiological state of microbial cells immobilised in hollow-fibre membrane bioreactors

Jonathan Richard Lloyd is a professor of geomicrobiology and director of the Williamson Research Centre for Molecular Environmental Science, and is based in the Department of Earth and Environmental Sciences at the University of Manchester. His research is based at the interface between microbiology, geology and chemistry. His research focuses on the mechanisms of microbial metal-reduction, with emphasis on the environmental impact and biotechnological applications of metal-reducing bacteria. Some of the contaminants he studies include As, Tc, Sr, U, Np and Pu. Current activities are supported by funds from NERC, BBSRC, EPSRC (The Engineering and Physical Sciences Research Council), the EU and industry. Lloyd is also a senior visiting fellow at the National Nuclear Laboratory, which helps support the development of a nuclear geomicrobiology programme.

== Education ==
Lloyd was born in Hemel Hempstead UK in 1966. He holds a BSc(Hons) Applied Biology from the University of Bath, following this Lloyd read his PhD in Microbiology at the University of Kent. He completed his thesis titled: The physiological state of microbial cells immobilised in hollow-fibre membrane bioreactors in 1993.

== Research and career ==
Lloyd has published more than 250 papers that focus on understanding how microbes interact with, and control the chemistry of the subsurface, and how natural microbial processes and microbial metabolisms can be harnessed for a wide range of biotechnological applications. His publications have featured in nature, ES&T, Chemical Geology, Mineralogical Magazine, and Science of the Total Environment. His research has investigated the role of U(V) during U(VI) bioreduction by Fe(III)-reducing bacteria Geobacter sulfurreducens and Shewanella oneidensis MR1. Lloyd has also led investigations into microbial activities under highly alkaline conditions such as those that would be found in a geological disposal facility, or those found in Nuclear legacy cooling ponds.

=== Major reviews ===
1. Newsome, Laura; Morris, Katherine; Lloyd, Jonathan R. (January 2014). "The biogeochemistry and bioremediation of uranium and other priority radionuclides". Chemical Geology. 363: 164–184. Bibcode:2014ChGeo.363..164N. doi:10.1016/j.chemgeo.2013.10.034.
2. Renshaw, Joanna C.; Lloyd, Jonathon R.; Livens, Francis R. (October 2007). "Microbial interactions with actinides and long-lived fission products". Comptes Rendus Chimie. 10 (10–11): 1067–1077. doi:10.1016/j.crci.2007.02.013.
3. Lloyd, Jonathan R. (June 2003). "Microbial reduction of metals and radionuclides". FEMS Microbiology Reviews. 27 (2–3): 411–425. doi:10.1016/S0168-6445(03)00044-5. PMID 12829277.
4. Lloyd, J. R.; Chesnes, J.; Glasauer, S.; Bunker, D. J.; Livens, F. R.; Lovley, D. R. (January 2002). "Reduction of Actinides and Fission Products by Fe(III)-Reducing Bacteria". Geomicrobiology Journal. 19 (1): 103–120. doi:10.1080/014904502317246200. S2CID 98661795.
5. Lloyd, Jonathan R; Lovley, Derek R (June 2001). "Microbial detoxification of metals and radionuclides". Current Opinion in Biotechnology. 12 (3): 248–253. doi:10.1016/s0958-1669(00)00207-x. PMID 11404102.

=== Awards and honours ===
Lloyd was awarded the 2006 Geological Society of London Bigsby Medal, the 2018 Schlumberger Medal of the Mineralogical Society of Great Britain and Ireland, and in 2014 was cited as one of the Top 100 Practicing UK Scientists by the UK Science Council. From 2010 to 2014 he was a Royal Society Industrial Fellow, and from 2015 to 2020 a Royal Society Wolfson Fellowship Award holder.
