= Richard Lee Armstrong =

American geologist

Dr. Richard Lee Armstrong
- Born: August 4, 1937; Seattle, Washington, US
- Died: August 9, 1991 (aged 54); Vancouver, British Columbia Canada
- Citizenship: Canadian
- Education: Yale University
- Known for: Crustal recycling
- Awards: Killam Prize; Logan Medal (1990)
- Scientific career
- Fields: Geology; Geochemistry; Geochronology
- Workplaces: Yale University; University of British Columbia
- Doctoral advisor: Karl Turekian
- Doctoral students: Randall R. Parrish

Richard Lee Armstrong FRSC (August 4, 1937 – August 9, 1991) was an American-Canadian scientist who was an expert in the fields of radiogenic isotope geochemistry and geochronology, geochemical evolution of the earth, geology of the American Cordillera, and large-magnitude crustal extension. He published over 170 scientific papers.

== Education ==
Armstrong was born in Seattle, Washington. In 1955, he moved to New Haven, Connecticut, to attend Yale University. He obtained his BSc in 1959 and a PhD in 1964. He stayed at Yale as assistant and associate professor in the geology department until 1973. While he was a Yale professor, he took two leaves, the first in 1963–1964 on a National Science Foundation Postdoctoral Fellowship at the University of Berne, and in 1968–1969 as a Morse and Guggenheim Fellow at the Australian National University and California Institute of Technology.

== Career ==
In 1973, Armstrong moved to Vancouver, British Columbia, Canada to be an associate professor at the University of British Columbia. He was eventually made a full professor. In 1979, he became a Canadian citizen.

Armstrong studied the chronology of magmatism, metamorphism, and tectonics of western North America. He utilized several methodologies, including Potassium-Argon, Rubidium-Strontium, Uranium-Lead and Neodymium-Samarium to obtain isotopic data.

Armstrong's early theories guided research for a generation. His views were controversial and contested by many prominent isotope geochemists. It took decades for other scientists to accept his ideas. Before he died, Armstrong was vindicated through the recognition he received for his model of crustal recycling at the 1990 ICOG meeting in Canberra after presenting a paper on "The Persistent Myth of Crustal Growth".

Most of Armstrong's effort was spent systematically building an enormous database on the geochronology of the North American Cordillera. This database highlighted the magmatic evolution of the region and continues to provide a wealth of information to the scientific community.

Armstrong was an active member of the Geological Society of America and editorial boards for several journals. He participated in the peer review process of the National Science Foundation and Canada's Natural Sciences and Engineering Research Council. He also participated in Canada's Lithoprobe program a national geoscience research project and contributed to the development of the geological timescale, particularly the Triassic.

On August 9, 1991, Armstrong died of liver cancer, five days after his 54th birthday.

== Accolades ==
- 1981, made a fellow of the Royal Society of Canada
- 1986, awarded a Killam Prize by the University of British Columbia
- 1990, awarded the Logan Medal by the Geological Association of Canada
- The Richard Lee Armstrong Endowment Fund, an endowed scholarship, was established at the Department of Earth Sciences, University of British Columbia after his death
- A new radiogenic isotope laboratory was dedicated to his memory by the University of British Columbia
- The asteroid 21362 Dickarmstrong

== Often cited and recognized papers ==
- Armstrong, R.L.. 1966. K-Ar dating of plutonic and volcanic rocks in orogenic belts: Age determination by potassium argon: Heidelberg, Springer-Verlag, pp. 117–133.
- Armstrong, R.L.. 1968. A Model for the Evolution of Strontium and Lead Isotopes in a Dynamic Earth: Reviews of Geophysics, v. 6, pp. 175–199.
- Armstrong, R.L.. 1972. Low-angle faults, hinterland of the Sevier orogenic belt, eastern Nevada and western Utah: Geological Society of America Bulletin, v. 83, pp. 1729–1754.
- Armstrong, R.L.. 1981. Radiogenic isotopes; The case for crustal recycling on a near-steady-state no-continental-growth Earth: Royal Society of London Philosophical Transactions, v. 301, pp. 443–472.
- Armstrong, R.L., 1988. Mesozoic and Early Cenozoic Magmatism of the Canadian Cordillera. doi: 10.1130/SPE218-p55 GSA Special Papers 1988, v. 218, pp. 55–92
- Armstrong, R.L, Parrish, R.. 1990. A geologic excursion across the Canadian Cordillera near 49°N (Highways 1 and 3 from Vancouver to southwestern Alberta and on to Calgary, Alberta): Geological Association of Canada Meeting, Vancouver, May, Field Trip Guidebook, 71 p.
- Harland, W.B.; Armstrong, R.L.; Cox, A.V.; Craig, L.E.; Smith, A.G.; Smith, D.G., 1990. A Geologic Time Scale, 1989 edition. Cambridge University Press: Cambridge, pp. 1–263. ISBN 0-521-38765-5
- Armstrong, R.L., 1991. The Persistent Myth of Crustal Growth. Austral. J. Earth Sci., Vol: 38:613–630

== See also ==
- Age of the Earth
