= Georges Calas =

French mineralogist

Georges Calas is professor of mineralogy (Emeritus) at Sorbonne Université and an honorary Senior Member of University Institute of France.

== Education ==
Calas was educated at the École normale supérieure de Saint-Cloud (now École normale supérieure de Lyon) where he graduated in natural sciences and at Pierre-and-Marie-Curie University where he received his doctorate.

== Career ==
Prior to his appointment at Pierre-and-Marie-Curie University, Calas has been researcher at CNRS, then full professor (1981–2001) at Paris Diderot University where he chaired the Department of Earth Sciences. He was elected Senior member of the University Institute of France (IUF) in 2007 and renewed in 2012. He has been Allan Cox visiting professor at Stanford University and Royal Society visiting scientist at the Universities of Oxford and Edinburgh. He made major scientific contributions over the past 4.5 decades in geochemistry, mineralogy, and materials sciences, with a focus on molecular-scale approaches, the structure/property relationships in minerals and glasses including industrial materials, the environmental geochemistry and mineralogy of heavy metal contaminants, the nuclear waste glasses and the radiation damage in glasses and minerals. More recently, his research has extended to mineral resources and their sustainable development and to cultural heritage materials such as medieval stained glasses. He has been a pioneer in the use of solid-state spectroscopy in these scientific areas, particularly using synchrotron radiation. From 2005 to 2008, he was Associate member of the Stanford Environmental Molecular Science Institute at Stanford University. He held the chair on Sustainable Development– Environment, energy and society at Collège de France in 2014–2015. The topic of this Chair was: " Mineral Resources – A Major Challenge in the Context of Sustainable Development".

Calas served on the board of directors of the Bureau de Recherches Géologiques et Minières and chaired various national and regional scientific networks and audit committees. He has been chair of the Commission on Physics of Minerals at the International Mineralogical Association. A former Principal Editor of the journals Elements and Terra Nova, he serves on the editorial board of Physics and Chemistry of Minerals, Geochimica et Cosmochimica Acta and the Journal of the American Ceramic Society.

== PublicationsInternational Mineralogical Association ==
- Calas has published 350 articles and book chapters, gathering more than 18,000 citations, according to Google Scholar.

== Honors ==
Calas has received the best paper Award of the Mineralogical Society of America in 1999, the Ivan Peyches Award (Materials Sciences) of the French Academy of Sciences in 2002, the Léon Bertrand Medal (Applied Geology) of the Société Géologique de France in 2006, the Schlumberger Award of the Mineralogical Society of Great Britain and Ireland in 2011, the Dolomieu Medal (Earth Sciences) of the French Academy of Sciences in 2011, the Merit Award of the Société française de minéralogie et de cristallographie in 2020 and the IMA Medal for Excellence in Mineralogical Research of the International Mineralogical Association in 2020. He is a fellow of the Mineralogical Society of America, the Geochemical Society and European Association of Geochemistry, the Society of Glass Technology and the American Ceramic Society. He is an Honorary Fellow of the Mineralogical Society of Great Britain and Ireland.

He was President of the Société française de minéralogie et de cristallographie in 1992 and was elected to Academia Europaea in 2011 and to the Royal Society of Canada in 2014. In 2023, Calas was awarded the Roebling Medal, the highest honor at the Mineralogical Society of America.
