= Walter Rüdorff =

German chemist

Walter Rüdorff (October 3, 1909 – April 1, 1989) was a German chemist known for his research on clathrates of graphite and ternary oxides.

== Education and career ==
Rüdorff was born in Berlin in 1909. He studied chemistry as an undergraduate at Technische Hochschule Berlin (now Technische Universität Berlin) and graduated in 1925. His graduate study was carried out under the supervision of Ulrich Hofmann at the same university, where he graduated with a PhD thesis titled Über die Kristallstruktur der Hexacarbonyle von Chrom, Molybdän und Wolfram. He then moved to the University of Rostock along with Ulrich Hofmann and achieved his habilitation status with the thesis titled Neuartige Verbindungen mit Graphit in 1941. In 1942, Rüdorff moved to TU Wien following Ulrich Hofmann. He later took up a faculty position at University of Tübingen in 1947. He stayed in Tübingen until his retirement.

Along with his supervisor Ulrich Hofmann and his father Karl Andreas Hofmann, Rüdorff cowrote the famous textbook on inorganic chemistry that are referred to as Rüdorff-Hofmann.

== Scientific research ==
Rüdorff and Ulrich Hofmann's work on graphite intercalation compound and sulfuric acid became an ancestor of lithium-ion battery.

Rüdorff's team discovered the ternary oxide series (including LiVO_{2} and NaVO_{2}) in 1954 with a unique structure. The compounds with the same structural type are called rudorffites for this reason.

Rüdorff's work in 1965 on hosting lithium in titanium disulfide (TiS_{2}) inspired early efforts into using metal chalcogenides as battery cathode material.

== See also ==
- Ulrich Hofmann
