= Armin Weiss =

German chemist (1927–2010)

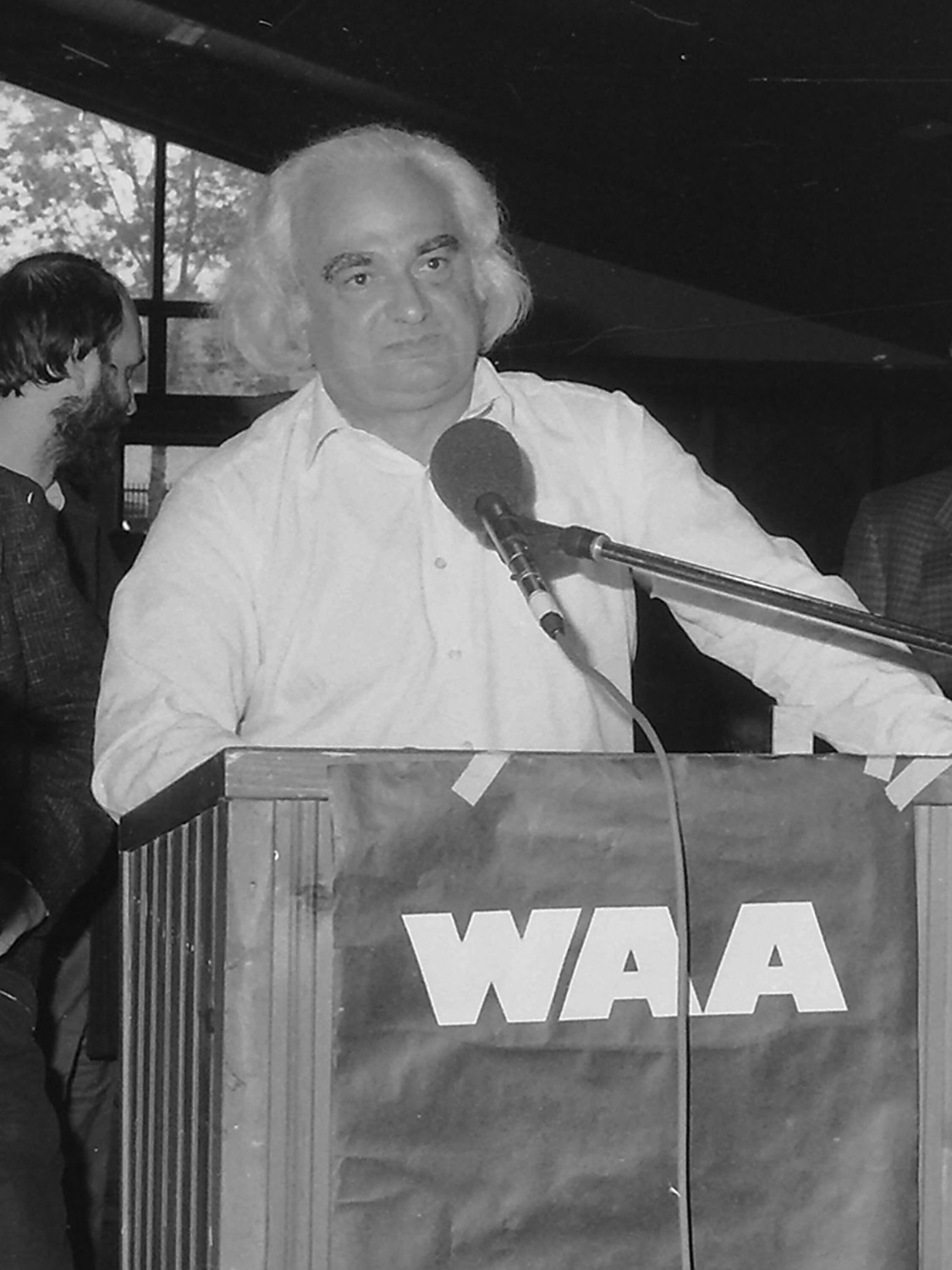
- Armin Weiss (1988)
- Born: 5 November 1927; Stefling part of Nittenau, Germany
- Died: 7 December 2010 (aged 83); Munich, Germany
- Education: University of Regensburg; University of Würzburg; Darmstadt University of Technology
- Awards: Liebig Medal 1981; Nuclear-Free Future Lifetime Achievement Award 2007
- Scientific career
- Fields: inorganic chemistry
- Workplaces: University of Heidelberg 1961–1965; LMU Munich 1965–1996
- Doctoral advisor: Ulrich Hofmann
- Doctoral students: Gerhard Lagaly, Brigitte Eisenmann

Armin Weiss (or Weiß in German script) (5 November 1927 – 7 December 2010) was a German inorganic chemist and politician of the Green Party.

== Life ==
Weiss was born and raised in Stefling (near Nittenau), not far from Wackersdorf, where during the 1980s, the West German nuclear industry began building the nuclear reprocessing plant Wackersdorf. Upset by this move, Weiss took leave from his position as Professor of Inorganic Chemistry at LMU Munich, and began making public appearances in opposition to the plant. Eventually the construction of Wackersdorf was stopped. Later, as a member of the Bavarian state government, he continued to oppose nuclear plants. In 2007, Professor Weiss received the Nuclear-Free Future Lifetime Achievement Award.

== Work ==
The intercalation in clay minerals was major research interest during the start of his academic career. Urea has been used as compound for the production of high quality china for a long time but the mechanism of action was first described by Weiss in 1961.

== See also ==
- Anti-nuclear movement in Germany
