= European Mycological Association =

Mycological association in Europe

- Abbreviation: EMA
- Formation: September 2003; 23 years ago
- Founded at: XIV Congress of European Mycologists, Katsiveli, Crimea, Ukraine
- Type: Nonprofit
- Origins: Congress of European Mycologists
- Region served: Europe
- President: Dr. Izabela Kałucka
- Vice President: Dr. Irmgard Greilhuber
- Website: http://www.euromould.org/

The European Mycological Association (EMA) is an organization with a broad scope encompassing all aspects of mycology within Europe, this includes lichens as well as fungus-like organisms such as oomycetes and slime moulds. The Association was formed in September 2003 at the 14th Congress of European Mycologists. More than 110 delegates from around 30 countries were present and the idea of establishing a European Mycological Association received universal support. Since then the EMA has taken on the patronage of all meetings of the Congress of European Mycologists. It has also adopted the European Council for the Conservation of Fungi as its conservation body.

The EMA is recognized by the International Mycological Association, and the Governing Committee of the EMA serves as the Committee for Fungi in Europe within the International Mycological Association. The association currently has members in 37 different European countries.

The first Congress organised by the EMA was the 15th to be held since 1956 when they began. It took place in St. Petersburg, Russia in 2007.
