= Mineralogical Society of Great Britain and Ireland =

Scientific organization promoting mineralogy

The Mineralogical Society of Great Britain and Ireland (now known as the Mineralogical Society of the United Kingdom and Ireland) was founded in 1876. Its main purpose is to disseminate scientific knowledge of the Mineral Sciences (mineralogy) as it may be applied to the fields of crystallography, geochemistry, petrology, environmental science and economic geology. In support of this vision, the society publishes scientific journals, books and monographs. It also organizes and sponsors scientific meetings, and the society connects with other societies which have similar scientific interests. Some of these other societies are the International Mineralogical Association, the European Mineralogical Union, the Mineralogical Society of America, the Mineralogical Association of Canada, the Geological Society of London, IOM3, the North of England Institute of Mining and Mechanical Engineers and the Microbiology Society.

== Publications ==
The Society publishes a variety of book series; these are entitled the "Landmark Series", the "Mineralogical Society Special Series", and the "Monograph series". It also publishes scientific journals entitled Mineralogical Magazine, Clay Minerals, and the EMU Notes in Mineralogy. From 1920 to 2008 it also published the Mineralogical Abstracts bibliographic database. Mineralogical Magazine and Clay Minerals are hybrid journals, publishing both subscription-based and open access articles.

== Awards and honours ==
Aside from the denotation of senior members or Fellows of the Society that are permitted to use the post-nomial 'FMinSoc', the Society recognises distinguished accomplishments through medals, lectures, honorary fellowships and awards:

- The Mineralogical Society-Schlumberger Medal, given from 1990 to 2021 through the generous sponsorship of Schlumberger Cambridge Research, is the most prestigious honour bestowed by the Society. It is awarded to recognise scientific excellence in mineralogy and its applications. From 2022, this award was renamed the Neumann Medal, in honour of Dr Barbara Neumann, a clay mineralogist and inventor of laponite. The criteria for the award remained the same.
- The Max Hey Medal, given since 1993, recognises research of excellence carried out by young workers, within 15 years of the award of their first degree. It is named in honour of Max H. Hey (1904-1984), eminent British mineralogist.
- The Collins Medal, given since 2010, is awarded annually to a scientist who has made an outstanding contribution to Mineral Sciences. The award is named after Joseph Henry Collins (1841–1916), mineralogist and one of the founding members of the Society.
- The Eileen Guppy Technicians' Award was first announced in 2026, to recognise the contributions of technical staff and experimental officers to the disciplines of mineralogy, and earth sciences. This award is named for Eileen Guppy, who was the first female geologist appointed by the British Geological Survey.
- Mineralogical Society lectures: Hallimond Lecture, George Brown Lecture, Society Distinguished Lecturer Programme.
- Honorary membership/fellowship.
- Undergraduate student awards.

== Neumann Medal recipients ==
Source: Mineralogical Society

- 2025 Andrew Berry
- 2024 Catherine McCammon
- 2023 Luca Bindi
- 2022 Lidunka Vocadlo

== Schlumberger Medal recipients ==
Source: Mineralogical Society

- 2021 Eric Oelkers
- 2020 Geoffrey Gadd
- 2019 Sergey Krivovichev
- 2018 Jonathan Lloyd
- 2017 Maggie Cusack
- 2016 Liane G. Benning
- 2015 Simon Harley
- 2014 Barbara Maher
- 2013 Michael A. Carpenter
- 2012 Simon Redfern
- 2011 Georges Calas
- 2010 Randall R. Parrish
- 2009 John Brodholt
- 2008 Dave Rubie
- 2007 Roger Powell
- 2006 David Vaughan
- 2005 Reinhard Boehler
- 2004 Dave Manning
- 2003 Hugh O'Neill
- 2002 Christopher Hawkesworth
- 2001 Tim Holland
- 2000 Paul Nadeau
- 1999 David Price
- 1998 Ekhard Salje
- 1997 Tony Fallick
- 1996 Mike Henderson
- 1995 Paul Ribbe
- 1994 Frank Hawthorne
- 1993 Ian Parsons
- 1992 Ian Carmichael
- 1991 Bernie Wood
- 1990 Jeff Wilson

== Max Hey Medal recipients ==
Source: Mineralogical Society

- 2025 Lin Ma
- 2024 Luke Daly
- 2023 Richard Palin
- 2022 Sophie Nixon
- 2021 Anouk Borst
- 2020 Ekaterina Kiseeva
- 2019 Thomas Műller
- 2018 Oliver Lord
- 2017 Victoria Coker
- 2016 Philip Pogge von Strandmann
- 2015 Stuart J. Mills
- 2014 Chris Greenwell
- 2013 Nicholas J. Tosca and Hendrik Heinz (joint winners)
- 2012 Madeleine Humphreys
- 2011 Dan Morgan
- 2010 Takeshi Kasama
- 2009 Andrew Walker
- 2008 Diego Gatta
- 2007 Michele Warren
- 2006 A. Dominic Fortes
- 2005 Paul Hoskin
- 2004 Mark E. Hodson and Lidunka Vocadlo (joint winners)
- 2003 R.J. Harrison
- 2002 Dan J. Frost
- 2001 Andrew C. Kerr
- 2000 Ian C.W. Fitzsimons and R.W. Kent (joint winners)
- 1999 Alison Pawley
- 1998 M.R. Lee
- 1997 Jamie J. Wilkinson
- 1996 no award
- 1995 Simon C. Kohn
- 1994 Simon Redfern
- 1993 Ross John Angel

== See also ==
- Mineralogical Abstracts database
- The Clay Minerals Society
