= Victor Drits =

Russian mineralogist and crystallographer

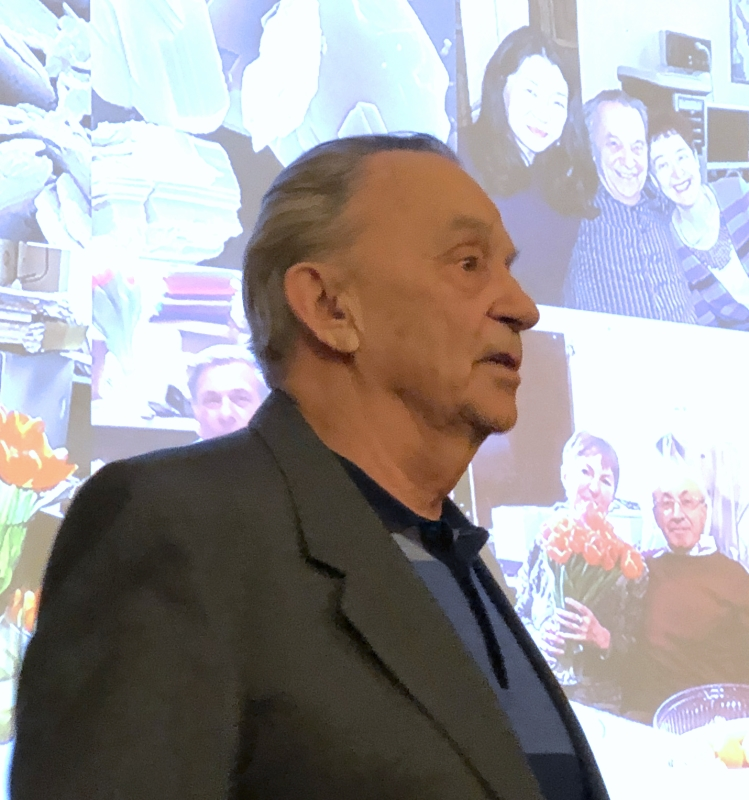
Victor Drits, 2018

Victor Drits (Russian: Виктор Анатольевич Дриц, romanized: Viktor Anatolyevich Drits; November 25, 1932 – September 10, 2025) was a Soviet and Russian geologist, mineralogist, and crystallographer, professor, deputy director of the Geological Institute of the USSR Academy of Sciences / Russian Academy of Sciences (1988–1992). He was an expert in structural mineralogy and chemistry, with special interests in clay minerals.

Victor Drits graduated from Irkutsk State University in 1955. In 1961 obtained his Ph.D. degree in Solid State Physics and Crystallography from the Institute of Crystallography, USSR Academy of Sciences, Moscow, USSR.

== Awards ==
- 1996: Bailey Distinguished Member Award, Clay Minerals Society
- Doctor Honoris Causa of the Orléans University, France
- Honorary Member of the Mineralogical Society of Great Britain and Ireland

== Monographs ==
- Рентгеноструктурный анализ смешанослойных минералов, by В. А. Дриц, Б. А. Сахаров. - Москва : Наука, 1976
- Структурное исследование минералов методами микродифракции электронов и электронной микроскопии высокого разрешения, by В. А. Дриц. - Москва : Наука, 1981
- Гипергенные окислы марганца, by Fyodor Chukhrov, А. И. Горшков, В. А. Дриц АН СССР, Ин-т геологии руд. месторождений, петрографии, минералогии и геохимии. - Москва : Наука, 1989. - 207 с.; ISBN 5-02-003198-4
- Глинистые минералы: Смектиты, смешанослойные образования, by В. А. Дриц, Anna Kossovskaya- Москва : Наука, 1990. - 211 с. - (Тр. / АН СССР, Геол. ин-т; ISSN 0002-3272).; ISBN 5-02-002128-8
- Глинистые минералы: слюды, хлориты, by В. А. Дриц, А. Г. Коссовская - Москва : Наука, 1991. - 174 с. - (Труды / АН СССР, Геол. ин-т, ISSN 0002-3272; Вып. 465).; ISBN 5-02-002160-1
- Electron Diffraction and High-Resolution Electron Microscopy of Mineral Structures, Springer, 2012
- X-Ray Diffraction by Disordered Lamellar Structures: Theory and Applications to Microdivided Silicates and Carbons, Springer, 2012
