= Ralph Early Grim =

American geologist and scientist

Ralph E. Grim
- Born: February 25, 1902; Reading, Pennsylvania, U.S.
- Died: August 19, 1989 (aged 87); Urbana, Illinois, U.S.
- Education: Yale University (BA); University of Iowa (PhD)
- Scientific career
- Fields: Geology
- Institutions: University of Illinois at Urbana–Champaign
- Thesis: The Eocene sediments of Mississippi (1931)
- Doctoral advisor: Arthur C. Trowbridge

Ralph Early Grim (February 25, 1902 – August 19, 1989) was an American geologist and scientist, often referred to as the "Father of Mineralogy" because he made many discoveries during his investigations of clay materials. He was one of the most outstanding mineralogists of his time and was well-known throughout the world in the field of clay science and technology. Grim's career spanned over 60 years and he received many honors and awards in the field of mineralogy. Some of the textbooks he wrote have been standard university textbooks in mineralogy for many years.

== Biography ==
Grim was born February 25, 1902, in Reading, Pennsylvania, to parents of Scottish and German descent. His parents were Harry W. Grim, a cigar maker, and Henrietta C. Early, daughter of noted Pennsylvanian Lutheran Minister Rev. John William Early.

Before he went to college, Grim had never even been outside of Reading, Pennsylvania where he grew up. He was the first person in his family to attend college and came from humble beginnings. At first, he was planning to attend Leigh University after high school graduation but a friend’s father took an interest in him and encouraged him to apply to Yale. He studied hard for his entrance exam and passed. Later he recalled, “To my surprise, I passed the college boards. Never will I forget the thrill when I was notified that I had been accepted at Yale”.

In 1920, Grim began to attend Yale. He paid his own way through school, waiting on tables and doing odd jobs during the summer. Some of his jobs were selling Fuller Brush products and various magazine subscriptions and working for the Pennsylvania Railroad, replacing telephone or telegraph poles along the rail line. In 1924, Grim graduated from Yale and received a B.A. in geology.

After graduating from Yale, Grim got a job as field assistant with the Illinois Geological Survey, which was his first field experience. While working there, he was assigned to help map the Aledo Quadrangle in western Illinois.

In 1931, he received his Ph.D. in geology from the University of Iowa. Grim began his professional career in 1926, as an assistant professor at the University of Mississippi as well as working as Mississippi's Assistant State Geologist. After this position, he worked from 1931 to 1945, as a petrographer at the Illinois State Geological Survey. He was later promoted to Principal Geologist of the Geological Group and became Head of the Clay Resources and Clay Mineral Technology Section. After resigning as Principal Geologist in 1948, he joined the Geology Department at the University of Illinois as a Research Professor. He retired in 1967 as Professor Emeritus.

Grim published his first textbook in 1953, called Clay Mineralogy. In 1962, he published Applied Clay Mineralogy. They were very successful and have been standard mineralogy textbooks in many universities. Additionally, he wrote and co-authored more than 125 bulletins and technical reports.

== Personal life ==
Grim was married at least three times. In 1924 he married Mary Clair "Peggy" O'Conner in Pennsylvania They did not have any children. In 1964 he married Hazel May Tucker, probably in Illinois.

Grim was married to Frances E. Grim. They loved playing golf together and travelling around the world. Grim traveled the world five different times to places that tourists did not usually go. He also loved music, gardening, travel and photography. One of his hobbies was photographing wild animals in Africa.

He died unexpectedly in Urbana, Illinois, on August 19, 1989, at the age of 87.

== Contributions to science ==
For over 60 years, Grim researched clay minerals and materials, covering almost the whole field of clay materials research. Because of this, he has been called "Father of clay mineralogy". Some of his investigations and contributions to the field of mineralogy included: differential thermal analysis; dehydration and rehydration of clay minerals; effects of heat on clay minerals; clay minerals in underclays, shales, limestones, sandstones, and lakes; clay minerals in soils and their significance; the role of clay minerals in the origin of petroleum and its recovery; and the use of clay in the practice of medicine and in medicines. His detailed study of clay micas resulted in the definition The Mineralogical Society naming one group.

== Bibliography ==
Bibliography of Grim:

1934 - Petrology of the kaolin deposits near Anna, Illinois: Economic Geology, v. 29, p. 659-670.

1935 - Petrology of the Pennsylvanian shales and noncalcareous underclays associated with Illinois coals: American Ceramic Society Bulletin, v. 14, p. 113-119,129, 134,170-176.

1936 - The Eocene sediments of Mississippi: Mississippi Geological Survey Bulletin 30, 240 p.

1937 - (and Bray, R. H., and Bradley, W. F.) The mica in argillaceous sediments: American Mineralogist, v. 22, p. 813-829.

1938 - (and Allen, V. T.) Petrology of the Pennsylvanian underclays of Illinois: Geological Society of America Bulletin, v. 49, p. 1485-1513.

1939 - Relation of the composition to the properties of clay: American Ceramic Society Journal, v. 22, p. 141-151.

1942 - (and Rowland, R. A.) Differential thermal analysis of clay minerals and other hydrous materials, Part 1: American Mineralogist, v. 27, p. 746-781; Part 2: p. 801-818.

1947 - Relation of clay mineralogy to origin and recovery of petroleum: American Association of Petroleum Geologists Bulletin, v. 31, p. 1491-1499.

1948 - (and Bradley, W. F.) Rehydration and dehydration of the clay minerals: American Mineralogist, v. 33, p. 50-59.

1949 - (and Dietz, R. S., and Bradley, W. F.) Clay mineral composition of some sediments from the Pacific Ocean off the California coast and the Gulf of California: Geological Society of America Bulletin, v. 60, p. 1785-1805.

1951 - The depositional environment of red and green shales: Journal of Sedimentary Petrology, v. 21, p. 226-232.

1953 - (and Johns, W. D., Jr.) Clay mineral investigation of sediments from the northern Gulf of Mexico, in Swineford and Plummer, eds., Clays and clay minerals: National Research Council Publication 327, p. 81-103.

1954 - (and Johns, W. D., Jr., and Bradley, W. F.) Quantitative estimations of clay minerals by diffraction methods: Journal of Sedimentary Petrology, v. 24, p. 242-251.

1955 - (and Bradley, W. F.) Structural implications of diagenesis: Geologische Rundschau, Band 43, Heft 2,15 p.

1961 - (and Kulbicki, G.) Montmorillonite—High temperature reaction and classification:

American Mineralogy, v. 46, p. 1329-1369.

1962 - Applied clay mineralogy: New York, McGraw-Hill Book Co., 422 p.

1964 - (with Wahl, F. M.) High temperature DTA and X-ray diffraction studies of reactions, in Clays and clay minerals, 12th National Conference, Atlanta, Georgia, 1963, Proceedings:New York, MacMillan Co., p. 69-81.

1968 - (and Wahl, F. M.) The kaolin deposits of Georgia and South Carolina, U.S.A., in 23rd International Geological Congress, Prague, 1968, Proceedings, Symposium 1, Genesis of kaolin deposits: Prague, Academia, p. 9-21.
