= Karl Andreas Hofmann =

German inorganic chemist (1870–1940)

- Born: 2 April 1870; Ansbach, Germany
- Died: 15 October 1940 (aged 70); Berlin-Charlottenburg, Germany
- Education: Ludwig-Maximilians-Universität München
- Known for: Hofmann clathrates Hofmann–Sand reaction
- Children: Ulrich Hofmann
- Scientific career
- Fields: solid state chemistry
- Workplaces: Ludwig-Maximilians-Universität München; University of Tübingen; Technische Universität Berlin
- Doctoral advisor: Adolf von Baeyer
- Doctoral students: Ulrich Hofmann

Karl Andreas Hofmann (2 April 1870 – 15 October 1940) was a German inorganic chemist. He is best known for his discovery of a family of clathrates which consist of a 2-D metal cyanide sheet, with every second metal also bound axially to two other ligands. These materials have been named 'Hofmann clathrates' in his honour.

== Works ==
- Lehrbuch der Anorganischen Chemie . Vieweg, Braunschweig 2nd ed. 1919 Digital edition by the University and State Library Düsseldorf
