= Timothy Holland =

British scientist

Tim Holland FRS
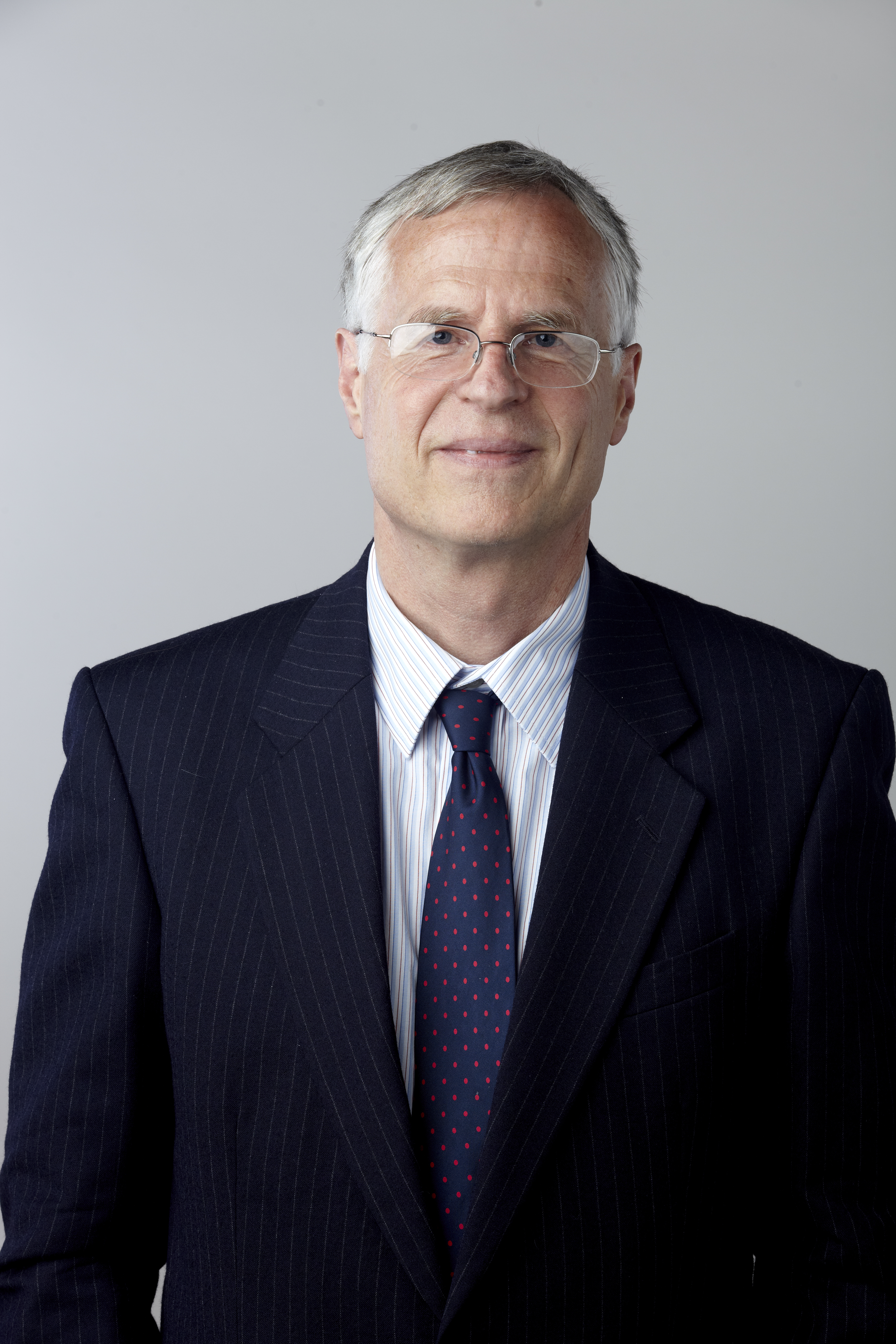
- Holland in 2014
- Born: Timothy John Barrington Holland
- Education: University of Oxford
- Awards: The Murchison Fund (1995)
- Scientific career
- Fields: Petrology
- Workplaces: University of Cambridge
- Thesis: Structural and Metamorphic Studies of Eclogites and Associated Rocks in the Central Tauern Region of the Eastern Alps (1977)
- Doctoral advisor: Stephen W. Richardson
- Website: www.esc.cam.ac.uk/directory/tim-holland

Timothy John Barrington Holland is a British petrologist who is Emeritus Professor in the Department of Earth Sciences at the University of Cambridge.

== Education ==
Holland was educated at the University of Oxford where he was awarded a Doctor of Philosophy degree in 1977 for research on eclogites in the Tauern region of the Alps supervised by Stephen W. Richardson.

== Research and career ==
Holland's research investigates the computation of petrological phase equilibria. His research has been funded by the Natural Environment Research Council (NERC).

Holland has made fundamental and enduring contributions to petrology. He was the first to show that surface rocks had been buried to over 70 km. He has worked to construct a self-consistent thermodynamic database which describes equilibria among the multi-component mineral phases important in rocks and with full propagation of errors. This work, among the most highly cited in the geosciences, now underpins most petrological research. Recent advances include the calculation of mineral assemblages and compositions as a function of composition, pressure and temperature and the thermodynamic modelling of silicate melts, critical to tectonic interpretations of deeply buried rocks.

=== Awards and honours ===
Holland was elected a Fellow of the Royal Society (FRS) in 2014. He was awarded The Murchison Fund by the Geological Society of London in 1995.
