= Mineralogical Abstracts =

- Producer: Mineralogical Society of Great Britain & Ireland
- History: 1920-2008

Access
- Providers: GeoRef
- Cost: Free

Coverage
- Disciplines: Mineralogy, crystallography, geochemistry, petrology, environmental mineralogy

Print edition
- ISSN: 0026-4601

Links
- Website: previews.georef.org/dbtw-wpd/MinAbs/minabs.htm

Mineralogical Abstracts, or MINABS Online, was a bibliographic database first published in 1920 and discontinued in 2008. It is now included in GeoRef. The database consists of more than 135,000 abstracts of journal papers. Subject coverage includes mineralogy, crystallography, geochemistry, petrology, environmental mineralogy, and related topics. From 1920 until 1957, it appeared as a supplement to The Mineralogical Magazine and Journal of the Mineralogical Society. The last editor-in-chief was Robert A. Howie, who served in this position from 1966 until Mineralogical Abstracts ceased publication in 2008. Howie oversaw the transition from a paper publication to compact disks (MinSource) and then to the online version in 2003 (MinAbs Online).
