= Clay Minerals Society =

US-based non-profit organization

- CMS Logo
- Abbreviation: CMS
- Formation: 1962
- Type: Scientific society
- Legal status: Non-profit
- Purpose: International organization devoted to the study of clays and clay minerals
- Headquarters: Chantilly, Virginia
- Location: 3635 Concorde Pkwy, Suite 500, Chantilly, VA 20151-1110
- Region served: Worldwide
- Website: www.clays.org

The Clay Minerals Society (CMS) is an international non-profit organization devoted to the study of clays and clay minerals.

== History ==
The Clay Minerals Society began as the Clay Minerals Committee of the National Academy of Sciences—National Research Council in 1952, in response to the need for a formal way to hold national clay conferences. By 1962, the Clay Minerals Committee had become strong enough to stand on its own, and The Clay Minerals Society was incorporated. From 1952 to 1964, Proceedings of the annual conferences were published. The journal Clays and Clay Minerals was first published in 1964.

== Position Statement ==
The primary purpose of The Clay Minerals Society is to stimulate research and to disseminate information relating to all aspects of clay science and technology. Through its conferences and publications, the Society offers individuals a means of following the many-sided growth of the clay sciences and of meeting fellow scientists with widely different backgrounds and interests.

== Publications and Activities ==
The primary activities of The Clay Minerals Society consist of publication of the bi-monthly journal Clays and Clay Minerals (publishing both subscription and open access articles, it is a hybrid open-access journal), organization of the annual conference, workshop, and field trip, student research grants, publication of a workshop lecture series, slide sets, and special publications, the providing of clays for research purposes through the Source Clays Repository, and publication of the society newsletter in the bimonthly Elements. Various committees within the Society deal also with such matters as regulatory issues, liaisons with other countries, and nomenclature.

== Awards ==
Awards given by the Society include Distinguished Member, the George W. Brindley Lecture, the Pioneers in Clay Science Lecture, and the Marion L. and Chrystie M. Jackson Mid-Career Clay Scientist Award. Awards are also presented for student papers and posters at the annual conference. Student research grants totaling at least $10,000 per year are awarded.

== Membership ==
The membership of The Clay Minerals Society is a diverse group because the study of clay touches upon so many fields. Members include clay mineralogists, crystallographers, physicists, chemists, geochemists, soil scientists, agronomists, ceramic scientists, civil engineers, petroleum geologists and engineers, and industrial scientists in fields involving products ranging from catalysts to cat litter. The society has about 700 members, one half of whom represent countries outside the United States.

== Annual meeting ==
The first annual meeting of The Clay Minerals Society meeting was held in 1964. In 2015, the meeting was set to be held in Edinburgh, Scotland, July 5–10. It was to be a joint meeting with European Clay Group Association, Clay Minerals UK & Ireland, and Intl. Natural Zeolite Association.

== Images of clay ==
Iron (Fe) and Aluminum (Al) rich chlorite from Strzegom pegmatite (Poland). Local name for this mineral is strzegomite. The field of view is approx. 180 microns wide. From the Images of Clay Gallery.

Together with the MinSoc's Clay Minerals Group, The Clay Minerals Society aims to create a large collection of electron micrographs of clay minerals. These images are available for free use for all nonprofit and educational uses.

== CMS Workshop Lecture Series ==
The CMS Workshop Lectures Series include Quantitative Mineral Analysis of Clays, Electron-Optical Methods in Clay Sciences, Thermal Analysis in Clay Science, Clay-Water Interface and its Rheological Implications, Computer Applications to X-ray Powder Diffraction Analysis of Clay Minerals, Layer Charge Characteristics of 2:1 Silicate Clay Minerals, and Scanning Probe Microscopy of Clay Minerals, Organic Pollutants in the Environment, Synchrotron X-ray Methods in Clay Science, Electrochemical Properties of Clays, Teaching Clay Science, Molecular Modeling of Clays and Mineral Surfaces, The Application of Vibrational Spectroscopy of Clay Minerals and Layered Double Hydroxides, Methods for Study of Microbe-Mineral Interactions, Clay-based Polymer Nano-composites (CPN), Carbon Stabilization by Clays in the Environment: Process and Characterization Methods and Clays of Yellowstone National Park, Materials and Clay Minerals, and Advanced Applications of Synchrotron Radiation in Clay Science.
