= List of fellows of Imperial College London =

This is a list of fellows of Imperial College London by year elected.

== Fellows by year ==
=== 2012 ===
- John Kerr, Baron Kerr of Kinlochard
- Martin Knight
- David Lloyd-Smith

=== 2011 ===
- Sir Peter Gershon
- Alan Howard

=== 2010 ===
- Ram Gidoomal
- Lim Chuan Poh
- Lady Wolfson of Marylebone

=== 2009 ===
- Sir Leszek Borysiewicz
- Dame Julia Higgins
- Tom Kibble
- Tony Mitcheson
- Rees Rawlings

=== 2008 ===
- Anthony G. Evans
- David Phillips

=== 2007 ===
- Trevor Phillips
- Ratan Tata
- Edmund Daukoru

=== 2006 ===
- Sir Brian Bender
- Sir John Lawton
- Frank Leppington
- Sir Christopher O'Donnell
- Mark Walport
- Victor Wynn

=== 2005 ===
- Amit Chatterjee
- Susan E. Ion
- Melvyn Myers
- Sir Colin Terry

=== 2004 ===
- Bertil Andersson
- Sir Alec Broers
- John Burland
- Sir Alan Fersht
- Keith Miller
- Robert Williamson

=== 2003 ===
- Ronald Oxburgh, Baron Oxburgh
- Sir John Pattison
- Sir Gordon Conway
- Sir Colin Dollery
- Christopher Edwards
- William Wakeham

=== 2002 ===
- Magda Czigany
- Philip Ruffles
- Gary Tanaka
- Lee Kuan Yew

=== 2001 ===
- Wilfred Corrigan
- Sir Peter J. Lachmann
- John H.D. Prescott

=== 2000 ===
- Brigitte A. Askonas
- Steven V. Ley
- David Q. Mayne

=== 1999 ===
- Eric H. Brown
- Sir Robert J. Margetts
- Peter E. Mee
- Klaus F. Roth

=== 1998 ===
- John S. Archer
- Nay Htun
- Stuart A. Lipton
- David E. Potter
- Sir Evelyn de Rothschild
- J. Trevor Stuart

=== 1997 ===
- Patrick J. Dowling
- Brian E.F. Fender
- Sir Robert May
- Joe Y. Pillay
- Sankar K. Sen

=== 1996 ===
- Bruce McA. Sayers
- Dame Margaret Turner-Warwick
- Richard Vincent, Baron Vincent of Coleshill
- Sir Peter Williams
- Lewis Wolpert

=== 1995 ===
- Sir Eric Ash
- Hon-Kwan Cheng
- John P. MacArthur
- A.K. Oppenheim
- Kenneth E. Weale

=== 1994 ===
- Sir David Cox
- Sir Ralph Robins
- Roger W. H. Sargent
- Elsie M. Widdowson
- Abdus Salam

=== 1993 ===
- Syamal Gupta
- Sara Morrison
- Olgierd C. Zienkiewicz
- Sir Geoffrey Wilkinson
- Sir Alfred Lane Beit

=== 1992 ===
- Sir Roger Bannister
- Sir John Cadogan
- Alexander King
- John H. Smith

=== 1991 ===
- Sir Alan Cottrell
- Peter A. Cox
- Leonard Wolfson, Baron Wolfson
- Sir Edward Dunlop
- Ralph Alexander Raphael

=== 1990 ===
- John F. Levy
- Sir James Lighthill
- Sir Frank Hartley
- Eric R. Laithwaite

=== 1989 ===
- Walter K. Hayman
- Sir Norman Payne
- Sir David Weatherall
- Joseph Kestin
- (Ian) Robert Maxwell

=== 1988 ===
- Ian Butterworth
- Sir Frank Cooper
- Sir Peter Hirsch
- Sir Stanley Peart
- Mostafa K. Tolba
- Soichiro Honda

=== 1987 ===
- William C. Brown
- Rilwanu Lukman
- George Porter, Lord Porter
- David D. Raphael
- Leonard Rotherham

=== 1986 ===
- Sir Geoffrey Allen
- Bernard G. Neal
- Mary Warnock, Baroness Warnock
- Sir Toby Weaver
- Dorothy E.C. Wedderburn

=== 1985 ===
- John H. Argyris
- Lord Carr
- Sir John Egan
- H. Morton Neal
- Sir Randolph Quirk
- John Sutton

=== 1984 ===
- Sir Clive Sinclair
- Sir Alec W. Skempton
- Sir Richard Southwood
- Heinrich P.K. Ursprung
- Sumant Moolgaokar

=== 1983 ===
- Anthony R. Barringer
- Sir Peter Baxendell
- Sir Hugh Ford
- William R.S. Garton
- Sir William Hawthorne

=== 1982 ===
- Shou Lum Chen
- Marc Julia
- John Stodart Kennedy
- Marston Grieg Fleming

=== 1981 ===
- Sir Alan Muir Wood
- Alfred Rene John Paul Ubbelohde
- Sir David Huddie
- Sir Sydney Martin

=== 1980 ===
- Alfred G. Gaydon
- Sir Andrew Huxley
- Reimar Lüst
- John P. Sowden
- Sir Derek Barton

=== 1979 ===
- Jean-Jacques Baron
- Peter W. Foster
- Percy Cyril Claude Garnham
- Michael John Davies
- Sir Monty Finniston

=== 1978 ===
- Sven Olving
- Sir Angus Paton
- Sir Ernst Boris Chain
- Sir Laurence Kirwan
- Sir Nevill Mott

=== 1977 ===
- William Armstrong, Baron Armstrong of Sanderstead
- Jack Wheeler Barrett
- Eric Francis Cutcliffe
- B.G. Levich
- James Dwyer McGee
- Sir Vincent Wigglesworth

=== 1976 ===
- Kenneth G. Denbigh
- Sir Kingsley Dunham
- Heinz Maier-Leibnitz
- Sir David Woodbine-Parish
- Frank Kearton, Baron Kearton

=== 1975 ===
- Leslie Scarman, Baron Scarman
- Dame Margaret Weston
- Alfred Spinks
- Harry Jones
- Victor Rothschild, 3rd Baron Rothschild

=== 1974 ===
- Sir Ralf Dahrendorf
- Sir Henry Fisher
- Sir John Mason
- Bernard Paul Gregory
- Sir Douglas Logan
- Sir Alistair Pilkington

=== 1973 ===
- Oscar V.S. Heath
- Robert W. Sarnoff
- William D. Scott
- Geoffrey Morse Binnie
- Sir Robert Lang Lickley

=== 1972 ===
- Douglas William Holder
- Sir Alan Hodgkin
- Sir Edward Playfair
- Alan Woodworth Johnson
- Brian Flowers, Baron Flowers

=== 1971 ===
- Brigadier Ralph Alger Bagnold
- Letitia Chitty
- Nicholas Kemmer
- Sir David Nicolson
- Bernard Boxall

=== 1970 ===
- R.N. Dogra
- Dennis Gabor
- Rudolph Glossop
- Sir Owen Saunders
- Sir Andrew Akiba Shonfield

=== 1969 ===
- Andre Clasen
- William Owen James
- Henry Nelson, 2nd Baron Nelson of Stafford
- Owain Westmacott Richards
- Arthur Robert Owen Williams

=== 1968 ===
- Donald H. Hey
- Stephen W.K. Morgan
- Geoffrey Emett Blackman
- Sir Harold Harding
- Sir Denning Pearson
- David Williams

=== 1967 ===
- Sir Ewart Jones
- Patrick Blackett, Lord Blackett of Chelsea
- Sir Charles Goodeve
- Sir William McCrea
- George Hoole Mitchell
- James Newby

=== 1966 ===
- Sir Derman Christopherson
- Edwin S. Hills
- James Cecil Mitcheson
- Helen Kemp Porter
- Sir Hubert Shirley-Smith
- Arnold Tustin

=== 1965 ===
- Sir Charles Cawley
- Austen Harry Albu
- Sir Andrew Bryan
- Reginald John Halsey
- Sir Gilbert Roberts

=== 1964 ===
- Sir Hugh Tett
- John Stuart Anderson
- Richard Beeching, Lord Beeching
- Sir Charles Lillicrap
- George Sail Campbell Lucas
- Walter Frederick Whittard

=== 1963 ===
- Harry Julius Emeleus
- Sir Arnold Hall
- William Hume-Rothery
- Sir Terence Morrison-Scott
- Dudley Maurice Newitt
- Roger Makins, 1st Baron Sherfield
- Constance Fligg Tipper

=== 1962 ===
- Arthur Alfred Eldridge
- George Ingle Finch
- Sir Stanley George Hooker
- Sir Owen Jones
- Reginald Leslie Smith-Rose
- Sir James Stubblefield

=== 1961 ===
- Oliver Meredith Boone Bulman
- Albert Charles Chibnall
- Thomas Graeme Nelson Haldane
- Donald Thomas Alfred Townend
- Joseph Herbert Watson

=== 1960 ===
- Cecil William Dannatt
- Frederick Gugenheim Gregory
- Roxbee Cox, Baron Kings Norton
- Geoffrey Charles Lowry
- Sir William Pugh

=== 1959 ===
- Sir Lewis Casson
- Sir Graham Cunningham
- Arthur Holmes
- Sir Christopher (Kelk) Ingold
- Ronald McKinnon-Wood
- Leonard Bessemer Pfeil

=== 1958 ===
- Henry Vincent Aird Briscoe
- Charles Alfred Bristow
- Hugh Fletcher-Moulton
- Vincent Charles Illing
- Alfred John Sutton Pippard
- Stanley Livingstone Smith

=== 1957 ===
- Sir Harold Bishop
- Edward Hindle
- Hyman Levy
- Philip Rabone
- Herbert Harold Read
- Albert Percival Rowe
- Charles Egbart Reynolds Sams

=== 1956 ===
- William Brown
- Sydney Chapman
- David Garnett
- Willis Jackson, Baron Jackson of Burnley
- James Watson Munro
- William Penney, Baron Penney
- William Francis Gray Swann

=== 1955 ===
- Eric Ashby, Baron Ashby
- Laurence Carr Hill
- John Anthony Sydney Ritson
- Sir George Paget Thomson

=== 1954 ===
- Sir David Brunt
- Henry Francis Cronin
- Sir Alfred Egerton
- Arthur Montague Holbein
- William Alfred Cyril Newman

=== 1953 ===
- Francis Howard Carr
- Arthur Clifford Hartley
- William Richard Jones
- William Nowell
- Marmaduke Tudsbery Tudsbery
- Sir Bruce Gordon White

=== 1952 ===
- Sir Leonard Bairstow
- Raymond George Hubert Clements
- Sir John Theodore Hewitt
- Robert Salmon Hutton

=== 1951 ===
- Robert Annan
- Gordon Maskew Fair
- Sir Frederick Handley-Page
- Sir Ian Heilbron
- Edward Duffield McDermott
- Stanley Robson

=== 1950 ===
- Sir George Dyson
- Jeremy Clarke Hunsaker
- Sir Richard Southwell
- Sir Henry Steward

=== 1949 ===
- Karl Taylor Compton
- Harold Johann Thomas Ellingham
- Sir Henry McMahon
- Thomas Arthur Rickard
- William Selkirk

=== 1948 ===
- Alfred Jefferson Brett
- Rev. James Owen Hannay
- John Johnson
- Edward Frank Dalby Witchell

=== 1947 ===
- Warren Royal Dawson
- Sir Arthur Hall
- Sir James Pringle

=== 1946 ===
- Vernon Herbert Blackman
- Alexander Gow
- Walter T. Prideaux
- Sir Evelyn Shaw
- Sir John Edward Thornycroft
- Sir Gilbert Walker
- Martha Annie Whiteley

=== 1945 ===
- Charles Samuel Garland
- Percy Good
- Sir Andrew McCance
- Robert Strutt, the 4th Barron Rayleigh
- Sir Pierre van Ryneveld
- Samuel John Truscott
- William Whitehead Watts
- Alfred North Whitehead
- Harry Egerton Wimperis

=== 1944 ===
- Lord Falmouth
- William Palmer Wynne

=== 1943 ===
- Herbert George Wells
- Frank Twyman
- Frederick Charles Lea
- James Gunson Lawn
- Frederick William Lanchester

=== 1942 ===
- Sir Henry (Thomas) Tizard

=== 1941 ===
- Sydney William Smith

=== 1939 ===
- Edward Frankland Armstrong
- Oscar Faber
- Thomas Turner

=== 1937 ===
- Charles Vickery Drysdale
- Sir Albert Howard
- Edward Thomas McCarthy
- Sir Frank Smith

=== 1935 ===
- Alfred Fowler

=== 1934 ===
- William Eccles
- Conwy Lloyd Morgan
- William Johnson Sollas

=== 1933 ===
- Percy Faraday Frankland
- Henry Louis
- Sir Basil Mott
- Alfred Edwin Howard Tutton

=== 1932 ===
- Sir Charles Boys
- William Frecheville
- Sir Ralph Freeman
- Sir Thomas Holland
- Herbert Alfred Humphrey
- Richard Dixon Oldham
- Sir William (Jackson) Pope
- James Whitehead
- Sir Herbert Wright

== See also ==
- President and Rector of Imperial College London
- List of Nobel laureates affiliated with Imperial College London
