= Eileen Guppy =

British geologist

- Born: Eileen Mary Guppy; 24 May 1903
- Died: 8 March 1980 (aged 76)
- Education: Bedford College, London (BSc)
- Awards: MBE
- Scientific career
- Fields: Geology, Petrology, Analytical Chemistry
- Workplaces: British Geological Survey

Eileen Mary Guppy MBE (24 May 1903 – 8 March 1980) was a British geologist, petrologist, and analytical chemist. She was the first female geologist appointed to the scientific staff of the Geological Survey of Great Britain. In 1966, after 39 years of service, Guppy became the first female staff member of the survey to be appointed MBE.

== Education and early career ==
Guppy began studying at Bedford College in London in 1920. She graduated with honours in 1923 with a Bachelor of Science in Geology. For the next two years, she worked as a research assistant to Leonard Hawkes at Bedford College and published the paper A Composite Dyke from Eastern Iceland in the Quarterly Journal of the Geological Society of London. The article overviewed an Icelandic dyke and its composition, making insightful observations about its makeup.

== Geological Survey career ==
In 1927, Guppy was appointed to the petrological department at the Geological Survey of Great Britain, making her one of two women with geology degrees to be appointed as technical assistants in that institution. Despite her qualifications, she spent many years working in roles subordinate to her male counterparts due in large part to the prevalent gender biases at the time.

In 1935, Guppy organised the move of the petrological rock and thin section collections from the old Museum of Practical Geology on Jermyn Street to the new Geological Museum on Exhibition Road, London.

During World War II, many women took on roles left absent by men who had been called up for military service. In 1943, Guppy was promoted to the rank of assistant geologist, becoming the first female geology graduate to be appointed to the scientific staff of the Survey. After the war ended in 1945, she returned to her earlier position of senior experimental officer because it was deemed that she had fulfilled her wartime role. She worked as a scientific assistant to the Survey's directors Sir William Pugh and Sir James Stubblefield until 1966.

Guppy later became a secretary for the new Atomic Energy Division, and worked with inspectors from the Public Record Office between 1963 and 1965 evaluating older records from the British Geological Survey and Museum. On her retirement in 1966, Guppy was appointed MBE for her service of more than 39 years. She was the first female member of staff to be recognized in this way. During 43-year-long career, she was only officially recognized as a geologist for three of them. Few of her contributions to various British Geological Survey publications have credit attributed to her.

== Publications ==
Guppy published results of her work in 1924 under the title of A Composite Dyke from Eastern Iceland, co-authored with geologist Leonard Hawkes. She published two editions of Chemical Analysis of Igneous Rocks, Metamorphic Rocks and Minerals in 1931 and 1956. While working for the Director Sir John Flett, she made a significant contribution to the book The First Hundred Years of the Geological Survey of Great Britain, published in 1937. Her work listed the contributing staff on the Geological Survey of Great Britain from 1835 to 1935. She published the book Rock Wool with James Phemister in 1945, with a second edition released in 1949.

=== A Composite Dyke from Eastern Iceland ===
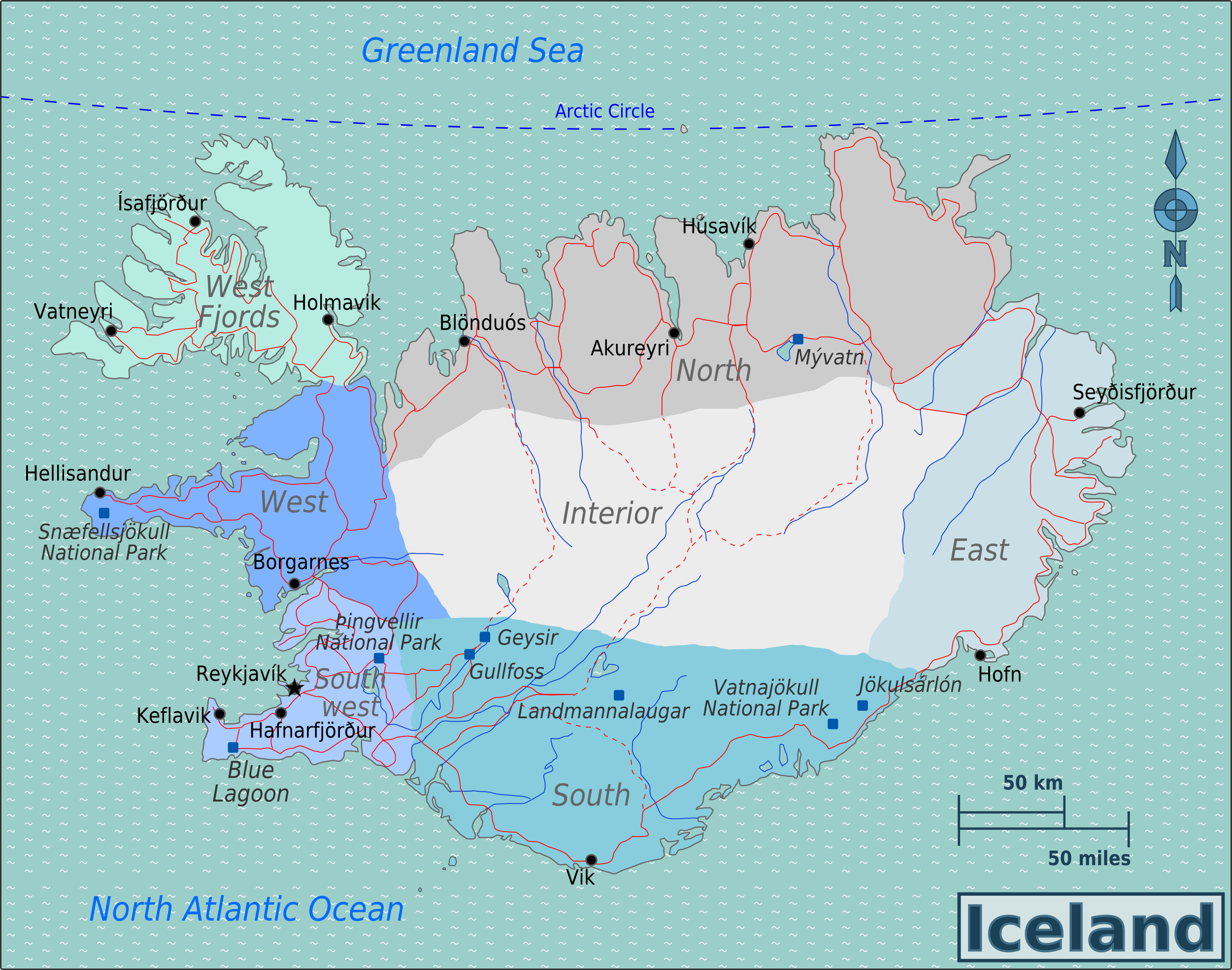
A map demonstrating where Guppy conducted her research.

With geologist Leonard Hawkes, Guppy conducted a case study of the composite dykes in eastern Iceland in 1924. While Hawkes conducted the field work, Guppy played a crucial role in analysing and interpreting the commonly occurring composite dykes in the tertiary plateau-basalt series of the respective area studied. The overruling findings are as follows: the exposed dyke is seen to be composed of basic and acidic rocks, as well as seven members - the dolerites alternating in the quartz-porphyries. The studied dyke is exposed in cliff-section at Hökulvikurgil, Breithdal. Guppy and Hawkes deciphered the sequence of intrusions in the composite dyke, analysed the origin of quartz and felspar-xenocrysts in the dolerites, and described the mafic inclusions in the acidic rocks.

== Personal life ==
In the early 20th century, British institutions mandated that females be single or widowed to be employed; if they decided to marry or remarry, they had to resign. This meant that she had to stay unmarried to retain her position working for the Geological Survey of Great Britain. In 1975 this law changed with the introduction of the Sex Discrimination Act 1975.

Little is known of Guppy's personal life, beyond her career as a geologist, petrologist, and analytical chemist.

== Impact ==
Guppy was the first female geologist to be appointed to the scientific staff of the British Geological Survey, paving the way for other women in the institution. Following her retirement, Guppy was also the first woman to receive an MBE in 1966, for her 39 years of contributions which made her a significant figure in feminist history.

Her career was part of a large-scale societal shift in Western attitudes toward legitimizing female scientists which took place during the 1920-30s. This shift was due in part to the founding of female post-secondary institutions a few decades prior, such as Bedford College where Guppy attended, vacancies in scientific positions as a result of WWII, and the first-wave feminist movement, which prompted organizations to step towards accepting women as equals in the workplace.

In 2026, Guppy was formally recognised by the Mineralogical Society of Great Britain and Ireland, who named the 'Eileen Guppy Technicians' Award' in her honour, in recognition of the service provided by technical staff and experimental officers to the disciplines of mineralogy, and earth sciences.

== See also ==
- Timeline of women in science
- British Geological Survey
