= Vincent Charles Illing =

- Born: September 24, 1890; Jalandhar, British India
- Died: May 16, 1969 (aged 78)
- Scientific career
- Fields: Geology

Vincent Charles Illing FRS (24 September 1890 – 16 May 1969) was a geologist at the Royal School of Mines, London where he specialized in petroleum geology.

Illing was born in Jalandhar in India to Annie Payton and Thomas Illing who served in the army. He was schooled there before moving to Malta where his father was posted. His father retired to England and they lived in Nuneaton where he, aged thirteen, went to the King Edward VI Grammar School. He received a scholarship and went to Sidney Sussex College, Cambridge. He initially considered entering the Indian Civil Service but was drawn into science by the lectures of W.G. Fearnsides. He received a Harkness Scholarship, and while an undergraduate, he examined the Cambrian trilobites at Hartshill near his home. He joined as a demonstrated in 1913 at the Imperial College under W. W. Watts. He published in 1915 on the Paradoxian Fauna of the Stockingford Shales. Illing was made demonstrator in petroleum in 1914 and from 1917 he published on his surveys of British oil shales. He married Frances Jean Leslie in 1919 and went to Trinidad where Illing worked briefly for Naparima oil company. He used core samples and examined foraminifera and heavy minerals to delineate the geology of the region. Illing worked again in South America, in Venezuela from 1928 and in other parts of the world, particularly during World War II when he was involved in measures to ensure petroleum supplies to Britain. His son Leslie V. Illing also became a geologist.

Illing was awarded the Murchison Medal of the Geological Society of London in 1944, and was elected to the Fellowship of the Royal Society in 1945.
