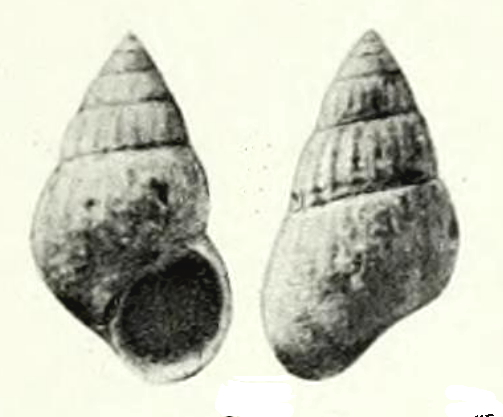
- Shell of Alvania erecta (holotype)

Scientific classification
- Kingdom: Animalia
- Phylum: Mollusca
- Class: Gastropoda
- Subclass: Caenogastropoda
- Order: Littorinimorpha
- Superfamily: Rissooidea
- Family: Rissoidae
- Genus: Alvania
- Species: †A. erecta

Binomial name
- †Alvania erecta Harmer, 1920

= Alvania erecta =

Species of gastropod

Alvania erecta is an extinct species of minute sea snail, a marine gastropod mollusc or micromollusk in the family Rissoidae.

== Description ==
The length of the shell is 2 mm (0.079 in), and its diameter is 1 mm (0.039 in).

(Original description) The minute shell is ovate-conical. It contains 6 convex whorls. The body whorl is rather tumid and much the largest. The shell is ornamented by numerous fine longitudinal ribs which die out at the periphery, and by delicate spiral lines which become somewhat stronger below it. The suture is distinct and slightly channelled, with a spiral line immediately above it. The spire is short, regularly diminishing in size towards an acute point. The oval aperture is rather small. The outer lip is gently rounded, incurved above and not much expanded. The inner lip is somewhat reflected. The peristome is continuous.

== Distribution ==
Fossils of this species were found in late Pliocene strata at St. Erth, Cornwall, Great Britain.
