= Alice Buxton Winnicott =

English research scientist, painter and ceramicist

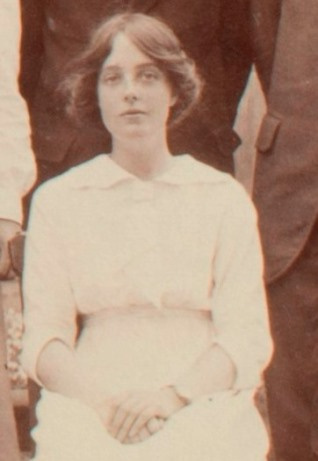
- c. 1914
- Born: Alice Buxton Taylor; 1891; Claverdon, England
- Died: 1969 (aged 77–78)
- Education: Newnham College
- Spouse: Donald Winnicott (1923–1949)

Alice Buxton Winnicott née Taylor (1891 – 1969) was an English research scientist, painter and ceramicist. Her Upchurch Pottery manufactured Claverdon tableware for Heal's. She was the first wife of the paediatrician and psychoanalyst, D.W. Winnicott.

== Life ==
Alice Buxton Taylor was born in 1891, in Claverdon, Warwickshire, the second of five accomplished children. Her father was John William Taylor (1851–1910) who was a professor of gynaecology at the University of Birmingham. Alice's mother, Florence Maberly Buxton (1856–1934), a teacher before she married, had educated all her children at home in their early years. Alice went on to the King Edward VI High School for Girls in Birmingham. In 1912 Alice went up to Cambridge, following her mother and older sister Mary into Newnham College (1912–1915), studying the Natural Sciences Tripos. While she was in Cambridge she joined the geological Sedgwick Club.

After her time at Cambridge, Taylor spent five years (1916–1920) at the National Physical Laboratory in Teddington, carrying out research into ceramics and optical glass, ‘where, for most of the time, I was the only woman research student’. She references the work as being ‘in connection with the urgent needs of Government and Industry’ and refers to the work as ‘Refractorics’, testing materials under very high temperatures and casting optical glass pots under pressure.

Her paper entitled ‘The casting of pots for use in experimental work on optical glass’ appears in the Transactions of the Society of Glass Technology, 1920 Vol. 4.

In 1923 she married the newly qualified doctor, Donald Winnicott, on 7 July 1923 in St Mary's Church, Frensham. She was thirty one at the time and appears to have spent her time, on leaving the National Physical Laboratory and prior to meeting Donald, in the company of artists. Her entry in Artists in Britain since 1945. Vol 2 (Buckman, 2006) states that she studied and worked with important artists of the time as she studied in Richmond, Kingston, Wimbledon and Central School of Art and Design. She was instrumental in the foundation of several art groups including the New Kingston Group of painters.

Alice's "severe psychological difficulties" are documented in a number of Winnicott's biographies, but the limitations of this description belie her achievements. Although Winnicott arranged for his wife to have psychoanalysis with Dr Clifford Scott, he also had long term psychoanalysis himself. Those who remember Alice, refer to her as 'other worldly' or 'fey.' Biographers of Donald Winnicott offer more detail of the difficulties encountered through the Winnicotts' psychoanalysis. Her husband undertook a first psychoanalysis with James Strachey. Strachey discussed Winnicott's case unethically with his wife Alix Strachey, who was also a Newnham alumna. According to Strachey's report Winnicott's marriage was affected by his sexual anxieties. The problem of this emerging into the public domain is a major professional and ethical breach of patient confidentiality and subsequent repetition merely compounds the original breach.

During the Winnicott's early years of marriage prior to World War II, Alice supported Winnicott in his work, whilst continuing her own career as a painter, sculptor and potter. They also had shared interests and friendships with notable people of the period, including Helen and Jim (H.S.) Ede, an Assistant Keeper at the Tate Gallery in the early 1930s. Letters show the affection between Alice and Donald and they retained a correspondence after their divorce.

In the mid-1930s she bought the existing Upchurch Pottery in Rainham, Kent, and there she manufactured her Claverdon tableware. named after her birthplace and sold in Heal's, on the Tottenham Court Road, London.

Her work was exhibited at the Royal Academy and at the Royal Cambridge Academy and in 1939 she showed her work in the South West Art Society 50th Anniversary Exhibition. Her bronze sculpture of T. E. Lawrence is in the National Library of Wales.

The couple were divorced in 1949 and two years later Donald Winnicott married Clare Britton on 28 December 1951.

In the final years of her life, Winnicott moved to New Quay in Cardiganshire, South Wales, to be with her younger sister. She had a small studio and continued her work as an artist until her death in 1969.

== Legacy ==
Winnicott left a number of paintings in notable collections including at Plymouth City Council and her alma mater. Her work will remain in copyright until 2040, but images of her paintings are not available.
