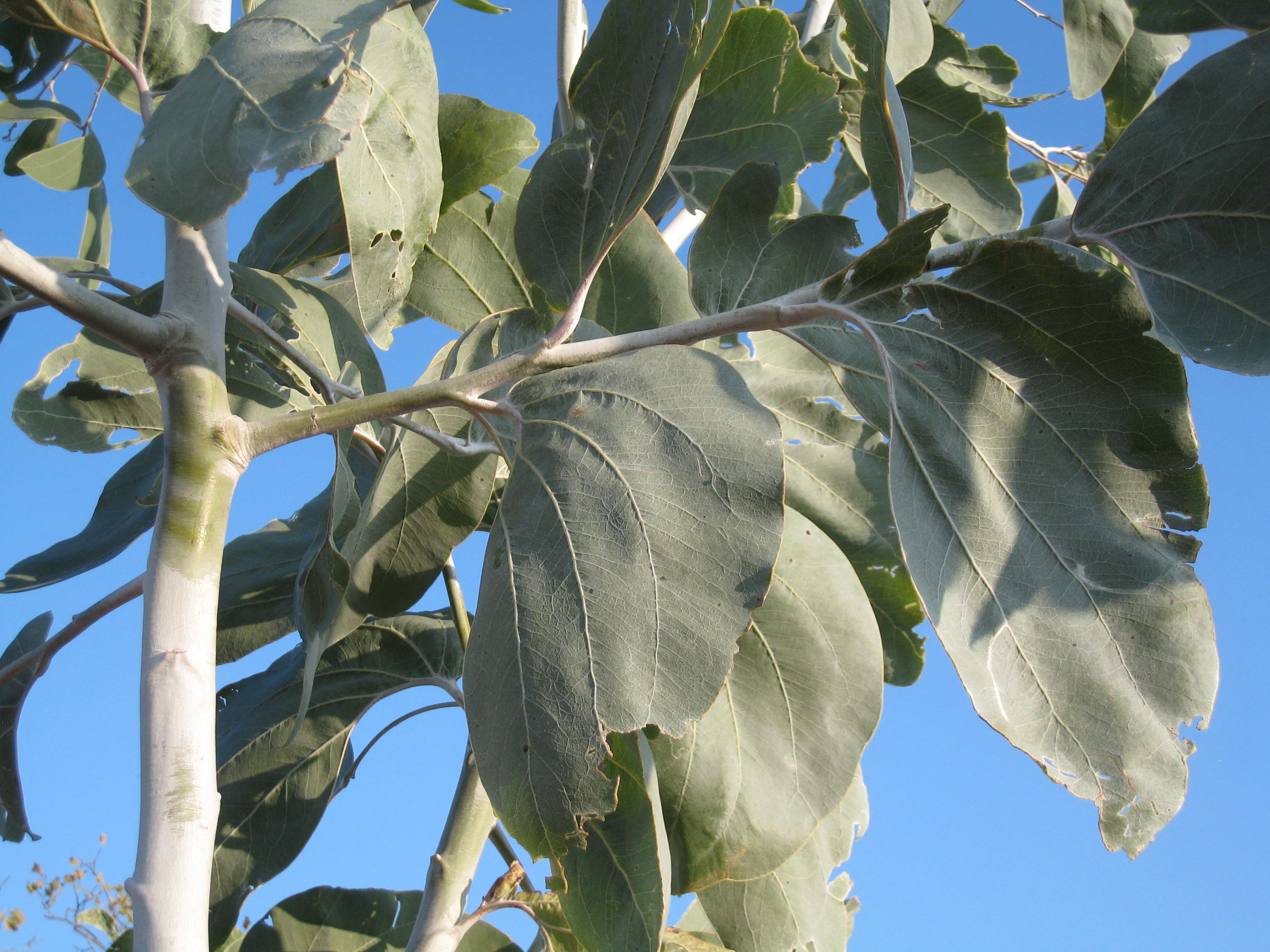

Scientific classification
- Kingdom: Plantae
- Clade: Tracheophytes
- Clade: Angiosperms
- Clade: Eudicots
- Clade: Rosids
- Order: Fabales
- Family: Fabaceae
- Subfamily: Caesalpinioideae
- Clade: Mimosoid clade
- Genus: Acacia
- Species: A. dunnii

Binomial name
- Acacia dunnii Turrill
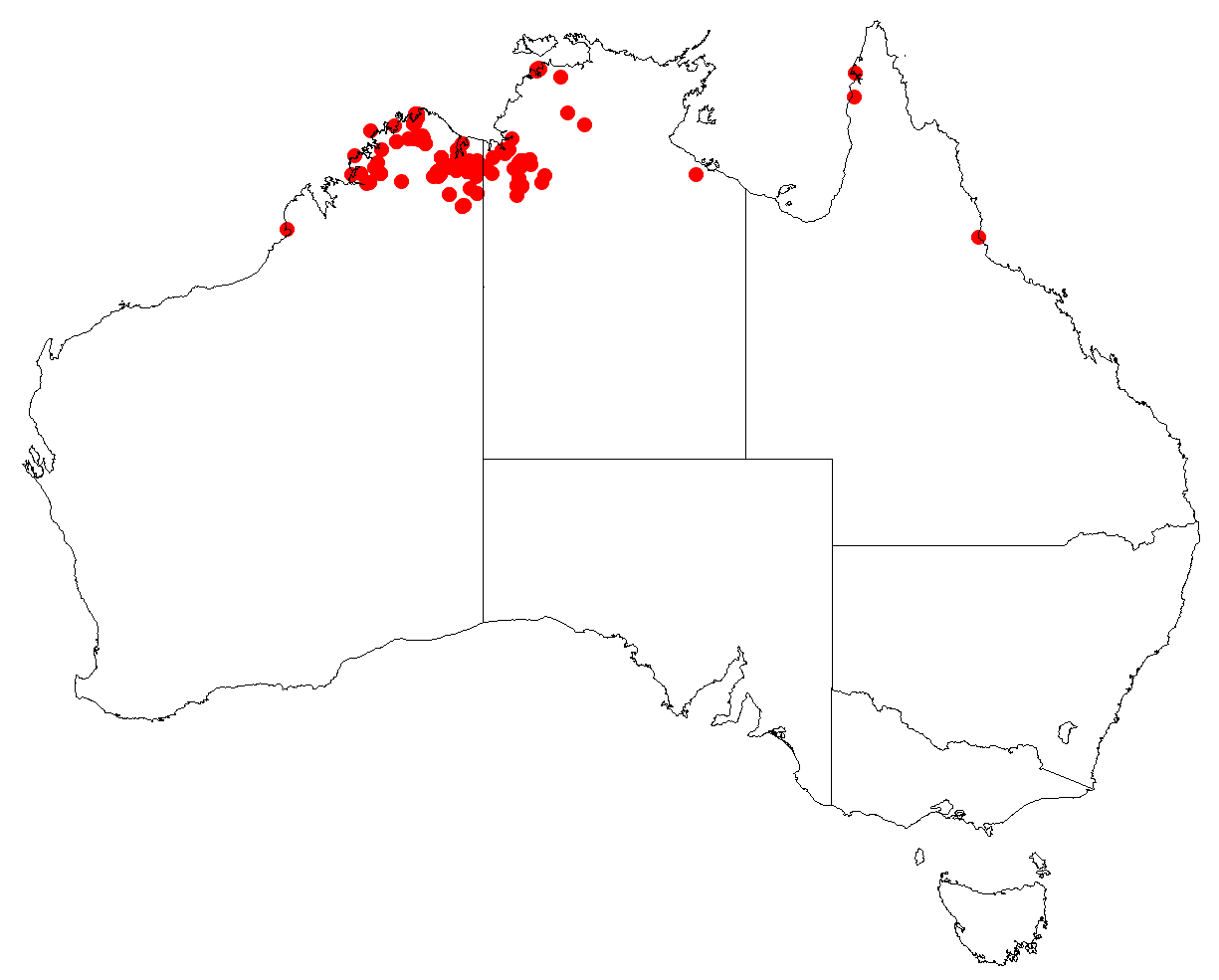
- Occurrence data from AVH

Synonyms
- Acacia sericata var. dunnii Maiden; Racosperma dunnii (Turrill) Pedley

= Acacia dunnii =

Elephant ear wattle

Species of legume

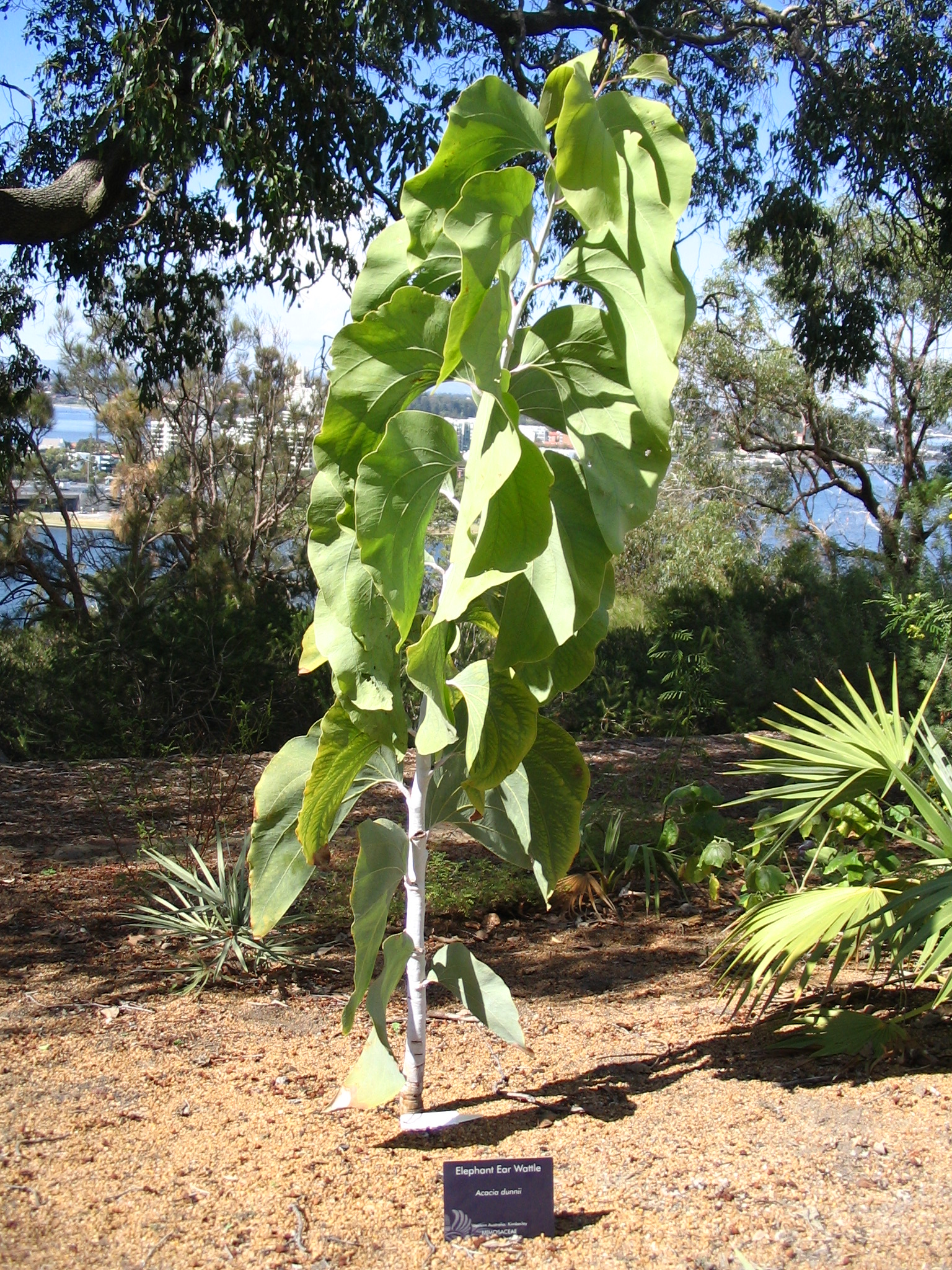
Habit in Kings Park

Acacia dunnii, commonly known as Dunn's wattle or elephant ear wattle is a species of flowering plant in the family Fabaceae and is endemic to northern Australia. It is a shrub or tree covered with a fine, white powdery bloom, elliptic to egg-shaped phyllodes, spherical heads of golden yellow flowers and narrowly oblong, more or less woody pods. The Jamindjung, Ngaliwurru people and Nungali people know the plant as bawaya, and the Ngarinyman as barrawi.

== Description ==
Acacia dunnii is an erect shrub or small tree that typically grows to 1.5–6 m (4 ft 11 in – 19 ft 8 in) high, 2–4 m (6 ft 7 in – 13 ft 1 in) wide, and is covered with a white, powdery bloom. The phyllodes are elliptic to egg-shaped, shallowly sickle-shaped, 120–420 mm (4.7–16.5 in) long and 60–175 mm (2.4–6.9 in) wide, wavy, leathery and glabrous with four or five prominent veins. The flowers are borne in spherical heads in panicles 110–500 mm (4.3–19.7 in) long on peduncles 8–20 mm (0.31–0.79 in) long, each head 6–8 mm (0.24–0.31 in) in diameter with 50 to 85 golden yellow flowers. Flowering occurs from January to June and the pods are narrowly oblong, more or less woody, up to 170 mm (6.7 in) long and 20–40 mm (0.79–1.57 in) wide. The seeds are broadly elliptic to oblong, 9–12 mm (0.35–0.47 in) long and brown with an aril on the end.

== Taxonomy ==
Acacia dunnii was first formally described in 1922 by William Bertram Turrill in the Bulletin of Miscellaneous Information from "fissure in hard quartzite rock near Victoria River, Northern Territory" in 1922. The specific epithet (dunnii) honours Edward John Dunn, the Victorian government geologist.

Turrill cited Acacia sericata var. dunnii as a synonym of A. dunnii.

== Distribution and habitat ==
Dunn's wattle grows in skeletal soils over sandstone, basalt or quartzite on ridges and stony hills in the Central Kimberley, Northern Kimberley, Ord Victoria Plain and Victoria Bonaparte bioregions of Western Australia and the Northern Territory.

== Conservation status ==
Acacia dunnii is listed as "not threatened" by the Government of Western Australia Department of Biodiversity, Conservation and Attractions and as of "least concern" under the Northern Territory Government Northern Territory Parks and Wildlife Conservation Act.

== See also ==
- List of Acacia species
