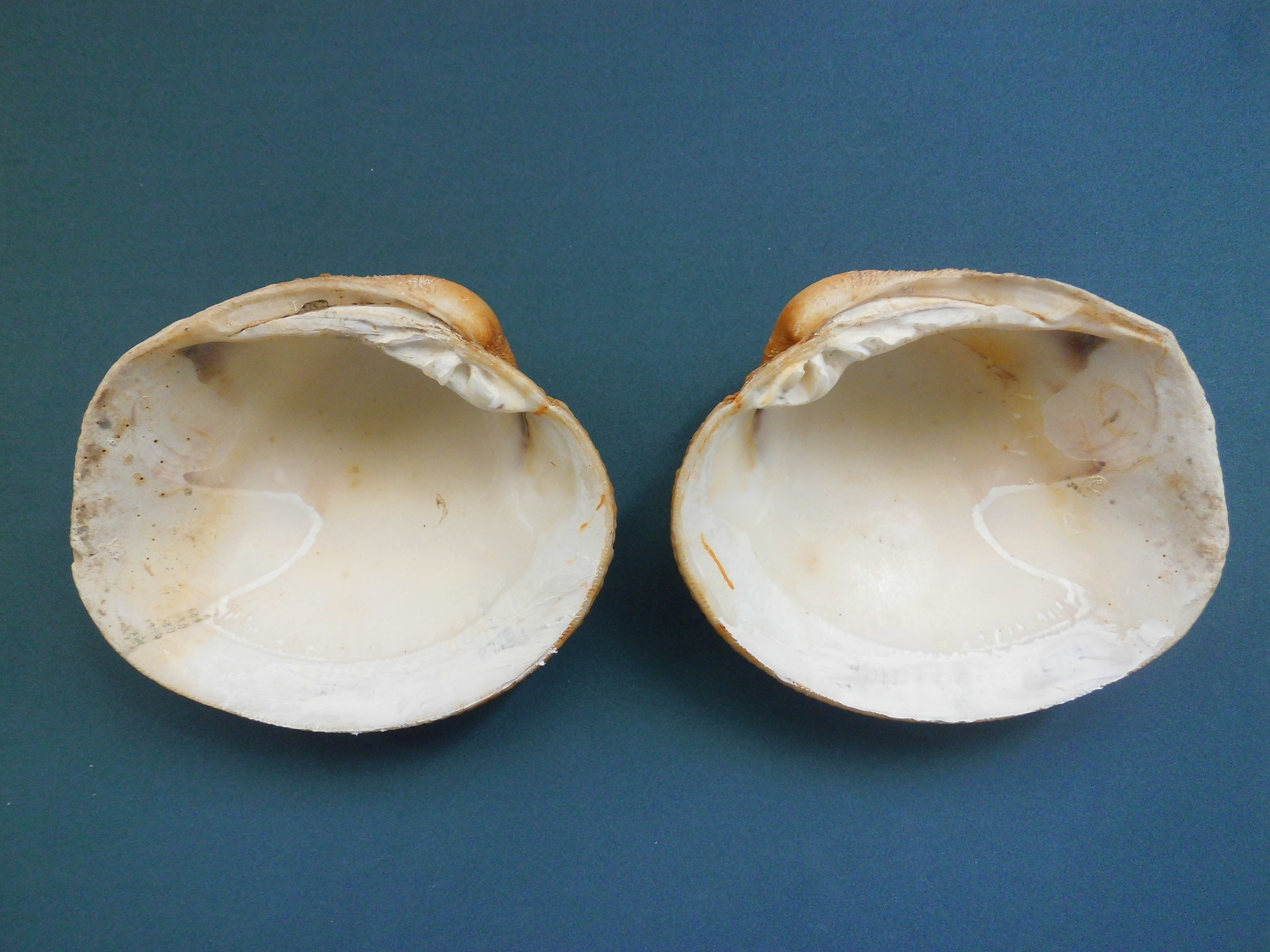
- The shells of Periglypta listeri

Scientific classification
- Kingdom: Animalia
- Phylum: Mollusca
- Class: Bivalvia
- Order: Venerida
- Superfamily: Veneroidea
- Family: Veneridae
- Genus: Periglypta; Jukes-Browne, 1914

Type species
- Venus puerpera Linnaeus, 1771

Species
- See text

Synonyms
- Antigona (Periglypta) Jukes-Browne, 1914 (original rank); Cytherea Röding, 1798 (Invalid: junior homonym of Cytherea Fabricius, 1794 [Diptera])

= Periglypta =

Periglypta Temporal range: 48.6–0.012 Ma

Genus of bivalves

Periglypta is a genus of bivalves in the subfamily Venerinae of the family Veneridae.

== Species ==
According to the World Register of Marine Species, this genus has eight extant species. There are nine fossil species listed in Fossilworks, five of which are not extant:

- †Periglypta caesarina (W.H. Dall, 1903)
- †Periglypta caribbeana Anderson, 1927
- Periglypta corbis (Lamarck, 1818)
- Periglypta crispata (Deshayes, 1854)
- Periglypta exclathrata (Sacco, 1900)
- Periglypta listeri (J.E. Gray, 1838) – Princess Venus clam
- Periglypta multicostata (G. B. Sowerby I, 1835)
- Periglypta puerpera (Linnaeus, 1771)
- Periglypta reticulata (Linnaeus, 1758)
- †Periglypta tamiamensis A.A. Olsson & R.E. Petit, 1964
- †Periglypta tarquinia (W.H. Dall, 1900)
- Periglypta valentichscotti Thach, 2021
- †Periglypta weegeeree Darragh & Kendrick, 2010

In addition, Markus Huber (2010) mentioned that Periglypta and Antigona are synonyms, but Chen et al. (2011) rejected this opinion.
