= Whittard =

Whittard is a surname. Notable people with the surname include:

- Walter Frederick Whittard (1902–1966), professor of geology

== See also ==
- Whittard of Chelsea, international retailer of coffee, tea, and various items
