= William Quarrier Kennedy =

Scottish geologist

William Quarrier Kennedy FRS FRSE FGS (30 November 1903 – 13 March 1979) was a Scottish geologist. He specialised in the geology of Scotland and Africa. In authorship he is usually referred to as W. Q. Kennedy.

== Early life and education ==
Kennedy was born on 30 November 1903 at the William Quarrier School for Orphans in Bridge of Weir, Renfrewshire, where his father, John Gordon Kennedy, was headmaster. He was named after the school's founder. He was educated at his father's school alongside the orphans then at Glasgow High School. He studied agriculture at Glasgow University, graduating BSc in 1926, then did a further degree in geology, graduating BSc in 1927. The latter was under John Walter Gregory. He then undertook further postgraduate studies in geology under Paul Niggli in Zürich.

== Academic career ==
From 1928 Kennedy worked on the Geological Survey of Great Britain under John Horne and Ben Peach. In 1945 he left the Geological Survey team to take on the role of Professor of Geology at the University of Leeds. He led the 1952 British Museum Ruwenzori expedition and from 1955 he took on an additional role as Director of the Institute of African Geology. His students at Leeds included Ian Graham Gass.

In 1946 he was the first to deduce the major horizontal shift in the Great Glen Fault. In 1949 the Geological Society of London awarded him the Bigsby Medal and in 1967 he won the Lyell Medal.

In 1948 he was elected a Fellow of the Royal Society of Edinburgh. His proposers were Murray Macgregor, Herbert Harold Read, David Haldane, and Archibald MacGregor. He was elected a Fellow of the Royal Society in 1949.

He retired in 1967 and died at 2 Stone Rings Lane in Harrogate on 13 March 1979.

== Family ==
In 1933 he married Elizabeth Jane Lawson McCubbin, having three children. They divorced in 1962 and he then married Sylvia Margaret Greeves, daughter of John Greeves. He had two children by his second marriage.

== Publications ==
- The Determination of Feldspars in Thin Section (1933)
- African Magmatism and Tectonics (1970)
