= Brammall =

Brammall is a surname. Notable people with the surname include:

- Alfred Brammall, British geologist, mineralogist, and petrologist
- Bertha Southey Brammall, Australian writer
- Jack Brammall, English-American actor
- Patrick Brammall, Australian actor and writer
