= William George Fearnsides =

British geologist

- Born: 10 November 1879; Horbury, Yorkshire
- Died: 15 May 1968 (aged 88); Sheffield
- Education: Sidney Sussex College, Cambridge (B.A., 1901)
- Known for: Geology in the service of man (1944)
- Awards: Murchison Medal (1932); FRS (1932)
- Scientific career
- Workplaces: University of Cambridge; University of Sheffield

William George Fearnsides FRS (1879–1968) was a British geologist who worked at the University of Cambridge from 1904 to 1913, and was professor of geology at the University of Sheffield from 1913 to 1945.

== Early life ==
Fearnsides, who was later known as 'Bones' by his contemporaries, was born in Horbury, Yorkshire. He was the eldest son of Joshua and Maria Fearnsides, and he had two younger siblings who pre-deceased him; Edwin Greaves who died in 1919 in a boating accident, and Marguerite, who died in 1904.

Fearnsides went to school at the Wheelwright Grammar School, Dewsbury, and won a scholarship to the University of Cambridge in 1895. He went to Sidney Sussex College, Cambridge to study Natural Sciences in 1897, and graduated with a first class degree in geology in 1901. After leaving Cambridge, he took up an apprenticeship with Westinghouse Electric Corporation in Pittsburgh, but left after an altercation, and eventually made his way back to England on a cattle boat. Fearnsides returned to Cambridge, where he was elected a fellow of Sidney Sussex college in 1904, appointed college lecturer in 1908, and became university demonstrator in petrology in 1909. During this time, Fearnsides worked extensively on the Lower Palaeozoic rocks of Wales, northern England and Scandinavia, publishing papers with John E Marr, Gertrude Elles and Bernard Smith. In 1913, Fearnsides was appointed to the new Sorby professorship of geology at the University of Sheffield, a post he held until retirement in 1945. In Sheffield, Fearnsides extended his work on metal alloys, and metallography, and recognised the applications of these approaches to the study of metamorphic rocks, and did much to demonstrate the value of geology to society.

== Awards and recognition ==
Fearnsides was awarded the Murchison Medal of the Geological Society of London in 1932, and elected Fellow of the Royal Society in the same year. He served as President of the Geological Society of London from 1943 to 1945, and was elected to honorary fellowship of Sidney Sussex college in 1946.

== Key publications ==
In addition to his academic publications, Fearnsides published a popular Pelican book with Oliver Bulman in 1944, 'Geology in the service of man'; this went through several reprints and revised editions.

== Family ==
In 1911, Fearnsides married Beatrix Mary Adelaide Watts, daughter of W W Watts. They had two daughters, Marguerite and Elizabeth. Elizabeth served in the Auxiliary Territorial Service in North Africa and Italy, and died in a road traffic accident near Genoa in 1945.
