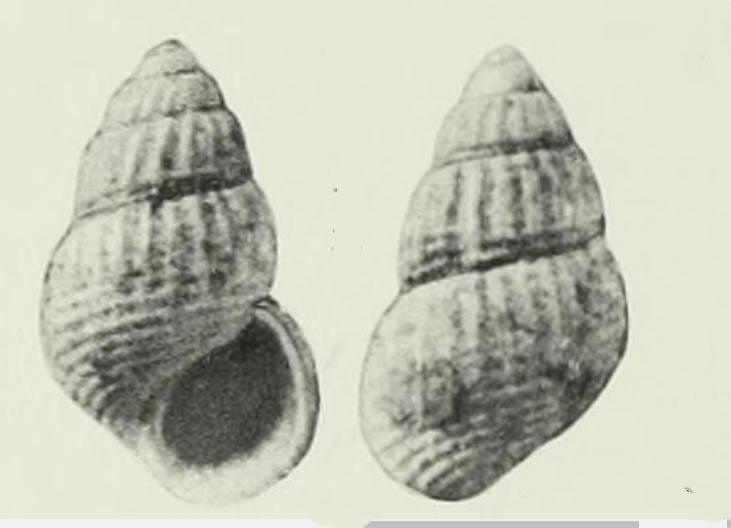
- Shell of Alvania dubiosa (holotype)

Scientific classification
- Kingdom: Animalia
- Phylum: Mollusca
- Class: Gastropoda
- Subclass: Caenogastropoda
- Order: Littorinimorpha
- Family: Rissoidae
- Genus: Alvania
- Species: †A. dubiosa

Binomial name
- †Alvania dubiosa Harmer, 1920

= Alvania dubiosa =

Species of gastropod

Alvania dubiosa is an extinct species of minute sea snail, a marine gastropod mollusc or micromollusk in the family Rissoidae.

== Description ==
The length of the shell attains 3 mm, its diameter 2 mm.

(Original description) The minute, solid shell is ovate-conical. It contains 5 convex whorls. The body whorl is tumid and measures about two-thirds the total length. The three lower whorls are ornamented by well-marked longitudinal ribs, nearly straight, which die out or are cut off by strong spiral ridges, continuous to the base. The upper whorls are without sculpture. The spire is turreted, decreasing in size, compressed above, ending in a blunt rounded point. The suture is deep. The aperture is oval, rather short and expanded below. The outer and inner lip are thickened.

== Distribution ==
Fossils of this species were found in late Pliocene strata at St. Erth, Cornwall, Great Britain.
