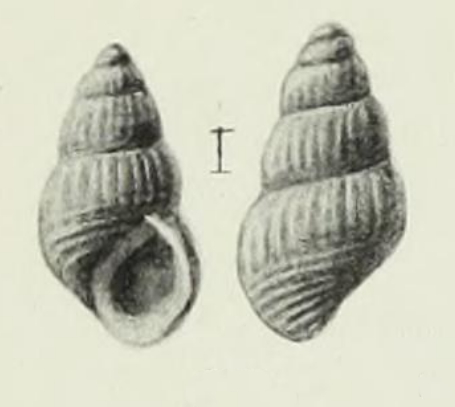
- Shell of Alvania densecostata (holotype)

Scientific classification
- Kingdom: Animalia
- Phylum: Mollusca
- Class: Gastropoda
- Subclass: Caenogastropoda
- Order: Littorinimorpha
- Family: Rissoidae
- Genus: Alvania
- Species: †A. densecostata

Binomial name
- †Alvania densecostata Harmer, 1920

Synonyms
- † Rissoa densecostata A. Bell, 1893

= Alvania densecostata =

Species of gastropod

Alvania densecostata is an extinct species of minute sea snail, a marine gastropod mollusc or micromollusk in the family Rissoidae.

== Description ==
The length of the shell attains 3 mm, its diameter 1 mm.

(Original description) The solid, minute shell is elongate-turreted. The whorls are convex. They are ornamented by numerous fine, nearly straight ribs, crowded closely together, intersected by spiral striae which become stronger and more prominent below the periphery.

== Distribution ==
Fossils of this species were found in late Pliocene strata at St. Erth, Cornwall, Great Britain.
