= Clifford Scott =

Clifford Scott may refer to:

- Clifford Scott (musician) (1928–1993), American saxophonist and flautist
- Clifford Scott (psychoanalyst) (1903–1997), Canadian psychoanalyst
