= Kenneth Arthur Davies =

British geologist

Kenneth Arthur Davies CMG OBE
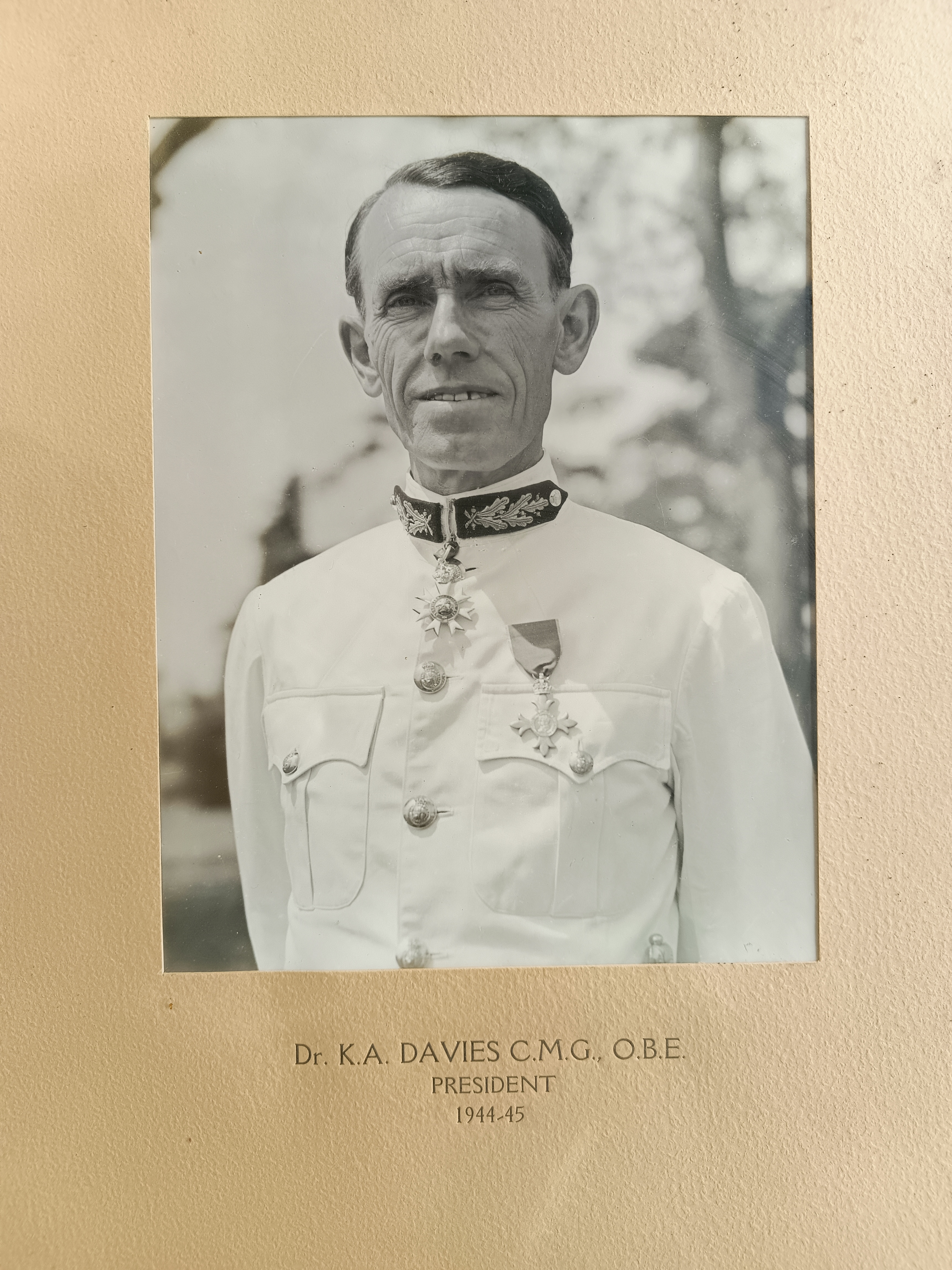
- Born: 1897
- Known for: The geology of East Africa
- Awards: CMG (1952); OBE (1946); Murchison Medal (1954)
- Scientific career
- Fields: Geology

Kenneth Arthur Davies CMG OBE was a British geologist, director of the geological survey of Uganda, and recipient of the Murchison Medal of the Geological Society of London. He served as the 13th president of the Uganda Society from 1944–1945.

== Background and education ==
Davies was born in 1897, and studied geology at the University College of Wales, Aberystwyth under William Pugh after the end of the first world war. Davies subsequently went to work for the colonial geological survey in East Africa, where he eventually became director of the geological survey of Uganda. Among other things, Davies worked on economic deposits, including large deposits of phosphates which were an important source of materials for fertiliser, and on the volcanic rocks of Uganda and the rift valley.

== Awards ==
Davies was appointed OBE in the New Years Honours list for 1946, and CMG in the New Years Honours list for 1952, for his service with the Uganda geological survey, and as deputy director of the (British) Overseas Geological Survey.

In 1954, Davies was awarded the Murchison Medal of the Geological Society of London for his contributions to the geology of East Africa, and particularly for his studies of the older sedimentary rocks and erosion surfaces, and the volcanic and sedimentary rocks of Mount Elgon, Uganda.
