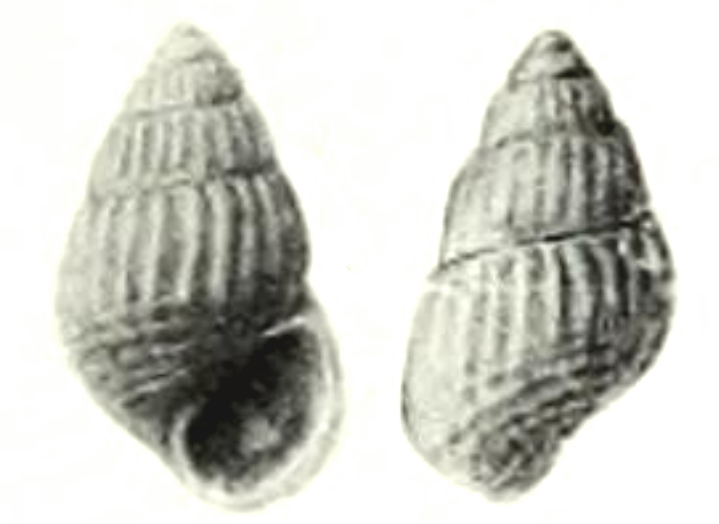
- Shell of Alvania partimcancellata (holotype)

Scientific classification
- Kingdom: Animalia
- Phylum: Mollusca
- Class: Gastropoda
- Subclass: Caenogastropoda
- Order: Littorinimorpha
- Superfamily: Rissooidea
- Family: Rissoidae
- Genus: Alvania
- Species: †A. partimcancellata

Binomial name
- †Alvania partimcancellata Harmer, 1920

Synonyms
- Alvania (Arsenia) partimcancellata Wood in Kend, et Bell, 1886; Rissoa partim-cancellata S. V. Wood in Kendall and R. G. Bell, 1886

= Alvania partimcancellata =

Species of gastropod

Alvania partimcancellata is an extinct species of minute sea snail, a marine gastropod mollusc or micromollusk in the family Rissoidae.

== Description ==
The length of the shell is 3 mm (0.12 in), and its diameter is 1.5 mm (0.059 in).

(Original description) The minute shell is ovate. It contains 5 slightly convex whorls. They are regularly diminishing in size upwards, the body whorl much the largest. The spire measures about one-third the total length. They are ornamented by numerous longitudinal ribs, disappearing towards the periphery against a series of spiral ridges which continue to the base of the shell, with a single line near the suture. The suture is slightly channelled. The aperture is oval.

== Distribution ==
Fossils of this species were found in late Pliocene strata at St. Erth, Cornwall, Great Britain.
