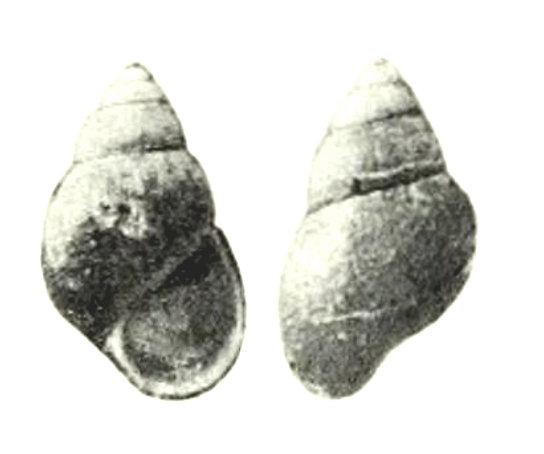
- Shell of Alvania textiliformis (holotype)

Scientific classification
- Kingdom: Animalia
- Phylum: Mollusca
- Class: Gastropoda
- Subclass: Caenogastropoda
- Order: Littorinimorpha
- Superfamily: Rissooidea
- Family: Rissoidae
- Genus: Alvania
- Species: †A. textiliformis

Binomial name
- †Alvania textiliformis Harmer, 1920

= Alvania textiliformis =

Species of gastropod

Alvania textiliformis is an extinct species of minute sea snail, a marine gastropod mollusc or micromollusk in the family Rissoidae.

== Description ==
The length of the shell is 2.5 mm (0.098 in), and its diameter is 1 mm (0.039 in).

(Original description) The minute shell is ovate-conical. It contains 5 or 6, slightly convex whorls. The body whorl is tumid, much the largest, measuring three-fourths the total length. The shell is ornamented by numerous exceedingly fine and delicate closely set longitudinal ribs, hardly reaching the base of the shell, clathrated by equally fine and inconspicuous spiral lines which are continuous and stronger towards the lower end. The suture is clearly marked, but not deep. The short spire is conical and regularly diminishes towards the apex. The aperture is ovate to subcircular, about half the total length, angulate above, rounded below, sometimes a little expanded.

== Distribution ==
Fossils of this species were found in late Pliocene strata at St. Erth, Cornwall, Great Britain.
