= Murchison Medal =

Award from the Geological Society of London

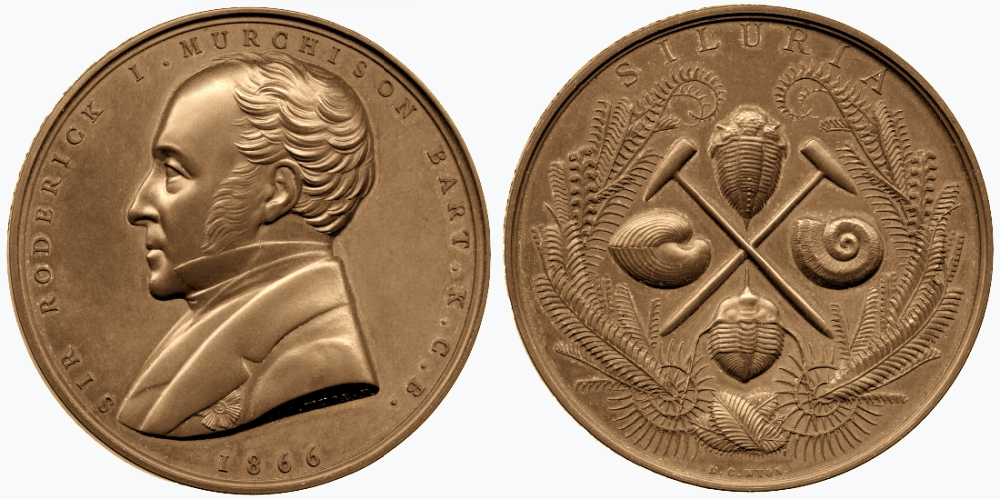
Murchison Medal

The Murchison Medal is an academic award established by Roderick Murchison, who died in 1871. First awarded in 1873, it is normally given to people who have made a significant contribution to geology by means of a substantial body of research and for contributions to 'hard' rock studies. One of the closing public acts of Murchison's life was the founding of a chair of geology and mineralogy in the University of Edinburgh. Under his will there was established the Murchison Medal and geological fund (The Murchison Fund) to be awarded annually by the council of the Geological Society of London.

== Murchison medalists ==
Source: Geological Society

- 1873 William Davies
- 1874 John Jeremiah Bigsby
- 1875 William Jory Henwood
- 1876 Alfred Richard Cecil Selwyn
- 1877 William Branwhite Clarke
- 1878 Hans Bruno Geinitz
- 1879 Frederick McCoy
- 1880 Robert Etheridge
- 1881 Archibald Geikie
- 1882 Jules Gosselet
- 1883 Heinrich Göppert
- 1884 Henry Woodward
- 1885 Ferdinand von Roemer
- 1886 William Whitaker
- 1887 Peter Bellinger Brodie
- 1888 John Strong Newberry
- 1889 James Geikie
- 1890 Edward Hull
- 1891 Waldemar Christofer Brøgger
- 1892 Alexander Henry Green
- 1893 Osmond Fisher
- 1894 William Talbot Aveline
- 1895 Gustaf Lindstrom
- 1896 Thomas Mellard Reade
- 1897 Horace Bolingbroke Woodward
- 1898 Thomas Francis Jamieson
- 1899 Ben Peach
- 1899 John Horne
- 1900 Adolf Erik Nordenskiöld
- 1901 Alfred John Jukes-Browne
- 1902 Frederic William Harmer
- 1903 Charles Callaway
- 1904 George Alexander Louis Lebour
- 1905 Edward John Dunn
- 1906 Charles Thomas Clough
- 1907 Alfred Harker
- 1908 Albert Seward
- 1909 Grenville Arthur James Cole
- 1910 Arthur Philemon Coleman
- 1911 Richard Hill Tiddeman
- 1912 Louis Dollo
- 1913 George Barrow
- 1914 William Augustus Edmond Ussher
- 1915 William Whitehead Watts
- 1916 Robert Kidston
- 1917 George Frederick Matthew
- 1918 Joseph Burr Tyrrell
- 1919 Gertrude Lilian Elles
- 1920 Ethel Shakespear
- 1921 Edgar Sterling Cobbold
- 1922 John William Evans
- 1923 John Joly
- 1924 Walcot Gibson
- 1925 Herbert Henry Thomas
- 1926 William Savage Boulton
- 1927 George Thurland Prior
- 1928 Jakob Johannes Sederholm
- 1929 Charles Alfred Matley
- 1930 Arthur Lewis Hall
- 1931 George Walter Tyrrell
- 1932 William George Fearnsides
- 1933 Alexander Logie du Toit
- 1934 George Hickling
- 1935 Edward Battersby Bailey
- 1936 Ernest Edward Leslie Dixon
- 1937 Leonard James Spencer
- 1938 Henry Howe Bemrose
- 1939 Harold Jeffreys
- 1940 Arthur Holmes
- 1941 Murray Macgregor
- 1942 Henry Hurd Swinnerton
- 1943 Alfred Brammall
- 1944 Vincent Charles Illing
- 1945 Walter Campbell Smith
- 1946 Leonard Hawkes
- 1947 Percy Evans
- 1948 James Phemister
- 1949 Ernest Masson Anderson
- 1950 Tom Eastwood
- 1951 William Bernard Robinson King
- 1952 William John Pugh
- 1953 Frank Dixey
- 1954 Kenneth Arthur Davies
- 1955 Cyril James Stubblefield
- 1956 Frederick Murray Trotter
- 1957 Henry George Dines
- 1958 Robert George Spencer Hudson
- 1959 Sydney Ewart Hollingworth
- 1960 Archibald Gordon MacGregor
- 1961 Wilfrid Norman Edwards
- 1962 Errol Ivor White
- 1963 Norman Leslie Falcon
- 1964 George Hoole Mitchell
- 1965 Walter Frederick Whittard
- 1966 Kingsley Charles Dunham
- 1967 Thomas Stanley Westoll
- 1968 Gilbert Wilson
- 1969 Percy Edward Kent
- 1970 Robert Millner Shackleton
- 1971 Basil Charles King
- 1972 Stephen Robert Nockolds
- 1973 Alwyn Williams
- 1974 William Alexander Deer
- 1975 John Sutton
- 1976 Robert Andrew Howie
- 1977 Martin Harold Phillips Bott
- 1978 Stephen Moorbath
- 1979 Wallace Spencer Pitcher
- 1980 Joseph Victor Smith
- 1981 George Malcolm Brown
- 1982 Derek Flinn
- 1983 Michael John O'Hara
- 1984 James C. Briden
- 1985 Brian Windley
- 1986 Keith Gordon Cox
- 1987 Charles David Curtis
- 1988 Ian Graham Gass
- 1989 Anthony Seymour Laughton
- 1990 Johnson Robin Cann
- 1991 Michael Robert House
- 1992 Ian Dalziel
- 1993 Anthony Brian Watts
- 1994 Jörn Thiede
- 1995 Ian Stuart Edward Carmichael
- 1996 Robert Arbuckle Berner
- 1997 Bernard John Wood
- 1998 (Robert) Stephen (John) Sparks
- 1999 David Gubbins
- 2000 David Headley Green
- 2001 Juan Watterson
- 2002 David Price
- 2003 Alexander Norman Halliday
- 2004 Philip England
- 2005 Christopher Scholz
- 2006 Brian Kennett
- 2007 Herbert Huppert
- 2008 Mike Searle
- 2009 David Kohlstedt
- 2010 Randall R. Parrish
- 2011 E. Bruce Watson
- 2012 Frank S. Spear
- 2013 Peter Kokelaar
- 2014 Julian Pearce
- 2015 Geoff Wadge
- 2016 Jon Blundy
- 2017 Tim Elliott
- 2018 Janne Blichert-Toft
- 2019 Marian Holness
- 2020 Katharine Cashman
- 2021 Graham Pearson
- 2022 Michael Bickle
- 2023 Mathilde Cannat
- 2024 David Pyle
- 2025 Jenny Collier
- 2026 Peter Cawood

== See also ==
- List of geology awards
- List of awards named after people
