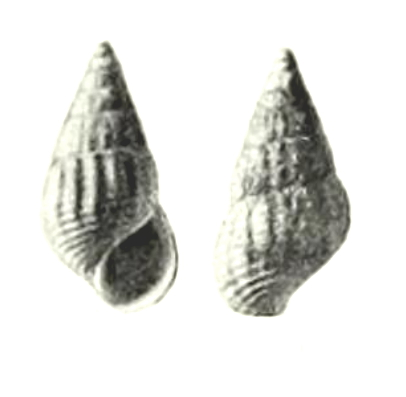
- Shell of Alvania obeliscus (holotype)

Scientific classification
- Kingdom: Animalia
- Phylum: Mollusca
- Class: Gastropoda
- Subclass: Caenogastropoda
- Order: Littorinimorpha
- Superfamily: Rissooidea
- Family: Rissoidae
- Genus: Alvania
- Species: †A. obeliscus

Binomial name
- †Alvania obeliscus Harmer, 1920

= Alvania obeliscus =

Species of gastropod

Alvania obeliscus is an extinct species of minute sea snail, a marine gastropod mollusc or micromollusk in the family Rissoidae.

== Description ==
The length of the shell is 4 mm (0.16 in), and its diameter is 0.3 mm (0.012 in).

(Original description) The small shell is conical. It contains about 7 whorls, nearly flat. The shell is ornamented by strong longitudinal ribs, 15 or 16 on the body whorl, and by well-marked spiral ridges, especially conspicuous near the base. The suture is distinct but not deep. The spire is somewhat elongate, regularly diminishing upwards. The aperture is ovate, compressed and angulated above and rounded below. The outer lip is thin.

== Distribution ==
Fossils of this species were found in late Pliocene strata at St. Erth, Cornwall, Great Britain.
