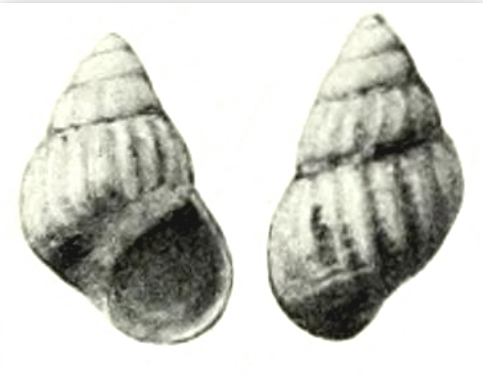
- Shell of Alvania cossmanni (holotype)

Scientific classification
- Kingdom: Animalia
- Phylum: Mollusca
- Class: Gastropoda
- Subclass: Caenogastropoda
- Order: Littorinimorpha
- Superfamily: Rissooidea
- Family: Rissoidae
- Genus: Alvania
- Species: †A. cossmanni

Binomial name
- †Alvania cossmanni Harmer, 1920

= Alvania cossmanni =

Species of gastropod

Alvania cossmanni is an extinct species of minute sea snail, a marine gastropod mollusc or micromollusk in the family Rissoidae.

== Description ==
The length of the shell attains 1 mm, its diameter 1 mm.

(Original description) The minute, ovate shell is solid. The whorls are convex. The body whorl is ventricose and much the largest. The whorls are ornamented by very fine but distinct reticulate sculpture on the upper part of the body whorl. On the base and on the lower part they show rather strong spiral ridges. The spire is short. The aperture is subcircular and expanded. The suture is clearly marked.

== Distribution ==
Fossils of this species were found in late Pliocene strata at St. Erth, Cornwall, Great Britain.
