= Derek Flinn =

British geologist (1922–2012)

- Born: 24 December 1922
- Died: 4 June 2012 (aged 89)
- Education: Imperial College, London BSc (1950), PhD (1952), DSc (1974)
- Known for: Rock strain and shear; geology of Shetland.
- Spouse: Glenys Williams
- Awards: Murchison Medal (1982); Clough Medal (1996)
- Scientific career
- Fields: Structural geology
- Workplaces: University of Liverpool
- Thesis: Regional metamorphism and migmatisation in Delting, Shetland. (1952)
- Doctoral advisor: Herbert Harold Read

Derek Flinn (24 December 1922 – 4 June 2012) was a British geologist, best known for his work on the structure and deformation of rocks and the geology of Shetland.

== Early life and education ==
Flinn was born in Harrow, and went to school at Dr Challoner's Grammar School, Amersham. From 1941 to 1946, he served as a sergeant in the Royal Marines, including in the Special Boat Service in Sri Lanka. During one mission, he became stranded behind Japanese lines with a senior officer who was a geologist, and to pass the time they started looking at the rocks. This experience reportedly drew Flinn to geology. Flinn studied geology at Imperial College, London from 1947 to 1950, and graduated with first class honours. He completed his PhD in 1952, and then spent a year at ETH Zurich.

== Career ==
In 1953, Flinn was appointed lecturer at the University of Liverpool. He spent the rest of his career there and was promoted to reader in 1965 and awarded a personal chair in 1975. He was head of department from 1978 to 1983. Flinn's specialist area was structural geology, and much of his work began and continued in Shetland. His undergraduate dissertation at Imperial College had involved geological mapping in Unst, with H H Read as his advisor. He continued to work on Shetland for his PhD. The quality of his geological mapping led to the award of contracts from the British Geological Survey to map large areas of the Shetland Islands, and a number of published maps and memoirs.

Flinn worked on the quantitative analysis of deformed rocks continued throughout his career. The deformed ‘Funzie Conglomerate' on Shetland is one a classic example; along with a geological ‘in-joke' about ‘pure nonsense and simple nonsense' in another.

In 1957, he held a fellowship at the University of Chicago, and in 1960 spent a year at the Institute of Geology and Mineral Deposits in Moscow, Russia, funded by the Royal Society. In 1962 he toured Norway and Sweden at the expense of the King of Sweden.

In 1986, Flinn retired and was appointed emeritus Professor and Honorary Senior Research Fellow at Liverpool University. He published a book on Shetland local history in 1989 "Travellers in a bygone Shetland".

== Awards ==
Flinn was awarded a DSc from the University of London in 1974. In 1982, he was awarded the Murchison Medal of the Geological Society of London, and the Clough Medal of the Edinburgh Geological Society in 1996.

== Family ==
Derek married Glenys Williams in 1956. Glenys died in 1996. They had two daughters, and five grandchildren.
