= Henry George Dines =

British geologist

- Born: October 20, 1891
- Died: 1964, aged 72
- Education: University of London
- Awards: Bolitho Gold Medal (1933); Murchison Medal (1957)
- Scientific career
- Fields: Geology
- Workplaces: Geological Survey of Great Britain

Henry George Dines (20 October 1891 – 1964) was a British geologist, who was best known for his work on the regional geology of Britain, and the metalliferous mining districts of south-west England. Dines was awarded the Murchison Medal of the Geological Society of London in 1957.

== Early life ==
Dines was born in London in October 1891. He went to school at Dartford Grammar School, and then to university at the Royal School of Mines. His university study was disrupted with the start of World War 1, and he signed up for service with the Royal Naval division engineers in Deal, Kent, on 18 September 1914. He was involved the Gallipoli campaign with the Royal Naval division, and was severely injured in both legs. In 1916, he was appointed temporary lieutenant in the Royal Engineers, and served with the Royal Engineers tunnelers in France. After the war, Dines completed his undergraduate studies. He graduated from the Royal School of Mines with first class honours in 1920, and was awarded the De La Beche medal.

== Career ==
In late 1920, Dines was appointed as a geologist with the Geological Survey of Great Britain. He remained with the survey for his whole career. Over the course of his work he published numerous papers, reports on mineral resources, fourteen maps and a notable memoir on the metal resources of south-west England which was published in 1956. A reviewer of this memoir noted that it was a comprehensive volume, and Dines was to be congratulated for his great service in completing such a gigantic task.

In 1944, Dines was promoted to the post of district geologist for south-west England and the southern Midlands. He retired in 1954. He also served on the council of the geological society from 1950 to 1954.

== Recognition ==
In February 1921 Dines was elected as a Fellow of the Geological Society of London. In 1933, he was awarded the Bolitho Gold Medal of the Royal Geological Society of Cornwall for his work on the ore-bodies of Cornish granites, which he published in 1934. He was awarded the Murchison Medal in 1957 in recognition of his work on the economic geology of south-west England.

== Death ==
Dines died in Surrey in 1964, aged 72.
