= Thomas Mellard Reade =

Thomas Mellard Reade FGS (1832 – 1909) was an English geologist, architect and civil engineer.

== Life ==
Reade laid out the Blundellsands Estate in Liverpool in 1868. He also published geological works The Origin of Mountain Ranges (1886), and The Evolution of Earth Structure (1903).

He was awarded the Murchison Medal of the Geological Society of London in 1896.

He died in 1909 and had an obituary in The Times. His papers are held by the University of Liverpool.
