= Sedgwick Club =

Society at the University of Cambridge

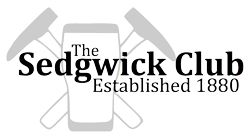
- Named after: Adam Sedgwick
- Formation: 1880
- Type: Geological Society
- Location: Department of Earth Sciences
- Coordinates: 52°20′29.5″N 0°12′20.6″W
- President: Georgie van Dyke
- Vice President: Jago Goodband
- Website: http://sedgwickclub.soc.srcf.net/index.php

The Sedgwick Club is the official student geological society at the University of Cambridge, and is the oldest student-run geological society in the world. It aims to promote the subject of geology among its members through regular talks and social events. It is based in the Department of Earth Sciences.

== History ==
The club was founded in honour of Adam Sedgwick in 1880. Almost every year after its foundation the Sedgwick Club ran yearly field excursions. Sets of notes, photos, sketches, maps and diagrams from these are kept in the Conservation Laboratories of the Sedgwick Museum of Earth Sciences. This annual field trip has been replaced by the "Magical Mystery Tour" in modern times, which involves a weekend excursion at the beginning of Lent term to a location unknown to all on the tour except the club committee members. Careful minutes and accounts have been taken throughout the whole history of the club, which have also survived and are held in The Sedgwick Museum. Women members were accepted in 1896.

== Notable people ==
- David Attenborough
- Gertrude Elles
- Vivian Fuchs
- Alfred Harker
- Dorothy Hill
- Thomas McKenny Hughes
- W. B. R. King
- John Edward Marr
- Clive Oppenheimer
- Kathleen Rishbeth
- Ida Slater
- William Whitehead Watts
- Alice Buxton Winnicott
