= Percy Evans (geologist) =

British geologist (1892–1974)

- Born: December 2, 1892
- Died: December 14, 1974 (aged 82)
- Education: Trinity College, Cambridge
- Known for: Oilfields of India
- Spouse: Enid Evans
- Awards: Murchison Medal (1947)
- Scientific career
- Workplaces: The Burmah Oil Company

Percy Evans (2 December 1892 – 14 December 1974) was a British geologist who worked extensively on the oil fields of India, and later became Chief Geologist of the Burmah Oil Company. He was awarded the Murchison Medal of the Geological Society of London in 1947.

== Education and career ==
Evans studied geology at Trinity College, Cambridge, and joined the Burmah Oil Company in 1915 as a geologist. He spent much of his time working on the geology and structure of the oilfields of Assam, and training geologists in the Burmah Oil company. In 1938, he was appointed Chief Geologist, a position he held until retirement in 1955. He continued as an adviser in retirement.

== Professional service ==
Evans was president of the Geological section of the Indian Science Congress in 1932, and led two field excursions to Assam in 1964, at the age of 72, for the International Geological Congress.

He was a member of the Geologists' Association from 1914, and a trustee from 1955 to 1964. He was president of the Hertfordshire Natural History society from 1956 to 1958. The society now holds an annual 'Percy Evans Lecture' in his honour., as do Oil India.

== Awards ==
Evans’ work was rewarded with a number of accolades. He was awarded the Gold Medal of the Mining, Metallurgical and Geological Institute of India, and elected Honorary Fellow in 1964.

He was awarded a silver medal by the Royal Society of the Arts for his 1946 paper on the oilfields of India and Burma.

In 1947, he was awarded the Murchison Medal of the Geological Society of London in recognition of his work on the oilfields of Burma and Assam, and on the geological interpretation of gravitational surveys. He was elected Honorary Member of the Geologists Association in 1968.

The Percy Evans Road in Duliajan, where the field headquarters of Oil India is located, is named in his honor.

== Family ==
Evans married Kathleen Newman in Kolkata cathedral in 1927, but she died shortly after, of tuberculosis. In 1949, Evans married Enid Mary Smedley, who was a zoologist and geologist. Smedley had a BSc (1931) and MSc (1932) from the University of Manitoba, and had worked at the University of Western Ontario. During retirement, both worked on a project on the geology of Hertfordshire, which was later developed into a book by John Catt.

Evans died on 14 December 1974. His wife Enid died, aged 98, in October 2009.
