= William Savage Boulton =

English geologist, mining engineer, and water engineer

William Savage Boulton FGS (8 August 1867, Oldswinford, Worcestershire, UK – 1954) was an English geologist, mining engineer, and water engineer.

Boulton was educated at King Edward's School, Birmingham, Mason Science College, and the Royal College of Science. He was from 1890 to 1897 an assistant lecturer and demonstrator for Professor Charles Lapworth at Mason Science College. Boulton was then a professor of geology at University College, Cardiff from 1897 to 1913, when he went to the University of Birmingham as Lapworth's successor upon the latter's retirement in 1913. Boulton was Dean of the Faculty of Science at the University of Birmingham from 1926 to 1929. He was the editor of and a contributor to Practical Coal-Mining (6 vols.) and the author of many papers on geology and applications of geology to water supply and mining.

He was the president of the Cardiff Naturalists' Society from 1910 to 1911. He was the president of the Geological Section of the British Association for the Advancement of Science in 1916. He was awarded the Murchison Medal in 1926.

Boulton married in 1898 and was the father of one son.
