= Upchurch Pottery =

Upchurch Pottery was a pottery business established in 1909 in Upchurch, Kent, by the Wakely brothers.

Most of the clay used in production was taken from what is now called Springbank Farm in Poot Lane Upchurch.

In the mid-1930s it was bought by Alice Buxton Winnicott and here she manufactured her Claverdon tableware, named after her birthplace and sold in Heal's, on the Tottenham Court Road, London. The pottery closed in 1963.
