= Steno Medal =

The Steno Medal, created in 1969, is awarded by the Geological Society of Denmark to honor a prominent geologist. It was named after the Dane Niels Steensen (also known as Nicolaus Steno), who is recognized internationally for his effort in the field of geological science. Steno (1638–1686) made groundbreaking contributions to crystallography as well as stratigraphy, which are fundamental disciplines in geology.

The Steno medal is awarded every four to five years. It is constructed by the Royal court medalist Harald Salomon and stored at the Royal Danish Mint. The establishment of the medal was made possible through a gift from the mining company Kryolitselskabet Øresund A/S.

The medal has been awarded 9 times since 1969:

2015: Janne Blichert-Toft, France (high temperature geochemistry, petrology and geochronology)

2009: Finn Surlyk, Denmark (sedimentology, palaeoecology, basin analysis in Greenland and Denmark)

1998: Katharina von Salis Perch Nielsen, Switzerland (micro palaeontology in Denmark and Greenland)

1993: John Callomon (fossils in East Greenlands Jura)

1989: Victor R. McGregor, New Zealand/Denmark/Greenland (basement geologi, Archaic in West Greenland)

1984: Jörn Thiede, Germany (ocean sediments, North Atlantic)

1979: Stephen Moorbath, U.K. (isotope geology, dating of West Greenland Precambrium)

1974: John Haller, Switzerland (Tectonics, East Greenlands caledonides)

1969: Sigurdur Thorarinsson, Iceland (volcanology, tephra chronology)

== See also ==
- List of geology awards
