= Stephen Moorbath =

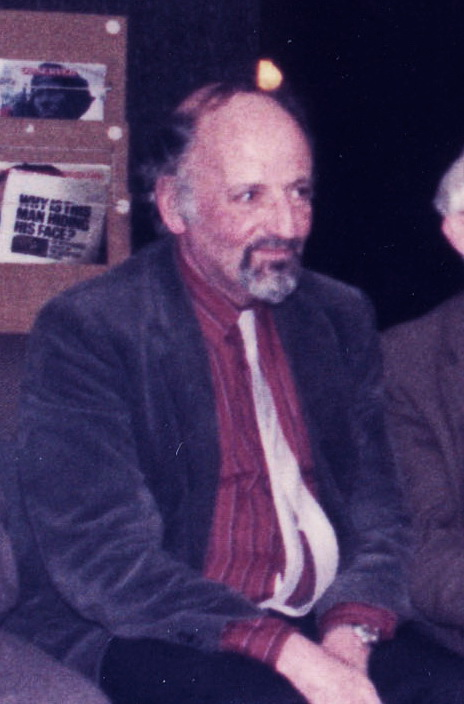
- Stephen Moorbath in Linacre College Common Room, 1986
- Born: 9 May 1929; Magdeburg, Germany
- Died: 16 October 2016 (aged 87)
- Education: Lincoln College, Oxford
- Awards: FRS (1977); Murchison Medal (1978); Steno Medal (1979)
- Scientific career
- Fields: geochronology
- Workplaces: University of Oxford

Stephen Erwin Moorbath FRS (9 May 1929–16 October 2016) was a German-born British geochronologist. He set up (1956–58) and then directed the Geological Age and Isotope Research Group at the University of Oxford, before retiring.

== Research ==
Moorbath and his collaborators demonstrated the great gap between Scourian (2,600 million years old) and Laxfordian (1,600 million years old) gneisses in northwest Scotland. He established the basic mineral age pattern of the Scottish and Irish Caledonides (420–450 million years old) and interpreted it as a cooling-uplift interval. He also pioneered lead isotope studies of ancient gneisses, showing that much of the Lewisian existed over 2,900 million years ago. Stephen dated the oldest rocks yet known on the Earth (more than 3,800 million years old) from west Greenland, and applied the rubidium–strontium method to date Torridonian sediments. In addition, he elucidated the complex history of British and Scandinavian lead ores, and showed that the Tertiary acid magmas of Skye are re-melted Lewisian gneisses (more than 3,000 million years old) whereas those of Iceland are of mantle origin.

== Awards and honours ==
Moorbath was elected a Fellow of the Royal Society (FRS) in 1977. In 1978 he was awarded the Murchison Medal by the Geological Society of London and in 1979 he was awarded the Steno Medal by the Danish Geological Society for his work on isotopes and dating the Precambrian of Western Greenland.
