= Jörn Thiede =

German palaeontologist and marine geologist

- Born: April 14, 1941; Berlin, Germany
- Died: July 14, 2021 (aged 80); Kiel, Germany
- Education: University of Kiel
- Awards: Steno Medal (1984); Leibniz Prize (1988); Murchison Medal (1994); Hans Stille Medal (2003); Willy Brandt Prize (2011)
- Scientific career
- Fields: Ocean drilling, Polar science and Paleoclimate
- Workplaces: University of Bergen; Oregon State University; University of Oslo; GEOMAR; Alfred Wegener Institute
- Thesis: (1971)

Jörn Thiede (14 April 1941 – 15 July 2021) was a German palaeontologist and polar scientist, known for his studies on the climate history of the Mediterranean and North Atlantic oceans. He was awarded numerous medals and awards for his work.

== Early life ==
Jörn Thiede was born in Berlin, Germany on 14 April 1941. He attended primary school in Schleswig-Holstein, and from 1951 to 1960 went to high school (gymnasium) in Kiel. After completing his military service, in 1962 Thiede went to the University of Kiel to study geology. He also spent time in Buenos Aires, Argentina, and Vienna, Austria. In 1967, he completed his diploma thesis on rocks of Devonian age from the Rhenish Slate Mountains, supervised by professor Krömmelbein. Thiede then stayed in Kiel to complete a doctorate on ocean-floor sediments of the eastern Atlantic under the supervision of German marine geologist, Eugen Seibold.

== Career ==
After graduating, Thiede moved to Aarhus University, where he began work as a lecturer in geology. In 1972, Thiede participated as a sedimentologist on Leg 24 of the Deep Sea Drilling Project, with an expedition of the drilling ship Glomar Challenger to the Indian Ocean. From 1973 to 1975, Thiede moved to Bergen, Norway as a lecturer. In 1977, he joined leg 39 of the Deep Sea Drilling Project to the central Atlantic. In 1974, he moved to Oregon State University where he began a collaboration with German oceanographer Erwin Suess. In 1977, he was appointed to the chair of historical geology at the University of Oslo. Further deep-sea drilling expeditions followed with legs 61 and 62 to the Pacific.

In 1982, he returned to Kiel, initially as professor in historical geology and palaeontology. His focus was on the history of the northern latitudes and the Arctic Ocean. This culminated in two further ocean drilling campaigns with the JOIDES Resolution: leg 104 to the Norwegian Continental Margin, and leg 151, the North Atlantic Gateways.

Thiede was appointed the founding director of the GEOMAR Research Centre for Marine Geosciences at Kiel (1987–95), and head of the GEOMAR Department of Palaeo-Oceanology (1987–97). In 1997 he was appointed director of the Alfred Wegener Institute for Polar and Marine Research (AWI) in Bremerhaven, Germany, and also professor of palaeoceanography at the University of Bremen. He became involved with large-scale projects, including the conversion of the research icebreaker Polarstern and the building of Neumayer III, the German research station on Antarctica. He extended cooperation in Arctic polar research with Norway, France and Russia, both through research stations on Spitsbergen, and with research Institutes in Moscow and St. Petersburg.

== Professional work ==
Thiede served as president of the European Polar Board from 1999 to 2002 and president of the Scientific Committee on Antarctic Research from 2002 to 2006. He was also vice-president of the Helmholtz Association from 2003 to 2006. He was inducted into the Norwegian Academy of Science and Letters in 1988.

== Selected works ==
Thiede published many papers and reports over his career. Selected examples:

- Thiede, J (1975). "Distribution of foraminifera in surface waters of a coastal upwelling area". Nature. 253 (5494): 712–714. doi:10.1038/253712a0.
- Thiede, J; Van Andel, TH (1977). "The paleoenvironment of anaerobic sediments in the Late Mesozoic South Atlantic Ocean". Earth and Planetary Science Letters. 33 (3): 301–309. doi:10.1016/0012-821X(77)90082-6.
- Thiede, J (1978). "A Glacial Mediterranean". Nature. 276 (5689): 680–683. doi:10.1038/276680a0.
- Thiede, J; et al. (1998). "Late Cenozoic history of the Polar North Atlantic: results from ocean drilling". Quaternary Science Reviews. 17 (1–3): 185–208. doi:10.1016/S0277-3791(97)00076-0.
- Thiede, J; Johannessen, OM (2008). "Climate change in the North – past, present and future". Episodes. 31: 163–167. doi:10.18814/epiiugs/2008/v31i1/022. hdl:1956/2760.

== Awards and recognition ==
Thiede received many awards in recognition of his scientific achievements, and his contributions to international polar and marine science. These include:

- 1984 Steno Medal of the Danish Geological Society
- 1988 Leibniz Prize of the German Research Foundation (DFG)
- 1994 Murchison Medal of the Geological Society of London
- 1995 The Cross of Merit on Ribbon of the Order of Merit of the Federal Republic of Germany
- 2003 Hans Stille Medal of the German Research Foundation (DFG)
- 2010 honorary citizenship of the city of Bremerhaven
- 2011 Willy Brandt Prize

He was also awarded the Grand Prix d`Océanographie of the Fondation Rainier III de Monaco and appointed Chevalier de l'Chevalier de l'Ordre national du Mérite, France. Among a number of honorary fellowships, he was awarded the status of Honorary Fellow of the European Union of Geosciences, and Honorary Member of the Scientific Committee on Antarctic Research by acclamation in 2006. He received Honorary Doctorates from the University of Gothenburg, Sweden and from St. Petersburg State University.

== Family ==
In 1970, Thiede married Sigrid, daughter of German oceanographer Günter Dietrich. Thiede died on 15 July 2021 in Kiel.
