= Oliver Bulman =

British palaeontologist

- Bulman in 1940
- Born: Oliver Meredith Boone Bulman; 20 May 1902; Wandsworth, London, England
- Died: 18 February 1974 (aged 71); Cambridge, England
- Education: Imperial College
- Awards: Lyell Medal (1953); Fellow of the Royal Society
- Scientific career
- Workplaces: University of Cambridge
- Doctoral advisor: Gertrude Elles
- Doctoral students: Martin J. S. Rudwick

Oliver Meredith Boone Bulman (20 May 1902 – 18 February 1974) was a British palaeontologist. He was Woodwardian Professor of Geology at the University of Cambridge.

== Early life and education ==
Oliver Bulman was born in London to artist Henry Herbert Bulman and his wife Beatrice Elizabeth Boone. He was the second of three children.

Bulman went to Battersea Grammar School in 1910, but wishing to study geology, which the school did not teach, he became an evening, and later day, student at Chelsea Polytechnic. He gained a London University scholarship in 1920 and went to Imperial College to study geology and zoology. He graduated with a first class BSc in geology in 1923. Bulman went on to a PhD degree jointly with James Stubblefield on the lower Palaeozoic of the Wrekin district, of Shropshire in 1926.

== Career ==
Awarded a senior studentship, he worked for a year on Permian amphibians with Walter Frederick Whittard and for two years at Sidney Sussex College, Cambridge, where he studied dendroid graptolites under Gertrude Lilian Elles. Work on the Palaeontographical Society's monograph British Dendroid Graptolites (1927 and 1928) earned him a Cambridge PhD degree in 1928. He then worked as demonstrator at Imperial College and at Cambridge. He became reader in palaeozoology in 1944 and Woodwardian Professor of Geology in 1955.

== Honours ==
Bulman was elected an FRS in 1940 and was president of the geology section of the British Association, the Palaeontological Association (1960–62), the Geological Society (1962–64), and the Palaeontographical Society (1971–74). The Geological Society awarded him the Lyell Medal in 1953.

== Family ==
In 1938 he married Marguerite Fearnsides, daughter of William Fearnsides, the professor of geology at Sheffield. They had a son and three daughters. He died at home in Cambridge in February 1974.

== Resources ==
Archives

19 boxes of records are at Sedgwick Museum of Earth Sciences. The collection contains correspondence with contemporaries including Harry B. Whittington and Barry Rickards mostly concerning Graptolite research. There is also correspondence relating to the Paleontological Society and Palaeontological Association as well as international conferences and some committee meeting notes and papers. Other records include typescripts of papers, notebooks of trips made to Sweden, Brussels, Norway and Holland, personal papers, maps, and lantern slides used for teaching.

Academic offices
Preceded by W. B. R. King	Woodwardian Professor of Geology, University of Cambridge; 1955-1966	Succeeded by Harry B. Whittington
