= Ian Graham Gass =

British geologist (1926–1992)

- Born: 20 March 1926; Gateshead
- Died: 8 October 1992 (aged 66); Bedford
- Citizenship: British
- Education: University of Leeds
- Awards: Murchison Medal (1988); Fellow of the Royal Society
- Scientific career
- Workplaces: Sudan Geological Survey (1952-55); Cyprus Geological Survey (1955-60); Leicester University (1960-61); University of Leeds (1961-69); Open University (1969-92)
- Doctoral advisor: W.Q. Kennedy

Ian Graham Gass, FRS, geologist, was Professor of Earth Sciences and Head of Discipline at the Open University, Milton Keynes and he was President of the IAVCEI (1983–87). He was married to Mary Pearce (1955, one son, one daughter).

At the close of the 1960s, a paradigm shift in scientific understanding occurred that changed the static field of geology into a more dynamic Earth Science. By showing that the Troödos Mountains, Cyprus is a remnant of seafloor spreading, Ian Gass played a role in that transformation.

He was educated at the University of Leeds under Prof W.Q. Kennedy FRS FRSE.

== Selected publications ==
- I. G. Gass; Peter J. Smith; R. C. L. Wilson, eds. (1971). Understanding the earth : a reader in the earth sciences. Open University set book. Sussex: Artemis Press. p. 355. ISBN 0-85141-262-9.
- Clifford, Tom N.; Gass, Ian G., eds. (1970). African Magmatism and Tectonics. Edinburgh: Oliver and Boyd. p. 461. ISBN 978-0-05-001709-8.
- Baker, P. E.; Gass, I. G.; Harris, P. G.; Le Maitre, R. W. (1964). "The volcanological report of the Royal Society Expedition to Tristan da Cunha, 1962". Philosophical Transactions of the Royal Society of London. Series A, Mathematical and Physical Sciences. 256 (1075): 439–575. Bibcode:1964RSPTA.256..439B. doi:10.1098/rsta.1964.0011. S2CID 123112405.
