= Brammallite =

Phyllosilicate mineral in the dioctahedral mica group

General
- Category: Phyllosilicate minerals
- Group: Mica group, dioctahedral mica group
- Formula: (Na,H_{3}O)(Al,Mg,Fe)_{2}(Si,Al)_{4}O_{10}[(OH)_{2}·(H_{2}O)]
- IMA symbol: Bmr
- Crystal system: Monoclinic
- Crystal class: Prismatic (2/m) (same H-M symbol)

Identification
- Color: White
- Crystal habit: Earthy clay like
- Cleavage: Perfect on {001}
- Mohs scale hardness: 2 1/2 – 3
- Luster: Dull, earthy
- Streak: White
- Diaphaneity: Translucent
- Specific gravity: 2.83 – 2.88
- Optical properties: Biaxial (−) 2V: Measured: 5° to 25°
- Refractive index: nα = 1.535 – 1.570 nβ = 1.555 – 1.600 nγ = 1.565 – 1.605
- Birefringence: δ = 0.030 – 0.035

Brammallite is a sodium-rich analogue of illite. First described in 1943 for an occurrence in Llandybie, Wales, it was named for British geologist and mineralogist Alfred Brammall (1879–1954).

Brammallite is believed to be a degradation product of paragonite through the process of sodium leaching, though it can also occur when muscovite or other aluminous materials are altered. Just as illite (whose mineral series it is in), it is a non-expanding, non-plastic, clay-sized, micaceous mineral. Brammallite is a phyllosilicate or layered silicate. Structurally, brammallite is quite similar to muscovite or sericite with slightly more silicon, magnesium, iron, and water and slightly less tetrahedral aluminium and interlayer potassium.

It occurs as aggregates of small monoclinic white crystals. Due to the small size, positive identification usually requires x-ray diffraction analysis.

Similar to illite, and of rare use, it can be used as a flux in high fire ceramic bodies due to its high insoluble sodium content, but unlike common sodium-containing fluxes (i.e. feldspar) deposits of it have the advantage of its extremely small clay-like particles that remove the need for grinding, but unlike other clear minerals it does not expand or develop plasticity/shrinkage with water. Brammallite shares all of these ceramic properties with illite, but these two minerals differ in their sodium and potassium contents.
