= Wilfrid Norman Edwards =

British geologist

- Known for: Geological mapping
- Awards: Murchison Medal 1961
- Scientific career
- Institutions: British Geological Survey

Wilfrid Norman Edwards (born 1897) was a British geologist, who worked for the British Geological Survey for his whole career. He published numerous geological maps and reports on the geology of various parts of England. He was president of the Yorkshire Geological Society in 1957, and was awarded the Murchison Medal of the Geological Society of London in 1961 for his contributions to the stratigraphy and structure of the Coal Measures, particularly in the Yorkshire and Nottinghamshire Coalfield.

== Career ==
Edwards was appointed to the geological survey of Great Britain in 1923, and worked for the survey for his whole career, publishing maps and reports on the geological structure of various parts of England. By the late 1920s, he was based in Yorkshire, and was elected a member of the Yorkshire Geological Society. Edwards was elected a Fellow of the Geological Society of London in January 1937. In 1955, he was the district geologist to the Yorkshire Unit of the geological survey, when he gave an address on coal fields to the society. Edwards held the post of president of the Yorkshire geological society in 1957. In 1961, when he was awarded the Murchison Medal, he held the post of assistant director with the geological survey of Great Britain, and was based in their Leeds office.

== Family ==
Edwards married Monica Tomlinson in Nottingham in 1927.

== Selected works ==
Edwards published papers, reports and maps under the name 'Wilfrid Edwards' and under his full name 'Wilfrid Norman Edwards', or 'W N Edwards'.

Maps

1923. Geological Survey of England and Wales 6 inch [1:10 560] county series, Wiltshire. Southampton: Ordnance Survey.

- Sheet 21 NW

1924. Geological Survey of England and Wales 6 inch [1:10 560] county series, Wiltshire. Southampton: Ordnance Survey.

- Sheet 21 NE, Sheet 21 SE
- Sheet 23 SW
- Sheet 28 NE, Sheet 28 SE, Sheet 28 SW
- Sheet 29 NW, Sheet 29 SW

1954. Geological Survey of England and Wales 6 inch [1:10 560] county series, Derbyshire. Southampton: Ordnance Survey.

- Sheet 12 SE drift, Sheet 12 SE solid & drift, Sheet 12 SE solid
- Sheet 13 SW drift, Sheet 13 SW solid & drift, Sheet 13 SW solid

Books and reports.

- Whitaker, W. and Edwards, W. (1926) Wells and springs of Dorset. Memoirs of the Geological Survey, England, 119 pp. HM Stationery Office.
- Edwards, W. (1951) The Concealed Coalfield of Yorkshire and Nottinghamshire, 3rd ed. Memoirs of the Geological Society: England and Wales. HMSO, London. 285 pp.
