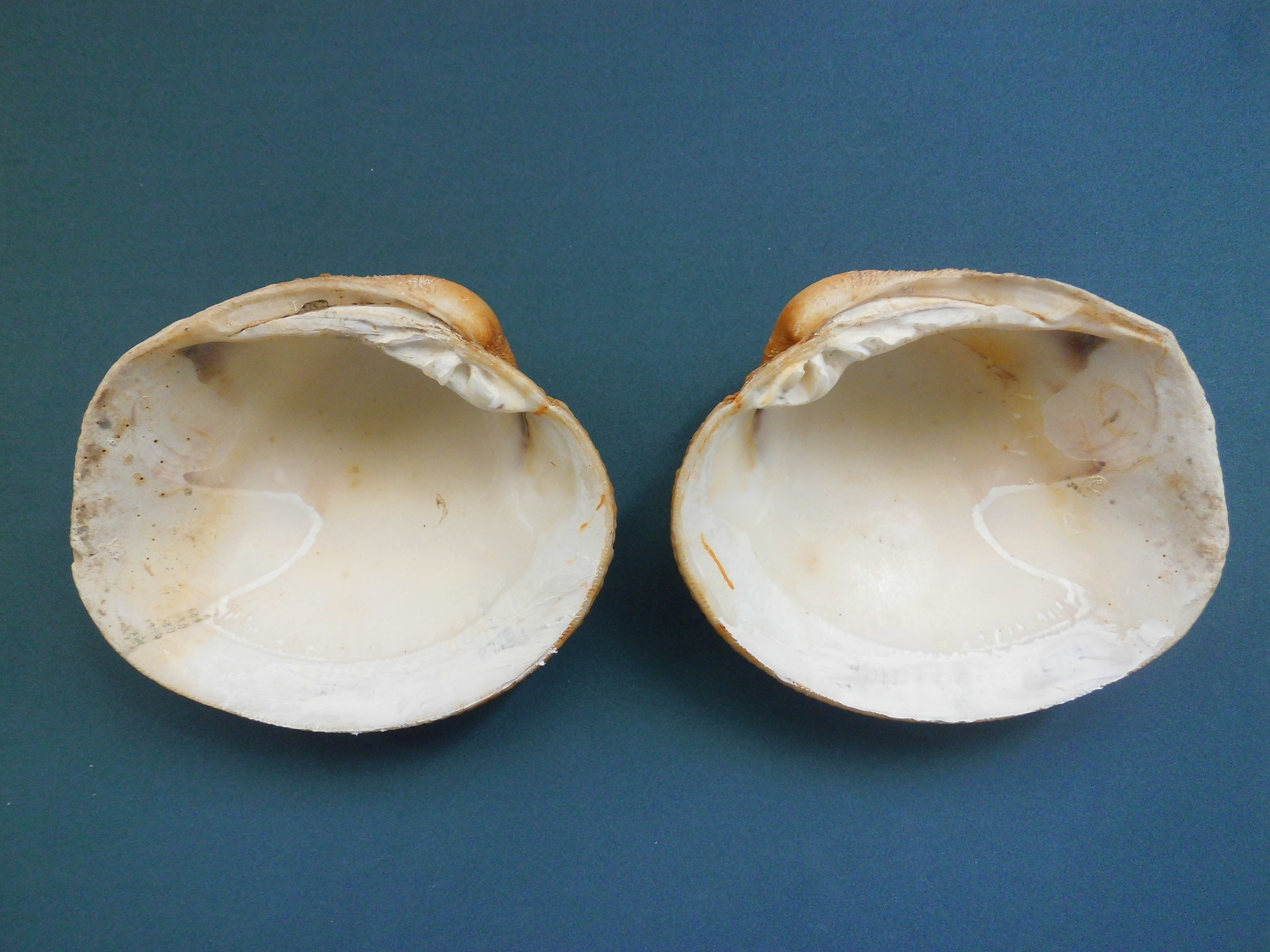

Scientific classification
- Kingdom: Animalia
- Phylum: Mollusca
- Class: Bivalvia
- Order: Venerida
- Superfamily: Veneroidea
- Family: Veneridae
- Genus: Periglypta
- Species: P. listeri

Binomial name
- Periglypta listeri (Gray, 1838)

= Periglypta listeri =

Species of bivalve

Periglypta listeri, or the princess Venus clam, is a species of bivalve mollusc in the family Veneridae. It can be found along the Atlantic coast of North America, ranging from southern Florida to the West Indies.
