= Marian Holness =

British geologist

Marian Holness FRS
- Born: Marian Barbara Holness
- Education: University of Cambridge (PhD)
- Awards: Royal Society University Research Fellowship (1994); Murchison Medal (2019)
- Scientific career
- Fields: Earth Sciences; Geology; Mineralogy; Petrology
- Workplaces: University of Cambridge; University of Edinburgh
- Thesis: Experimental and petrological studies of textural equilibrium and fluid flow in metacarbonate rocks : the Beinn an Dubhaich Aureole, Skye (1990)
- Website: www.esc.cam.ac.uk/directory/marian-holness

Marian Barbara Holness is a British geologist who is a professor in the Department of Earth Sciences at the University of Cambridge.

== Education ==
Holness was educated at state schools in Southampton and the University of Cambridge where she studied the Natural Sciences Tripos and completed a PhD in 1990.

== Career and research ==
Her research interests are in Earth Sciences, Geology, Mineralogy and Petrology.

She was awarded the Murchison Medal of the Geological Society of London in 2019, and elected a Fellow of the Royal Society in 2020.
