= Graham Pearson =

British geologist

Professor D. Graham Pearson FRS
- Education: Imperial College, London (BSc); University of Leeds (PhD)
- Awards: Murchison Medal (2021)
- Scientific career
- Fields: Isotope geochemistry and geology
- Workplaces: Durham University; University of Alberta

D. Graham Pearson FRS is a British geologist and geochemist, who is best known for his work using isotopic tracers and characteristics of diamonds to understand the composition and evolution of the mantle roots underpinning continents and the interior of the Earth. Since 2010, he has been a professor and Canada Excellence in Research Chair at the University of Alberta, Canada. He was elected to Fellowship of the Royal Society in 2023.

== Life and works ==
Pearson was born in West Yorkshire. He completed his undergraduate degree in geology at Imperial College, London, and then undertook a PhD in isotope geochemistry at the University of Leeds. After holding research positions at the Carnegie Institution of Washington and the Open University, Pearson was appointed to a lectureship at the University of Durham. In 2010, he was appointed to the Canada Excellence in Research Chair at the University of Alberta where he established the Arctic Resources Geochemistry Laboratory.

== Awards ==
Pearson was awarded the 2017 Robert Wilhelm Bunsen medal of the European Geosciences Union for research of the sub-continental mantle and innovations in geochemical techniques. In 2021, he received the Murchison Medal from the Geological Society of London for studies of the deep Earth and planetary materials. He was elected a Fellow of the Royal Society in 2023.

In 2025, a natural analogue of synthetic β-Ca2P2O7 was found in a super-deep diamond from the Chapadão plateau, Mato Grosso, Brazil. It was named grahampearsonite to recognize Pearson's contributions to diamond research.
