= John William Evans (geologist) =

British geologist

John William Evans CBE (27 July 1857 – 16 November 1930) was a British geologist.

He was born the son of Evan Evans in London and educated at University College School and University College. He was called to the bar in 1878 and worked for a while as a barrister.

Around 1892 he studied at the Royal College of Science and was awarded D.Sc. after which he spent several years in India as a geologist, retiring in 1905. From 1911 he took up a new career as a lecturer and researcher at Imperial College of Science and Technology.

Evans was elected a Fellow of the Royal Society in 1919. At that time he was Lecturer in Petrology at Imperial College and Professional Adviser to the Colonial Office on minerals other than petroleum and coal. He was president of the Geologists' Association for 1912–14 and president of Geological Society of London for 1924–26.

He received the Murchison Medal of the Geological Society in 1922. He was awarded the CBE in the 1923 New Year Honours for his work as the Representative of the Colonies and Protectorates administered by the Secretary of State for the Colonies on the Governing Body of the Imperial Mineral Resources Bureau.

In 1882 he married Emily Read in Hampstead, London. She died the following year and in 1901 he was remarried to Jessie Granger with whom he had two daughters.
