= Alfred Brammall =

British geologist (1879–1954)

Alfred Brammall Alfred Brammall
- Born: 2 September 1879
- Died: 2 May 1954 (aged 74)
- Education: Bangor Normal College
- Known for: Geology; mineralogy and petrology
- Awards: Order of St Sava (1930); Murchison Medal (1943)
- Scientific career
- Workplaces: Imperial College, London

Alfred Brammall (2 September 1879 – 2 May 1954) was a British geologist, mineralogist and petrologist who won numerous awards for his work.

== Education and career ==
Brammall trained as a teacher at Bangor Normal College, and then taught at Bury Municipal Technical School and Manchester School of Technology from 1898 to 1914. He was senior assistant master (1904 to 1907), tutor for school teacher training) from 1903 to 1907, and lecturer and later head of department from 1904 to 1915. He was also assistant director of education, Bury, 1907–1915. After his war service from 1915 to 1919, which included a secondment to the United States of America as an adviser in gas warfare defense, Brammall returned to the UK. He took up a position as demonstrator in geology at Imperial College, London. He remained there as lecturer (1921–1928), lecturer in petrology (1928–1933) and later reader and assistant professor (in petrology, with geochemistry). From 1922 to 1929, he was also head of the department of geology at the Northern Polytechnic Institute.

== Research ==
Brammall worked widely across the fields of mineralogy, petrology and geochemistry. Among others, he wrote papers on the granites of Dartmoor, and on mineral chemistry and crystallography.

Brammall acted as consultant geologist and petrologist to various colonial geological surveys, and companies with interests in mining and quarrying including Selection Trust and Roman Deep Holdings. He also served on a research panel of the Institution of Mining and Metallurgy looking at dusts and silicosis. From 1945, he served a term as regional vice president (Europe) for the Society of Economic Geologists.

== Charity work and volunteering ==
Brammall was one of the founders of the Imperial College freemasons lodge in 1923. During World War II, Brammall was a civilian volunteer with the Civil Defence Service from 1940 to 1945. From 1942 his roles included gas identification officer, Air Raid Patrol Warden (ARP), fire guard leader and sector captain.

== Awards and recognition ==
Brammall received the Wollaston fund (1925) and the Murchison Medal (1943) from the Geological Society of London. He was awarded the William Bolitho Gold Medal by the Royal Geological Society of Cornwall in 1927, and the Order of St Sava in 1930 in recognition of his work on the lead-zinc mines in Yugoslavia.

In 1943, mineralogist and crystallographer Frederick A. Bannister found that a white coating on fracture surfaces which Brammall had found in Llandebie was a new sodium-rich mineral, similar to mica. He named this brammallite.

Brammall's obituary noted that ‘few scientists combined to such a high degree the aptitude for research and the ability to teach’.
