= Alfred John Jukes-Browne =

British palaeontologist (1851–1914)

Alfred John Jukes-Browne FRS FGS (16 April 1851 – 14 August 1914) was a British invertebrate palaeontologist and stratigrapher.

He was born Alfred John Browne near Wolverhampton in 1851 to Alfred Hall and Caroline Amelia (née Jukes) Browne. His uncle was the geologist Joseph Beete Jukes, well known for his work on the English and Irish geological surveys. Browne added his mother's maiden name of Jukes to his own as soon as he came of age. He was educated at Highgate School (1863–1868) and gained a BA at St John's College, Cambridge.

He secured a post in 1874 on the staff of the Geological Survey and was chiefly occupied in mapping parts of Suffolk, Cambridge, Rutland, and Lincoln up to 1883 and then entrusted with the preparation of a monograph on the British Upper Cretaceous rocks. He subsequently wrote a number of books on the subject. He retired from the Geological Survey in 1902 on account of ill-health.

He was awarded the Murchison Medal of the Geological Society of London in 1901, and elected a Fellow of the Royal Society in 1909.

He died in Devon in 1914. He had married Emma Jessie Smith in 1881, who died giving birth to their second child in 1892.

== Publications ==
- The Student's Handbook of Historical Geology (1886) The student's handbook of historical geology
- The student's Handbook of Stratigraphical Geology (1902) The student's handbook of stratigraphical geology
- The geology of Cyprus (1905) with Bellamy, Charles Vincent The geology of Cyprus
- The Building of the British Isles (1911) The building of the British Isles, ..
- The Cretaceous Rocks of Great Britain (1904)
