= Cyril James Stubblefield =

British geologist

Sir (Cyril) James Stubblefield FRS (1901–1999) was a British geologist. Stubblefield was president of the Geological Society of London from 1958 to 1960 and was director of the Geological Survey of Great Britain from 1960 until 1966.

== Early life ==
Stubblefield was born in Cambridge, the only son of a gardener and his wife. He gained a scholarship to The Perse School, Cambridge.

== Education ==
After work as a junior factory chemist, Stubblefield moved to London to continue his education in evening classes at the South-Western Polytechnic (later Chelsea College). He gained a scholarship to Imperial College, London, where he gained an ARCS and BSc in geology in 1923, with first class honours. Stubblefield was a member of the Links Club of the City and Guilds College whilst at Imperial College.

== Career ==
In 1923, Stubblefield was appointed demonstrator in geology at Imperial and began research into the early Palaeozoic rocks of Shropshire, in parallel with Oliver Bulman. His work was supported by the Daniel Pidgeon fund of the Geological Society, and he gained his PhD in 1925. In 1929 he published the Handbook of the Geology of Great Britain with J. W. Evans.

In 1928 Stubblefield joined the palaeontology department of the Geological Survey, at the Museum of Practical Geology. Here he worked on the Lower Palaeozoic fossils of Shrewsbury, the Carboniferous of the coalfields of south Wales, Kent, and Cumbria.

Stubblefield became chief palaeontologist of the survey in 1947, assistant director in 1953 and director in 1960. As director, Stubblefield oversaw the reorganisation of the British and Overseas surveys, and the Museum of Practical Geology into the Institute of Geological Sciences. He retired in 1966.

== Honours ==
Stubblefield was secretary of the Palaeontographical Society from 1934 to 1948, and subsequently president and compiler of the trilobite section of Zoological Record. He was president of the Geological Society (1958–60), receiving the Murchison Fund, the Bigsby medal (1945), and the Murchison Medal (1951). He received his London DSc in 1942, and was elected Fellow of the Royal Society (FRS) in 1944. Stubblefield was knighted in the 1965 New Year Honours. He was president of the Sixth International Congress of Carboniferous Geology and Stratigraphy in 1967, and president of the Palaeontographical Society from 1966 to 1970. A trilobite genus, Stubblefieldia, was named in his honour, as were many other species.

== Private life ==
Stubblefield married Muriel Yakchee in 1932. They had two sons Rodney and Peter. He died in 1999 and was cremated in Ruislip.
