= Edward John Dunn =

English-born Australian geologist (1844-1937)

Edward John Dunn (1 November 1844 – 20 April 1937) was an English-born Australian geologist, winner of the 1905 Murchison Medal.

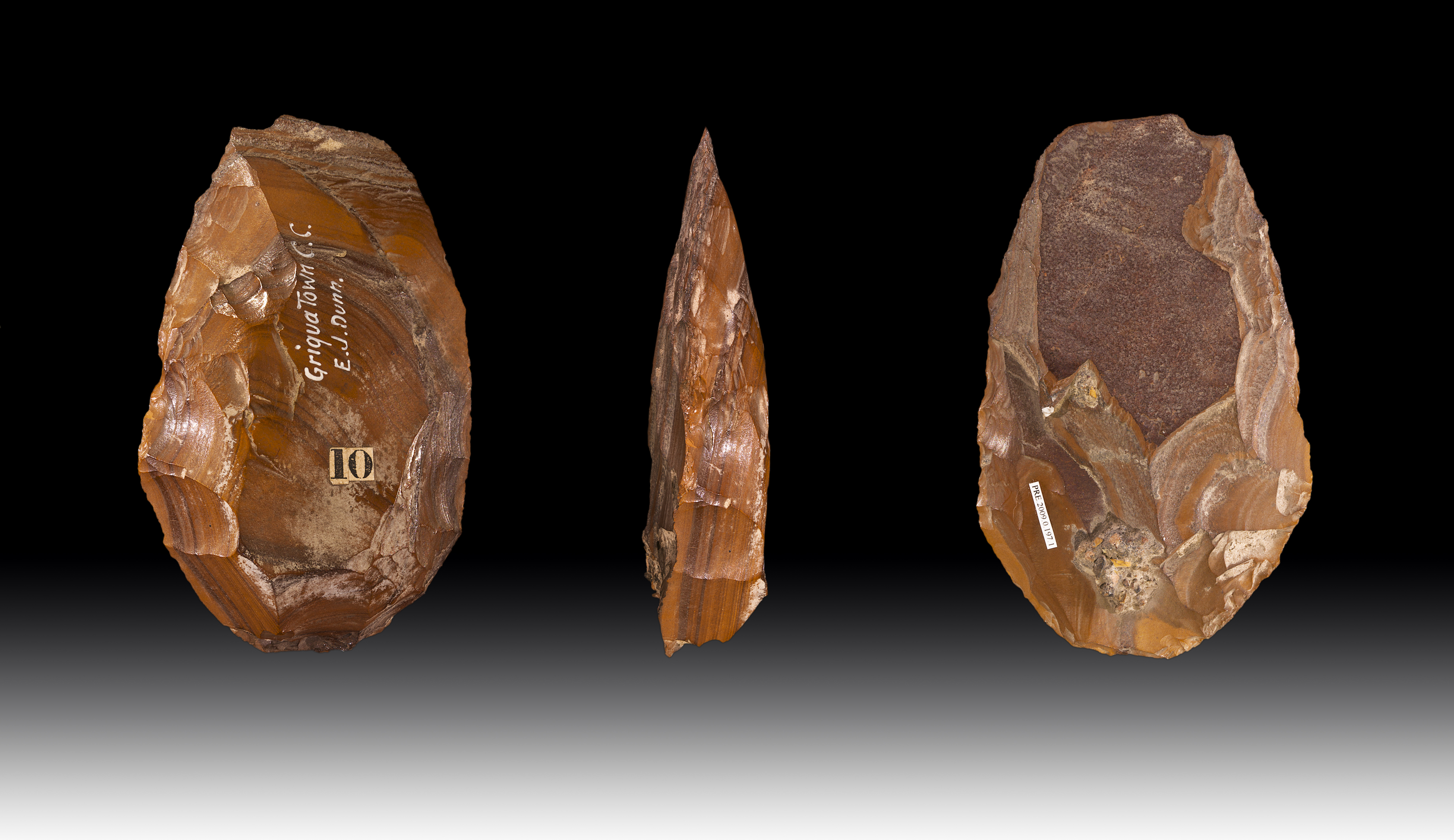
Biface Lower Paleolithic Former collection of Edward John Dunn - Museum of Toulouse

== Early life ==
Dunn was born at Bedminster near Bristol, England, the son of Edward Herbert Dunn and Betsy Robinson Dunn. The family emigrated to New South Wales in 1849, initially living near Goulburn, New South Wales then in Beechworth, Victoria from 1856. Dunn was educated at the Beechworth Church of England school and later by a tutor. Dunn was a collector of rocks and minerals from boyhood.

== Geological career ==
In 1871 Dunn returned to England, via South Africa, where he was government geologist for the Cape Colony.

During his lifetime Dunn built up a substantial library of books. As well as Australiana, he had many books on geology, anthropology and natural history.
