= Leonard Hawkes =

British geologist

Leonard Hawkes FRS (6 August 1891 – 29 October 1981) was a British geologist. Awarded the Murchison Medal in 1946 and the Wollaston Medal in 1962. He was head of the geology department at Bedford College, London between 1921 and 1956.
