= Gertrude Elles =

British geologist (1872–1960)

Gertrude Lilian Elles MBE
- Born: Gertrude Lilian Elles; 8 October 1872; Wimbledon, Surrey, England
- Died: 18 November 1960 (aged 88); Helensburgh, Scotland
- Education: Wimbledon High School; University of Cambridge; Trinity College Dublin
- Known for: Work on graptolites
- Awards: Murchison Medal
- Scientific career
- Fields: Geology
- Workplaces: University of Cambridge
- Academic advisors: Thomas McKenny Hughes; Charles Lapworth; John Edward Marr
- Doctoral students: Oliver Bulman; Dorothy Hill; Elizabeth Ripper

Gertrude Lilian Elles (/ˈɡɜːrtruːd ˈɛlɪs/; 8 October 1872 – 18 November 1960) was a British geologist, known for her work on graptolites.

== Personal life ==
Gertrude Elles was born on 8 October 1872. She was the youngest of six children and growing up was given the nickname "G" by her family. She was spoken of quite highly by the people around her and was described as having a wide range of love for music and always growing her knowledge of the world.

Every year, the Elles family would travel to the Morenish Estate near Killen to hunt grouse. During these family vacations, the young Gertrude fell in love with Scotland, especially the Highlands. Elles' love for geology evolved through exploration of the outdoors, museum visits, and field trips. Her interests allowed her to bond with family members such as her nephew whom she showed evidence of mechanical weathering by plants too along Moine Thrust. Elles' first introduction into geology as a formal practice was within her courses she took at Wimbledon High School which she attended from 1887 to 1891.

According to the Wimbledon High Digital archive in 1897 Volume No.2 Issue 9, Elles visited Sweden in 1896 by "steamer boat" and ported in Gothenburg, from there she traveled to Lund, Scania. While there she stayed with a non-English speaker and began to expand her Swedish vocabulary. Life in Lund differed from her experiences in England, such as meals being at 9 am, 3 pm and 8 pm, greetings before dining, and the absence of outdoor extra-curriculars due to the cold weather. Elles' adult life is marked by her dedication to contributing knowledge to the field of geology. She was a trailblazer for women in the field and an influential model for young female researchers. Her work accrued international acclaim in her lifetime and beyond. Elles remained unmarried but maintained a connection to her family and visited frequently in Scotland. In the last 35 years of her life she became increasingly deaf. She moved back to Scotland, where she died in 1960.

== Early education ==
According to articles from 1889-1891 issues of Wimbledon High Magazine, Elles played an active role in her high school community. She participated in several extracurricular activities, including secretary of the Tennis club, performing Arts in which she played Earl of Kent in King Lear the play, and the debate club. She was also a member of the Library and the School Union Committees. According to the Wimbledon Jubilee Magazine digital archives, in December 1889, in issue number one, Elles was declared the head of the chemistry section in the Natural Science Circle. Her proficiency in classes was noticed when she was awarded the Certificate of Merit, an award given by the Council of the Girls' Public Day School Company to those who achieved honours in four subjects, and given a scholarship in 1889. During the Oxford and Cambridge board exams held at the school in July of 1890, Elles was one of the students to have scored higher certificates and a Distinction in Geology. As you look through her life, you see the jack of all trades skills, Including her singing ability in which she performed a vocal solo to "The Sea hath its Pearls". Due to Elles' hard work, she received scholarships to Newnham College (Cambridge), which she attended, Somerville Hall (now Somerville College, Oxford) and Bedford College, London.

== Higher education ==
Elles attended Newnham College, University of Cambridge, in 1891 to study Natural Sciences, where she resided at Clough Hall. There, she met three other students: Ethel Skeat, Margaret Crosfield, and Ethel Wood, with whom she collaborated throughout her career. According to the Wimbledon High School digital archive in 1893, volume no.1, issue number 5, Elles was a secretary of the Natural Sciences Society, the Clough Hall Flower and a member of the Hockey Club committee. Continuing her time at Cambridge, Elles became president of the Natural Science Society, Vice-President of the Tennis Club, involved in the leadership of Sedgwick club, Lieutenant of the Clough Hall Fire Brigade and was a part of the running club. In 1894 Volume No.1, issue 6, the archives updated as Elles gained Second Class in Moral Sciences Tripos exams, became Secretary of Debating Society and a Secretary of State for War in the Liberal Unionist Cabinet. The archives were once again updated in 1895 Volume No.1, Issue 7, and it was added that with the Bathurst Studentship award, Elles was able to continue her studies for another year and was set to spend another year studying Geology in Sweden. As well in 1895, she passed her examinations for a BA honours in Natural Sciences and graduated with First Class Honours. At the time, Oxford and Cambridge refused to grant degrees to women so she did not receive a formal degree until 1905. Institutes such as the Universities of Cambridge, Oxford as well as Trinity College disallowed women to receive their degrees. This led to an accumulation of women, now known as the "steamboat ladies", who, between the years of 1904 and 1907, travelled to Dublin to be granted their degrees ad eundem. She was also awarded the Harkness Scholarship, open to resident members of Newnham and Girton Colleges, which was given out every three years and determined via an exam in Geology and Paleontology. She was one of the first three female members of the geological club and remained a member of the club until the day she died.

== Career ==
Elles was a field geologist, stratigrapher and paleontologist. Her work concerned the interpretation of graptolite zones of Lower Paleozoic strata. In the late 1890s, she worked with Ethel Wood on the preparation of British Graptolites, a monograph that was produced in parts over the next twenty years under the general editorship of Professor Charles Lapworth. The monograph was completed in 1918 and is still referenced by graptolite (colonial animal fossils) researchers today. In 1922, further work on the analysis of evolutionary patterns in graptolites by Elles was published by the Geologists' Association under the title: The graptolite faunas of the British Isles: A study in evolution. Her work on the taxonomy and evolution of graptolites, using material from North Wales and the Skiddaw Slates of the Lake District, England, and from the Wenlock Shales of the Welsh borders, was of fundamental importance. Elles was one of the first geologists to look beyond individual fossils and instead observed what was a community of specimens (Zone fossils). Although Elles is known for her research on graptolites she also conducted research and published numerous works on the stratigraphy of the Lower Palaeozoic, using graptolites as a tool to delineate time zones. In 1933 she published, ‘The stratigraphy and faunal succession in the Ordovician rocks of the Builth–Llandrindod inlier, Radnorshire’.

Elles, who pioneered female education, was a life member of the British Federation of University Women. Given that she worked in a field of research where men predominated, she welcomed the opportunities it afforded her to interact with other women. She routinely attended the Cambridge branch of the Federation, where she met several of her geology acquaintances, and she represented the organization at national gatherings. With this, she became the first female lecturer in the Department of Geology at the University of Cambridge in 1926. She was able to increase her network and influence among intellectually comparable women because of this involvement.

She became Vice-principal of Newnham College in 1930. She continued to lecture and research until her retirement in 1938. She was made Reader Emeritus in 1938, and continued to supervise students.

== Legacy ==
In 2018, the Paleontological Association introduced ‘The Gertrude Elles Award’ to promote high-quality engagement in the field of paleontology. The president of the Association said the following about the graptolite monograph (which could be regarded as her paramount legacy): "The work was encyclopedic in its coverage of the group and beautifully illustrated, with Elles working on the text and Wood focusing on the illustrations. With the taxonomy standardized, a detailed biozonal scheme could be established, which, in turn, enabled the global correlation of Lower Palaeozoic rocks. The work, almost invariably referred to simply as ‘Elles & Wood’, continues to be a benchmark and standard reference tool a century later."

In May of 1904, Elles’ paper on “The Highland loch” gained the attention of six female students; three as members of Sedgwick club (Miss Slater, Miss Drew, and Miss Pennycuick) and three were guests (Miss Craske, Miss Caulkin, and Miss J.M. Slater). The Combination Room at Newnham College served as the venue for the meeting. Interestingly, several club meetings took place in spaces that were seen as masculine spaces. At a time when Victorian society forbade the open mixing of the sexes, this was undoubtedly exceptional. Elles was there and may have served as a chaperone. Miss Robertson was also present as a participant. It would have been challenging for the women to attend a lecture in a private male residence without Elles being present. This was a stepping stone for a lot of the female researchers as it made them more confident to be in mixed-gender spaces.

Elles' excellence as a teacher is also notable. She was known as a great lecturer and was able to foster engagement in her courses. "One of her students commented: ‘She was a very stimulating teacher, and not only of members of the College – she was in great demand. She taught geological mapping in the Sedgwick: everybody went to that. She was marvellously clear and very, very fierce'". Some of the students that she supervised and mentored at Cambridge had significant careers in geology themselves, including Dorothy Hill, Elizabeth "Betty" Ripper and Oliver Bulman. Dorothy Hill was the first female professor at an Australian university and the first female president; Betty Ripper, worked on Australian graptolites and stromatoporoids; and Oliver Bulman, became the Woodwardian Professor of Geology in Cambridge".

== Awards and honours ==
- First Class Honours degree in Natural Science Tripos from Cambridge in 1895.
- Awarded the Lyell Fund of the Geological Society of London in 1900 for her work on graptolites.
- She received DSc at Trinity College Dublin in 1905.
- In 1919 she became one of the first female Fellows of the Geological Society, and in the same year won its Murchison Medal.
- She was awarded an MBE in 1920 for her work with the Red Cross during the First World War.
- She was president of the British Association in 1923.
- First woman to be awarded a readership position at Cambridge in 1924.

== Publications ==
The publications resulting from her research on graptolites were brought together in a book:

- Elles, G. L. & Wood, E. M. R. 1901–1918. Monograph of British Graptolites. Parts 1–11. Paleontological Society, London, Monographs, 1–539

Other papers that she authored or co-authored include:

- Elles, G. L. 1909. The relation of the Ordovician and Silurian rocks of Conway (North Wales). Quarterly Journal of the Geological Society, London, 65, 169–194.
- Elles, G. L. 1922. The graptolite faunas of the British Isles. Proceedings of the Geologists' Association, 33, 168–200
- Elles, G. L. 1922. The Bala country: its structure and rock succession. Quarterly Journal of the Geological Society, London, 78, 132–175.
- Elles, G. L. & Slater, I. L. 1906. The highest Silurian rocks of the Ludlow district. Quarterly Journal of the Geological Society, London, 62, 195– 221.
- Elles, G. L. & Wood, E. M. R. 1895. Supplementary notes on Drygill Shales. Geological Magazine, 2, 216–249.
- Elles G. L. (1904). Some graptolite zones in the arenig rocks of wales. Geological magazine.
- Elles G. L. (1931). The study of geological maps. (second edition.).
- Strachan I. Elles G. L. & Wood E. M. R. (1971). A synoptic supplement to "a monograph of british graptolites by miss g.l. elles and miss e.m.r. wood". Palaeontographical Society.
- Elles G. L. (1898). Collected papers. Retrieved December 11 2022 from hathitrust.org.

== Sources ==
- Administrator (6 November 2018). "Cambridge women pioneers in Earth Sciences". www.esc.cam.ac.uk.
- "Wimbledon High School | Digital Archives". wimbledonhighschool.daisy.websds.net.
- "Steamboat ladies", Wikipedia, 24 July 2024
