= George Hoole Mitchell =

British geologist

George Hoole Mitchell CBE FRS FRSE FGS

Personal details
- Born: 31 December 1902 Liverpool, England
- Died: 11 March 1976 (aged 73) Greenock, Strathclyde, Scotland
- Occupation: Geologist

George Hoole Mitchell (31 December 1902 – 11 March 1976) was a British geologist. He won the Geological Society of London's Bigsby Medal in 1947. He was Assistant Director of the Geological Survey of Great Britain from 1959 to 1967.

== Life ==
He was born in Liverpool on 31 December 1902, the son of George Richard Mitchell, a pewterer (1874-1965), and his wife Emma France, daughter of Hoole France. He was educated at Liverpool Collegiate School. He studied Science at the University of Liverpool graduating BSc in 1924 and gaining an MSc in 1925. He gained a doctorate (PhD) in 1927.

He joined the British Geological Survey in 1929 and rose to the level of Assistant Director.

In 1953 he was elected a Fellow of the Royal Society of London. In 1955 he was elected a Fellow of the Royal Society of Edinburgh. His proposers were Archibald Gordon MacGregor, Sir Edward Battersby Bailey, Murray Macgregor, James Phemister and John Knox. He served as the Society's Vice President 1964 to 1967. He was President of the Yorkshire Geological Society 1954 to 1956 and of the Edinburgh Geological Society 1961 to 1963.

In 1967 he was created a Commander of the Order of the British Empire by Queen Elizabeth II.

He died in hospital in Greenock on 11 March 1976.

== Family ==
In 1930 he married Vera Margaret Richardson.

== Publications ==
- Geology of the Country around Wakefield (1940)
- Geology of the Country around Barnsley (1947)
- Edinburgh Geology (1960)
- The Lake District (1970)
