= Herbert Harold Read =

British geologist

Herbert Harold Read FRS
- Born: 17 December 1889
- Died: 29 March 1970 (aged 80)
- Education: University of London
- Spouse: Edith Browning
- Awards: Fellow of the Royal Society (1939); Wollaston Medal (1952); Royal Medal (1963); Penrose Medal (1967)
- Scientific career
- Fields: Geology
- Workplaces: British Geological Survey; University of Liverpool; Imperial College, London
- Doctoral students: Janet Vida Watson; John Sutton; Derek Flinn

Herbert Harold Read FRS, FRSE, FGS, (17 December 1889, in Whitstable – 29 March 1970) was a British geologist and Professor of Geology at Imperial College. From 1947-1948 he was president of the Geological Society.

== Life ==
He was born at Whitstable in Kent on 17 December 1889 the son of Herbert Read, a dairy farmer, and his wife, Caroline Mary Kearn. He attended St Alphege Church School in Whitstable then Simon Langton Grammar School for Boys in Canterbury. He then studied Sciences at the University of London, graduating BSc in 1911.

In the First World War he served in the Royal Fusiliers seeing active service on the Somme and at Gallipoli. He was invalided out of service in 1917 and returned to HM Geological Survey (Scottish section), where he had begun briefly in 1914. He stayed with the survey until 1931.

In 1927 he was elected a Fellow of the Royal Society of Edinburgh. His proposers were John Horne, Sir John Smith Flett, Murray Macgregor and Sir Edward Battersby Bailey. From 1931 to 1939 he was Professor of Geology at Liverpool University.

He was elected a Fellow of the Royal Society in 1939 and won its Royal Medal in 1963 for "outstanding contributions to the understanding of the processes of rock metamorphism and the origins of granite". He also was awarded the Bigsby Medal in 1935, the Wollaston Medal in 1952 and the Penrose Medal of the Geological Society of America in 1967. He served as Dean of the Royal School of Mines from 1943-45.

He was Chairman of the Scientific Committee and member of the Committee of Management of the Commonwealth Trans-Antarctic Expedition, 1955–58. The Read Mountains in the Shackleton Range of Antarctica are named after him.

He died on 29 March 1970. In 1917 he had married Edith Browning.

== Publications ==
- British Regional Geology: The Grampian Highlands. Second edition (1948) revised by A.G. MacGregor
- Geology: An Introduction to Earth History (1949)
- The Granite Controversy (1957)
- Beginning Geology (1966)
- Later Stages of Earth History (1975)

== Quotes ==
"The best geologist is he who has seen the most rocks." (H. H. Read, 1940)
