= Clifford Scott (psychoanalyst) =

Canadian psychoanalyst (1903–1997)

William Clifford Munro Scott
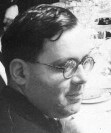
- Born: March 11, 1903; Metz, Ontario
- Died: January 19, 1997 (aged 93); Montreal
- Education: University of Toronto
- Occupation: psychoanalyst

William Clifford Munro Scott (March 11, 1903 – January 19, 1997) was a Canadian psychoanalyst. He was briefly president of the British Psychoanalytical Society in 1953, and subsequently became the first president of the Canadian Psychoanalytical Society. He was one of Melanie Klein's analysands.

His papers are held at the Library and Archives Canada.
