= Walter Frederick Whittard =

- Born: 1902
- Died: 1966
- Awards: Fellow of the Royal Society; Murchison Medal (1965)
- Scientific career
- Fields: Geology
- Institutions: University of Bristol

Walter Frederick Whittard (1902–1966) was professor of geology at the University of Bristol.

== Awards and honours ==
Whittard received the Murchison Medal of the Geological Society of London in 1965 and was elected a Fellow of the Royal Society.
