= William Pugh (geologist) =

British geologist (1892–1974)

Sir William Pugh OBE FRS
- Born: William John Pugh; 28 June 1892; Westbury, Shropshire, UK
- Died: 18 March 1974 (aged 81); London, England
- Awards: Knight Bachelor, (1956); OBE, (1919); Croix de Guerre, Fellow of the Royal Society, (1951); Murchison Medal, (1952)
- Scientific career
- Fields: Geology

Sir William John Pugh (28 June 1892 – 18 March 1974) was a British geologist who was director of the Geological Survey of Great Britain and of the Museum of Practical Geology, Department of Scientific and Industrial Research.

He was born in Westbury, Shropshire, the only son of coal merchant John Pugh and educated at Welshpool County School and the University College of Wales, Aberystwyth, where he graduated BA in Geography in 1914. However, he was inspired to study geology by Professor Owen Thomas Jones. In 1915, they presented their first joint study (of the geology of the area around Machynlleth) to the Geological Society of London.

During World War I, he served with the Royal Welch Fusiliers as a staff officer, rising to the rank of major. He was appointed an Officer of the Order of the British Empire (OBE) in the 1919 New Year Honours, awarded the French Croix de Guerre and was twice mentioned in despatches.

After the war he returned to University College as Professor of Geology from 1919 to 1931, acting as Dean of the Faculty of Science from 1929 to 1931. During this time he carried out field studies to map the chronostratigraphy of the ancient Ordovician-Silurian rocks of the Corris and Bala districts and in 1928 was awarded a DSc by the University of Wales.

In 1931, he was appointed Professor of Geology and Director of the Geological Laboratories at the University of Manchester, a post he held until 1950. He served as Dean of the Faculty of Science there from 1939 to 1941, as Pro-Vice Chancellor from 1941 to 1943, and as Deputy Vice-Chancellor from 1943 to 1950. As a member of the Inter-University Council for Higher Education in the Colonies he went to Malaya in 1947 with the Commission on Higher Education to advise on university development there. He was elected president of Section C (Geology) of the British Association for the Advancement of Science (1948–49).

In 1951, he was made Emeritus Professor when he resigned to become Director of the Geological Survey of Great Britain and of the Museum of Practical Geology (1951–60). He commenced the task of producing a geological map of the country and was also responsible for the Water Department and the Atomic Energy Division. The activities of the institution included the undertaking of field studies in six other countries across the world for the Atomic Energy Division and an aeromagnetic survey of England and Wales, which involved surveying the Cheshire salt fields and the mapping of coalfields and advisory work for the National Coal Board, the Scottish Hydro-electric Board and the Ministry of Housing. He published many papers in scientific journals reporting on the progress of this work.

== Honours and awards ==
Pugh was elected to membership of the Manchester Literary and Philosophical Society in 1931 giving his details as - Professor W. J. Pugh, O.B.E., B.A., D.Sc., F.G.S., Geological Survey and Museum, Exhibition Road, London, S.W.7. He was elected a Fellow of the Royal Society in 1951 for his contributions to the advancement of geological sciences and awarded the Murchison Medal by the Geological Society of London in 1952 for his studies on the stratigraphy and tectonics of the lower Palaeozoic Rocks of Wales. He was knighted in the 1956 Birthday Honours. He was President of the Aberystwyth Old Students' Association in 1964–65.

== Private life ==
He retired in 1960 and died in London in 1974. He had married in 1919 Manon Clayton Davies Bryan, the second daughter of Joseph Davies Bryan of Alexandria, Egypt. They had four sons.

Professional and academic associations
Preceded by Prof. David James Llewelfryn Davies	President of the Aberystwyth Old Students' Association; 1964–65	Succeeded by Dr Walter Idris Jones
