= William Whitehead Watts =

British geologist (1860–1947)

William Whitehead Watts FRS HonFRSE FGS
- Born: 7 June 1860; Shropshire, England
- Died: 30 July 1947 (aged 87)

Academic background
- Education: Denstone College; Sidney Sussex College, Cambridge

Academic work
- Discipline: Geologist
- Sub-discipline: Petrology; petrography; stratigraphy; pre-Cambrian
- Institutions: Cambridge University Extension Scheme; Mason Science College; University of Oxford; British Geological Survey; University of Birmingham; Imperial College London

William Whitehead Watts FRS HFRSE FGS FMS LLD (7 June 1860 – 30 July 1947) was a British geologist.

== Life ==
He was born near Broseley in Shropshire, the eldest of two sons of Isaac Watts, not the hymnwriter of that name but a music master, and his wife, Maria Whitehead, daughter of a farmer.

He was educated at Bitterley and Shifnal Grammar Schools then went to Denstone College. He then studied Sciences at Sidney Sussex College, Cambridge, and was a member of the Sedgwick Club. He gained first class honours in geology in 1881, graduated BA in 1882 and MA in 1885, and became ScD in 1909. He was a fellow of Sidney Sussex 1888-94. He lectured for the Cambridge University Extension Scheme for ten years. He began to study the geology of Shropshire and his first paper on the subject was published in 1885.

He worked with Charles Lapworth on Shelve and the Corndon and taught at Mason College (which later became Birmingham University) during Lapworth's absence.

He taught geology at the University of Oxford from 1888, then in 1891 he joined the Geological Survey, working first in Ireland and then on Charnwood Forest. He taught at Mason College and Birmingham University from 1897 to 1906, when he accepted the chair of geology at the Imperial College of Science and Technology, South Kensington. Watts served as secretary (1898–1909) and as president (1910–12) of the Geological Society.

Professor Watts was elected a Fellow of the Royal Society in 1904.

In 1910 he succeeded William Johnson Sollas as President of the Geological Society of London. He was succeeded in turn in 1912 by Aubrey Strahan.

He won the Murchison Medal (1915) and the Wollaston Medal of the Geological Society. In 1934 he was elected an Honorary Fellow of the Royal Society of Edinburgh.

He retired in 1930 and died on 30 July 1947 aged 87.

== Publications ==
He edited British Geological Photographs

- Geology for Beginners (1898)
- Shropshire, the Geography of the County (1919)
- Geology of the Ancient Rocks of Charnwood Forest (1947)

== Family ==
He married twice, firstly in 1891 to Louisa Adelaide Atchison, who died in 1894, then he married Rachel Atchison (nee Rodgers) the widowed sister-in-law of his first wife.
