= Frederic William Harmer =

Frederic William Harmer (24 April 1835 – 24 April 1923) was an English amateur geologist, palaeontologist, and naturalist.

He was born in Norwich and was educated at Norwich Grammar School.

In his early years he had only scanty leisure to devote to geology, but a chance encounter with the younger Searles Wood was the beginning of a long-continued geological partnership. The map they prepared of the glacial deposits of Norfolk and Suffolk on a scale of 1 inch to the mile was the first 'drift' map of the kind in the world. After the publication of much valuable material on the Pleistocene deposits of the east of England, came Wood's death in 1884.

Harmer was the mayor of Norwich in 1887–1888 and served there as an alderman from 1880 to 1902. After about a decade of inactivity in geological work, he presented in 1895 at the meeting of the British Association at Ipswich two important papers on the Coralline and Red Crags. From 1895 until his death, he actively pursued field work in geology. He was awarded the Murchison Medal in 1902.

He made extensive investigations of the Pliocene and Pleistocene deposits in England's eastern and midland counties, as well as those deposits in Belgium and the Netherlands. The Société géologique de Belgique elected him an honorary member. The University of Cambridge conferred upon him an honorary M.A.

He married Mary Young Lyon in 1860. The marriage produced several children, among whom were the surgeon William Douglas Harmer and the zoologist Sir Sidney Frederic Harmer.
