= Tom Eastwood (geologist) =

British geologist (1888 – 1970)

- Born: 1888; Burnley
- Died: 28 March 1970 (aged 81–82)
- Education: Royal College of Science, London (BSc)
- Awards: Murchison Medal (1950)
- Scientific career
- Fields: Geology
- Workplaces: British Geological Survey

Tom (Tommy) Eastwood (1888 – 28 March 1970) was a British geologist, who worked for the British Geological Survey for most of his career. He was best known for his work on rocks of Carboniferous age and was awarded the Murchison Medal of the Geological Society of London in 1950.

== Life and works ==
Eastwood was born in Burnley, Lancashire in 1888. He studied geology at the Royal College of Science, and first joined the Geological Survey in 1911. He began his career as a field geologist, working in the coal fields of Warwickshire and Staffordshire. During World War 1, he served in France with the Royal Army Medical Corps. After the war, Eastwood returned to work on the mineral resources of the United Kingdom. He was posted to the new Cumberland unit of the geological survey in 1922, where he joined Bernard Smith, Frederick Murray Trotter, Ernest Dixon and Sydney Ewart Hollingworth, among others.

In 1939, Eastwood was appointed assistant director for England and Wales. After retiring from the survey in 1949, he worked as a consulting geologist for Craelius and Co. In 1949, Eastwood featured on Pathe News, in a news item reporting the discovery of 400,000,000 tonnes of coal beneath Lichfield. In 1965, Eastwood donated a collection of his books, maps and reports to start the library of the Cumbria Geological Society.

== Professional service and awards ==
Eastwood became a life member of the Yorkshire Geological Society in 1932. From 1943 to 1945, he was vice-president of the Geological Society of London. Eastwood was president of the Geologists' Association from 1950 to 1952 and was elected an honorary member in 1962.

== Family ==
Eastwood married in 1915.
