= George Malcolm Brown =

British geologist

Sir George Malcolm Brown, FRS (5 October 1925 – 27 March 1997) was one of the most respected geologists of the second half of the twentieth century. His formidable reputation as an igneous petrologist enabled him to become one of the few scientists invited by NASA to work on the Moon rock samples recovered from the Apollo 11 lunar mission.

== Early life ==
Brown was born in Redcar and was educated at Coatham School. Following a period in the RAF, he entered the geology department of Durham University in 1947, graduating with First Class Honours in 1950. The Professor of Geology, Lawrence Wager, recognised Brown's abilities, and took him with him as a research student following his move to the Chair in Geology at Oxford University. Brown's research centred on the ultrabasic complex of Rhum, Scotland and built upon earlier work undertaken by W.A. Deer and L.R. Wager. He received his D.Phil in 1954.

== Academic career ==
Expeditions to Greenland to research the Skaergaard intrusion led Brown to a one-year Harkness Fellowship at Princeton University. He returned to the UK in 1955 as a lecturer at Oxford University where his research involved the igneous intrusions of Skye, Scotland. He returned to Durham University as Professor of Geology in 1967, which served to strengthen that department's already enviable reputation. It was during his time at Durham that Brown was invited by NASA to undertake work on the Apollo 11 lunar samples. A story told to Durham geology undergraduates is that Brown accidentally left the box containing the samples on a train from London, only later to discover that NASA had delivered the genuine samples by secure delivery direct to Durham. The true story is that after appearing on the TV programme Tomorrow's World, Brown's train from London to Durham broke down at Darlington, and he had to travel by police escort to Durham. This prompted local newspaper headlines "Americans transport moon rock 250,000 miles, BR (British Rail) couldn't take it 14 miles from Darlington to Durham"

His work on the lunar samples secured his worldwide reputation. Like another Durham University geologist before him, Kingsley Dunham, Brown was appointed director of the Institute of Geological Sciences in 1979. During a very difficult time for this Government institution, Brown successfully led a move of its headquarters from London to a site at Keyworth, near Nottingham, and the start of a new chapter for the institute as the newly-titled 'British Geological Survey'. He was knighted upon retirement in 1985.

== Honours ==
Brown received many awards and honours. He was elected a Fellow of the Royal Society in 1975. He also received several honorary doctorates from British Universities and was awarded the Murchison Medal of the Geological Society of London. His early work with Lawrence Wager led to publication of Layered Igneous Rocks, which even today remains an influential text.
