= Robert Etheridge =

Robert Etheridge may refer to:

- Robert Etheridge (geologist) (1819–1903), English geologist and palaeontologist.
- Robert Etheridge, Junior (1847–1920), his son, British palaeontologist
- Robert Etheridge (born 1991), better known as Dimension (musician), English DJ, record producer and musician
- Bobby Etheridge (Robert James Etheridge, 1934–1988), English footballer

== See also ==
- Bob Etheridge (born 1941), American politician, U.S. representative from North Carolina
- Bobby Etheridge (baseball) (1941–2015), American baseball third baseman
- Robbie Ethridge (born 1955), American anthropologist and author
