= Ernest Edward Leslie Dixon =

British geologist

- Born: 1876
- Died: 9 April 1963
- Education: Royal College of Science
- Awards: Murchison Medal (1936)
- Scientific career
- Fields: Geology
- Workplaces: British Geological Survey

Ernest Edward Leslie Dixon was a British geologist, who worked for the British Geological Survey for his whole career. He was best known for his geological investigations in South Wales, and was awarded the Murchison Medal of the Geological Society of London in 1936.

== Life and works ==
Dixon grew up in London, and went to school at the City of London School. He studied geology at the Royal College of Science, graduating with a first class BSc. He joined the British Geological Survey in 1899, and worked with the survey until he retired in 1938. In his time with the survey, Dixon published many papers, reports and maps based on his field work across England and Wales. During World War 1, Dixon served in France as a Lieutenant with the Royal Garrison Artillery. Along with Bernard Smith, Frederick Murray Trotter and Tom Eastwood, Dixon was one of the early staff of the survey office established in Whitehaven in the 1920s.

== Awards ==
Dixon was awarded the Murchison fund of the Geological Society of London in 1913, and the Murchison Medal in 1936. He was also awarded the Foulerton award of the Geologists' Association in 1939.
