= W. F. P. McLintock =

20th-century Scottish geologist

William Francis Porter McLintock CB FRSE (2 February 1887 – 21 February 1960) was a 20th-century Scottish geologist and museum curator, serving both at the Royal Scottish Museum and the Natural History Museum, London. He was also director of the Geological Survey of Great Britain from 1945-1950.

== Life ==
He was born on 2 February 1887 the son of Peter Buchanan McLintock, a laundry owner at Deanbank in Stockbridge, Edinburgh. He was educated at George Heriot's School then studied science at the University of Edinburgh, graduating with a BSc in 1907. After University McLintock immediately started work as a geologist with the Geological Survey of Great Britain under Ben Peach and John Horne. In 1911 he became Curator of the Geological Specimens at the Royal Scottish Museum. In 1921 he moved to London to the Natural History Museum. In 1930 he was involved in the relocation of the museum from Jermyn Street to South Kensington.

In 1916 he was elected a Fellow of the Royal Society of Edinburgh. His proposers were John Horne, Ben Peach, Sir John Smith Flett and Arthur Pillans Laurie.

In 1936 he stood in as Acting Director of the Geological Survey after the unexpected death of Bernard Smith (geologist), and pending the appointment of Edward Battersby Bailey. In the Second World War he was seconded to the Atomic Energy Division of the survey (seeking sources of Uranium). In 1945, he was appointed Director of the Geological Survey, a post he held until retirement.

He retired in 1950 and died in Edinburgh on 21 February 1960. He was invested Companion of the Order of the Bath (CB) in the 1951 New Year Honours.

== Family ==
He married late in life, in 1939 (aged 52) a widow, Mrs Maude Alice Marshall.

== Publications ==
- Guide Collection of Gemstones
