= Bally (surname) =

Bally is a surname. Notable people with the surname include:

- Albert W. Bally (fl. 1988), American geologist
- Charles Bally (1865–1947), Swiss linguist
- Étienne Bally (1923–2018), French sprinter

== See also ==
- Bally (disambiguation)
