= Beris Cox =

British biostratigrapher and palaeontologist

- Born: 2 August 1948; London, England
- Died: 19 February 2023 (aged 74)
- Education: Swansea University; University of London
- Scientific career
- Fields: Geology, stratigraphy, palæontology
- Workplaces: British Geological Survey (BGS)

Beris Mary Cox (2 August 1948 – 19 February 2023) was a British biostratigrapher and palaeontologist. She specialised in Jurassic era invertebrate macrofaunas, particularly ammonites, in the context of biozonization and chronostratigraphy.

== Biography ==
Cox was born in London, England. She studied geology at the University of Wales, Swansea, graduating in 1969, and later completed her PhD, awarded by University of London, in 1981. She researched Callovian perisphinctid ammonites for her thesis.

In 1969, Cox was appointed to the role of palaeontologist by the Institute of Geological Sciences (IGS), later known as the British Geological Survey (BGS), and was one of the first women to be appointed to the scientific grades of that organisation.

Cox was a Fellow of the Geological Society of London and a Chartered Geologist, and was also a council member of the Palaeontological Association and editor of their journal Palaeontology until 1999. She was a council member of the Palaeontographical Society and editor of their Monographs 2008-2018, and was their Vice-President from 2015 until 2017. She was also a council member and Indoor Meetings Secretary for the East Midlands Geological Society 2001-2008, and was a council member and Treasurer of the Geological Society's History of Geology Group (HOGG) and editor of HOGG Newsletter 2007-2019. She was also a member of the Geological Curators' Group, the Geologists' Association and Yorkshire Geological Society.

Some of Cox's most notable scholarly papers introduced the concept of bed recognition and regional correlation in Jurassic mudstones by combining palaeontological, lithological, and sedimentological approaches. She contributed to over 70 publications during her career, including numerous British Geological Survey reports and Memoirs, as well as Unlocking the Stratigraphical Record: Advances in Modern Stratigraphy. She co-authored the Geological Conservation Review volumes on British Middle and Upper Jurassic stratigraphy.
