= Richard Hardman =

British geologist

Richard Frederick Paynter Hardman, CBE (born 1936) is a British geologist and a leading applied petroleum geologist. He was the President of the Geological Society of London, 1996 – 1998 and Chair of the Petroleum Society of Great Britain. In a career spanning over 40 years, he worked in oil and gas exploration as a geologist in Libya, Kuwait, Colombia, Norway, and the North Sea with companies including BP, Amoco and Amerada Hess. Working as an Oil & Gas Drilling & Exploration consultant, he was later Executive Director, Exploration at Regal Petroleum (2005–2006), Atlantic Petroleum UK, and a Director of FX Energy, Inc., based in Salt Lake City, US, since 2003.

He was appointed a Commander of the Order of the British Empire (CBE) in the 1998 New Year Honours, for "services to the oil and gas industries", and was awarded the William Smith Medal by the Geological Society in 2003.

== Career ==
Starting his career with BP, where after working for ten years, he joined Amoco in 1969, where he became known for North Sea oil and gas exploration. He worked with the company for next 11 years, before joining Superior Oil for three years and finally 18 years at Amerada Hess to become its vice president of exploration till 2001.

He is now an oil and gas exploration consultant and since 2001 as a senior consultant to various oil and gas companies, including Enterprise Oil, Neptune, FX Energy Inc and Atlantic Petroleum UK Limited and executive director, Exploration at Regal Petroleum (2005–06).

He is the former chairman of both the Petroleum Group of the Geological Society and the Petroleum Exploration Society of Great Britain and the former president of the Geological Society. He was formerly chairman of the Science and Innovation Strategy Board of the Natural Environment Research Council, and also a trustee of the UK based education charity Oil Depletion Analysis Centre established in 2001.
