= William Topley =

William Topley may refer to:

- William James Topley (1845–1931), Canadian photographer
- William Topley (geologist) (1841–1894), British geologist
- William Whiteman Carlton Topley (1886–1944), British bacteriologist
- William Topley (musician), British musician
