= Frederick Murray Trotter =

British geologist (1897 – 1968)

- Born: 19 April 1897; Gateshead
- Died: 24 July 1968 (aged 71); Awre, Gloucestershire
- Education: Rutherford College, Newcastle
- Alma mater: Armstrong College (B.Sc., 1920)
- Awards: Murchison Medal (1956); Sorby Medal (1967)
- Scientific career
- Fields: Field geology
- Workplaces: British Geological Survey

Frederick Murray Trotter (19 April 1897 – 24 July 1968) was a British geologist, who worked for his whole career with the British Geological Survey. He became best known for his geological field studies of industrial minerals – coal, salt and iron ores – and was awarded the Murchison Medal of the Geological Society of London in 1956.

== Life and works ==
Trotter was born in Gateshead, and grew up in Durham and Newcastle. He was educated at Rutherford College of Technology, and then went to Armstrong College, Newcastle, to study chemistry and geology. During the First World War, from 1916 to 1918 Trotter served as a corporal with the Royal Engineers corps of signals as a despatch rider. In 1918, he was hit by shrapnel while on duty near Vimy in France. This caused him to lose one eye and a part of his skull.

He recovered and returned to his studies of geology at Armstrong College, where he was taught by George Lebour, Franklin Sibly, David Woolacott and Leonard Hawkes. Trotter graduated with a B.Sc degree in 1920. In 1921, Trotter joined the British Geological Survey, starting in their Whitehaven office. There, he worked under Bernard Smith, who was later to become director of the survey. Trotter soon began to work with Sydney Hollingworth on the glacial geology around Brampton. Trotter focused on the glacial deposits of eastern Edenside, while Hollingworth focused on the western deposits. Both were awarded the D.Sc degrees for their studies. Trotter published his work in 1929, and their joint monograph on Brampton was published in 1932. Trotter worked for the survey for the rest of his career, and by the time he retired in 1963, he had reached the position of assistant director (England and Wales). During his career he worked first on the glacial deposits of the Eden valley, and later on the coal fields of South Wales and Lancashire; the salt fields of Cheshire, and hematite ore mineralisation of Cumbria. He published many geological reports, maps and monographs through his career.

== Awards ==
Trotter received the Lyell Fund in 1938 for his geological researches on the glacial and post-glacial phenomena of the Eden Valley. In 1956, he was awarded the Murchison Medal from the Geological Society of London, and in 1967 he was awarded the Sorby Medal of the Yorkshire Geological Society.

== Selected publications ==
- Trotter, F. M. & Hollingworth, S. E. (1932) The geology of the Brampton district. Geological Survey of Great Britain. London : H.M. Stationery Office 223 pp.
- Trotter, F. M. (1936) Gosforth district. Geological Survey of Great Britain. London : H.M. Stationery Office 136 pp.
- Trotter, F. M. & Rose, W. C. C. (1942), Geology of the Forest of Dean coal and iron-ore field. Geological Survey of Great Britain. London : H.M.S.O. 95pp.
- Edwards, W. N. & Trotter, F. M. (1954) British regional geology. The Pennines and adjacent areas. 3rd edition. Geological Survey of Great Britain. London : H.M.S.O. 86 pp.
