= Eileen Hendriks =

English geologist

- Born: Eileen Mary Lind Hendriks; 3 November 1887; Birmingham, Warwickshire, England
- Died: 13 October 1978 (aged 90); Cornwall, England
- Occupation: Geologist

Eileen Mary Lind Hendriks (1887–1978) was an English geologist specialising in the geology of Devon and Cornwall. In 1930, she attempted to become the first female geologist employed by the Geological Survey of Great Britain, but her application was unsuccessful. Despite this, she maintained her geological research, and was elected a Fellow of the Geological Society in 1945. In 1943, the Geological Survey appointed Eileen Guppy as its first female geologist. A testimonial from O. T. Jones, Woodwardian Professor of Geology at the University of Cambridge, held in the British Geological Survey Archive, described Hendriks as having "had a very good training and is extremely enthusiastic, but has received very little encouragement in her work, and has, in fact, suffered from a good deal of discouragement from some."

== Early life ==
Hendriks was born in Birmingham, Warwickshire on 3 November 1887, the daughter of Henry and Helena Hendricks. Her father was an estate agent and surveyor. She was privately educated and showed an early interest in geology when she attended public lectures by Charles Lapworth in Birmingham.

== Geologist ==
Hendriks graduated from the Aberystwyth University in 1919 with a BSc, later completing a PhD at Imperial College London. Between 1926 and 1928 she was temporarily employed by the Geological Survey of Great Britain to assist in the preparation of a catalogue of the Survey's photographs. This work resulted in the publication, in 1928, of Classified Geological Photographs: From the Collection of the Geological Survey of Great Britain.

Little is known about her career away from the Geological Survey, but archive material indicates that she found it difficult to find paid work as a geologist. In a letter written in 1941, held in the British Geological Survey Archive, she referred to “the absolute dearth of openings in her main subject”. Despite this, she maintained her geological research, and was elected a Fellow of the Geological Society in 1945.

She worked extensively on the geology of Devon and Cornwall, publishing a number of papers up until the 1970s on aspects of geological structure, lithostratigraphy and palaeontology. In 1949 she was awarded the Bolitho Medal of the Royal Geological Society of Cornwall. In 1958 she was awarded the Lyell Fund from the Geological Society given to scientists based on the significance of their published research. In 1965 she was awarded the R H Worth prize by the Geological Society of London, given to reward those who make distinguished contributions to geology as amateurs.

Hendriks left an extensive archive of personal and professional material to the British Geological Survey. The Hendriks collection includes geological notebooks, geological diagrams and notes, university certificates, correspondence from the 1890s to the 1970s, testimonials, diaries, photographs and watercolour paintings, including a self-portrait.

== Publications ==
- — (1937). "Rock succession and structure in South Cornwall: a revision. With notes on the central European facies and Variscan folding there present". Quarterly Journal of the Geological Society of London. 93 (3): 322–367. Bibcode:1937QJGS...93..322H. doi:10.1144/GSL.JGS.1937.093.01-04.13. S2CID 140629672.
- — (1951). "Geological succession and structure in western south Devonshire". Transactions of the Royal Geological Society of Cornwall. 18: 255–308.
- — (1959). "A summary of present views on the structure of Cornwall and Devon". Geological Magazine. 96 (3): 253–257. Bibcode:1959GeoM...96..253H. doi:10.1017/s0016756800060246. S2CID 128751514.
- — (1960). "Evidence of large scale northward-directed thrusting". Royal Geological Society of Cornwall: Abstracts of the Proceedings of the Third Conference of Geologists and Geomorphologists Working in the Southwest of England.
- — (1966). "Correlation of South and North Cornwall". Proceedings of the Ussher Society. 1 (5).
- —; House, M R; Rhodes, F H T (1971). "Evidence bearing on the stratigraphical successions in south Cornwall". Proceedings of the Usherr Society. 2: 270–275.
