= Kingsley Dunham =

British geologist

Sir Kingsley Dunham FRS FGS FRSE
- Born: 2 January 1910; Sturminster Newton, Dorset, England
- Died: 5 April 2001 (aged 91); Durham, England
- Education: PhD Hatfield College, 1932; ScD Harvard University, 1935
- Spouse: Margaret Dunham (m. 1936; died 1998)
- Children: 1
- Awards: Sorby Medal (YGS) (1963); Royal Medal (1970); Bolitho Medal (1973); Wollaston Medal (1976)
- Scientific career
- Fields: Geology, mineralogy
- Institutions: University of Durham; British Geological Survey (Director 1967–1975)
- Theses: The Ore Deposits of the North Pennines: A Genetic Study (1932); The Geology of the Organ Mountains with an Account of the Geology and Mineral Resources of Doña Ana County, New Mexico (1935)
- Doctoral advisor: Arthur Holmes

Sir Kingsley Charles Dunham FRS FGS FRSE (2 January 1910 – 5 April 2001) was one of the leading British geologists and mineralogists of the 20th century. He was a Professor of Geology at the University of Durham from 1950 to 1971. He was later Professor Emeritus from 1967 to 2001. He was director of the British Geological Survey from 1967 to 1975.

== Early life ==
Dunham was born in Sturminster Newton, Dorset and moved at an early age with his family to Durham. He attended the Durham Johnston School (then a Grammar School) and then won a Foundation Scholarship to Hatfield College, Durham, graduating with a first-class degree in geology in 1930 at a time when Arthur Holmes was professor.

A gifted musician, Dunham was Organ Scholar during his undergraduate days. Following graduation, he pursued research into the Pennine Orefield of the North of England, under the supervision of Arthur Holmes. He graduated with a PhD in 1932 on the subject of Ore deposits of the north Pennines.

== Career ==
Dunham studied at Harvard University under a Commonwealth Fund Fellowship, which led to a master's degree. He returned to the UK as a geologist for the British Geological Survey, working on the iron ores of Cumbria. This came in useful during the Second World War, where he was involved in the investigation of the mineral resources of the North of England. This work was later published in the classic volume, The Geology of the North Pennine Orefield.

Dunham returned to Durham University in 1950 as Professor of Geology. During his tenure, he supervised the drilling of the Rookhope borehole, discovering, as predicted by his colleague Martin Bott, the presence of a concealed granite underlying the Pennines. He was created a Fellow of St John's College, Durham.

In 1967, his career culminated in accepting the directorship of the British Geological Survey, and like his time at Durham, he successfully guided that institution through a period of rapid growth into areas such as geophysics, oceanography and geochemistry. He was knighted in 1972.

Following retirement in 1975, Dunham again returned to Durham as Emeritus Professor, publishing further work on the mineralogy of the North of England.

== Honours ==
Dunham was elected a Fellow of the Royal Society in 1955, later served on its council, and received its Royal Medal in 1970. He was President of the Yorkshire Geological Society between 1958 and 1959, and was awarded the Sorby Medal of that Society in 1963. He was awarded the Bolitho Medal of the Royal Geological Society of Cornwall in 1973.

In 1973, he gave the presidential address to the British Association meeting in Canterbury. Dunham also received honorary doctorates from more than twelve universities, both at home and abroad. He was awarded the Wollaston Medal of the Geological Society of London in 1976.

In July 1990, the British Geological Survey's Keyworth, Nottinghamshire, site was named the Kingsley Dunham Centre in his honour. BGS now refers to its head office there as the Environmental Science Centre. The relocation and consolidation of the BGS functions at the Keyworth site began during Dunham's time as director. The first staff moved to Keyworth in October 1976, and the Survey’s headquarters formally moved there in 1985.

== Later life ==
During his retirement, Dunham continued his research from Durham. He co-authored The Geology of the Northern Pennine Orefield, Volume 2, with A. A. Wilson in 1985, and produced a substantially revised second edition of Volume 1 in 1990.

In his later years his eyesight failed until he became totally blind, but he still attended the weekly meetings in Durham with the help of his friend and colleague Dr. Tony Johnson.

His only son, Ansel Charles Dunham, died in 1998. He was a professor of geology at the University of Hull and the University of Leicester.

Dunham died in Durham on 5 April 2001, aged 91.
