= Bernard Smith (geologist) =

British geologist (1881–1936)

Bernard Smith FRS
- Born: 13 February 1881; Grantham
- Died: 19 August 1936 (aged 55); Hove
- Education: University of Cambridge (B.A.); University of Cambridge (DSc)
- Awards: Fellow of the Royal Society
- Scientific career
- Workplaces: Geological Survey of Great Britain

Bernard Smith FRS (13 February 1881 – 19 August 1936) was a geologist, who worked for the Geological Survey of Great Britain from 1906 to 1936. In 1935, he was appointed director, but died in post less than a year later.

== Early life and education ==
Smith was born in Grantham, Lincolnshire, the fourth son of Alfred Smith, a bootmaker, and Henrietta Mary (née Bussey). He went to school at the King's School in Grantham, and in 1900 went to Sidney Sussex College, Cambridge on a school scholarship. His uncle, the mathematician Charles Smith, was Master of the college at that time. Smith studied Natural Sciences, was awarded a BA in 1903, and completed Part II Geology in 1904, coming top of the year. In 1904, Smith was appointed University Demonstrator in Geology in Cambridge, and in this role continued to carry out fieldwork and write papers. In 1927, Smith was awarded the DSc from the University of Cambridge, based on his published works.

== Career ==
In July 1906, Smith joined the Geological Survey of Great Britain and started work with the Midland Unit, mapping the geology of central England. In 1910, the unit moved to Denbighshire in Wales. After the outbreak of war, Smith and colleagues moved to assess the raw materials that would be needed for the munitions industry: anhydrite, dolomite, silica, ganisters and fireclays. He made new discoveries around the haematite ores of Cumbria, Lancashire and the Lake District. In 1919, Smith returned to Wales, and in 1920 was promoted to take charge of the new Cumberland Coalfield District Unit. This unit, based in Whitehaven was staffed by field geologists including Frederick Murray Trotter, E.E.L. Dixon, Sydney Ewart Hollingworth and Tom Eastwood. In 1928, Smith moved to Brighton, working out of the London office of the survey. In 1931, Smith was promoted to assistant director, working under John Flett. In response to an ongoing drought, Smith turned his attention to underground water supplies across Great Britain. In September 1935, Smith was appointed director of the survey, following Flett's retirement. He fell ill after just eight months in post, and died in August 1936.

== Publications and service ==
Smith published numerous maps, reports and papers during his time with the survey. In 1910, he published a text book Physical geography for schools, published by A & C Black, with second and third editions published in 1916 and 1931.

Smith was examiner for the Natural Sciences Tripos in Cambridge in 1923–24 and 1932–33. He served on the council of the Geological Society of London from 1930 to 1934; and on the council of the Royal Society from 1935 to 1936.

== Awards ==
Smith was awarded the Bigsby Medal of the Geological Society of London in 1927.

Smith was elected to FRS in 1933, with the citation noting his contributions to the 'stratigraphical geology of North Wales, the Lake District and Nottinghamshire ... to the physical history of certain rivers and the tectonics of North Wales'. He was nominated by John Edward Marr, John Smith Flett, Alfred Harker and William Johnson Sollas, among others.

== Family ==
Smith married May Ferguson on 27 July 1912; they had one son, Geoffrey Ferguson Smith.
