= Peter Styles =

Peter Styles may refer to:

- Peter Styles (politician) (born 1953), Australian politician
- Peter Styles (geologist) (born c. 1950), British geologist
