= William Augustus Edmond Ussher =

William Augustus Edmond Ussher (8 July 1849 – 19 March 1920) was a British geologist.

Ussher, born in County Galway, was the youngest of six children in an Irish Protestant family that could trace its ancestry back to Archbishop James Ussher. In April 1868 William Ussher joined the Geological Survey after passing a civil service examination. He retired from the Survey in 1909 after making major contributions to establishing the stratigraphic succession in the Devonian, Carboniferous, and Permian-Triassic rocks in southwestern England, especially Cornwall, Devon, and West Somerset. He contributed articles to the Geological Magazine, the Quarterly Journal of the Geological Society of London, and the Proceedings of the Somersetshire Archaeological and Natural History Society, and several other learned journals. He was awarded the Bolitho Medal of the Royal Geological Society of Cornwall in 1903, and the Murchison Medal of the Geological Society of London in 1914.

== Legacy ==
The Ussher Society, named in his honour, was founded in 1962 to promote the study of geology and geomorphology in southwest England.

The Devonian crinoid Quantoxocrinus ussheri Webby, 1965 was named in his honour.
