= John Ludden =

John Ludden may refer to:

- John D. Ludden (1819–1907), politician from Minnesota Territory
- John Ludden (geologist), British geologist
