= Bally =

Bally may refer to:

== Places ==
- Bally, a historical spelling of Bali
- Bally (from the Irish baile) or townland, a traditional division of land, as well as a common prefix in the names of settlements throughout Ireland
- Bally, Bally-Jagachha, a census town in Howrah district, West Bengal, India
- Bally, Howrah, a city in Howrah district, West Bengal, India
- Bally, Pennsylvania, a borough in the U.S.
- Bally Creek, a stream in Minnesota
- Bally Jagachha, a community development block in Howrah district, West Bengal, India

== People ==
- Bally Bagayoko (born 1973), French politician
- Albert W. Bally (fl. 1988), American geologist
- Charles Bally (1865–1947), Swiss linguist
- Étienne Bally (1923–2018), French sprinter
- Elena Baltacha (born 1983), British tennis player nicknamed Bally
- Maxime Bally (born 1986), Swiss cyclist
- Bally Sagoo (born 1971), British-Indian singer and DJ
- Ralph Sharman (1895-1918), professional baseball player nicknamed Bally

== Companies ==
- Bally (fashion house), Swiss fashion house founded in 1851
- Bally Manufacturing, later known as Bally Entertainment, a defunct pinball manufacturer and casino company
- Bally Midway, a defunct video game publisher once owned by Bally Manufacturing
- Bally Total Fitness, a defunct American fitness club chain once owned by Bally Manufacturing
- Bally Technologies, a gaming company, successor of Bally Manufacturing
- Bally's Corporation, a casino company and current owner of the casino brand
  - For hotels and casinos named "Bally's", see Bally's Corporation#Properties
- Bally's Las Vegas, now Horseshoe Las Vegas, a casino hotel owned by Caesars Entertainment
- Bally Sports, a group of regional sports networks, since renamed FanDuel Sports Networks

== Other uses ==
- Bally Assembly constituency, electoral constituency in Howrah district, India
- Bally, a British minced oath meaning "bloody"

== See also ==
- Baly (disambiguation)
