= John Ludden (geologist) =

British geologist

John Ludden CBE FRSE
- Education: University of Lancaster (BSc); University of Manchester (PhD)
- Scientific career
- Workplaces: University of Montreal; CNRS; British Geological Survey; Heriot-Watt University
- Thesis: The petrology of Piton de la Fournaise Volcano, Reunion Island, western Indian Ocean (1976)
- Doctoral advisor: W.J. Wadsworth and B.F.G. Upton

John Nicholas Ludden CBE FRSE is a British geologist, with expertise in igneous petrology and geochemistry. He was the 19th director of the British Geological Survey from 2006 to 2019, and has been president of the European Geosciences Union and the International Union of Geological Sciences.

== Education ==
Ludden was educated at the Skinners' School in Royal Tunbridge Wells. From 1970 to 1973 he studied for a BSc in Environmental Sciences at the University of Lancaster, before undertaking a PhD in igneous petrology at the University of Manchester. He completed his doctoral thesis on the petrology of Piton de la Fournaise volcano, Reunion Island, under the supervision of W.J. Wadsworth and Brian Upton.

== Career ==
After completing his PhD, Ludden went to Woods Hole Oceanographic Institution in the US as a post-doctoral research fellow. In 1978, he was appointed to a faculty position as associate professor at the Université de Montréal in Canada. In 1984, Ludden was promoted to professor of geochemistry, and was research leader for a part of the Canadian Lithoprobe project, with a focus on the precambrian geology of the Abitibi greenstone belt.

In 1994, Ludden moved to France, as director of the CNRS centre for petrography and geochemistry (CRPG), and director of a research group in Nancy, France. He also taught at ENSG-Nancy. From 2002 to 2006 he was associate director for Earth Sciences for CNRS.

In 2006, Ludden was appointed Director of the British Geological Survey, succeeding David Falvey. He stepped down from this role in 2019, and took up the post of Bicentennial Research Professor at Heriot-Watt University, Edinburgh, until 2022.

Over the course of his research career, Ludden has published research papers on topics ranging from the evolution of the volcanoes of Reunion island to the geology of the precambrian Canadian shield and the weathering of ocean floor basalts. In 1988, Ludden was co-chief scientist on Leg 123 of the Ocean Drilling Program, to the Argo abyssal plain of the Indian Ocean.

== Professional contributions ==
Ludden has held a number of senior positions in international geoscience associations, including:

- Vice-president of the International Association of GeoChemistry, 2000 to 2004.
- President of the International Association of Geochemistry, 2004 to 2008.
- President of the European Geosciences Union from April 2005 to April 2007.
- Vice-president of the European Geosciences Union from April 2007 to April 2008.
- President of the International Union of Geological Sciences, 2020 to present

In addition, Ludden has also joined the board of the Krafla magma testbed project.

== Awards ==
- 2006 – Elected to membership of the Academia Europaea.
- 2016 – Appointed a Commander of the Order of the British Empire (CBE) for services to geoscience in the Birthday Honours list.
- 2021 – Elected Fellow of the Royal Society of Edinburgh (FRSE).

Ludden is also a Foreign member of the Russian Academy of Sciences
