= Philip Lake =

British geologist (1865–1949)

Philip Lake FGS (9 April 1865, Morpeth, Northumberland – 12 June 1949, Cambridge, England) was a British geologist and palaeontologist.

== Education ==
After graduating from Morpeth Grammar School (where his father was the headmaster), Philip Lake studied from 1881 to 1884 at the Durham College of Science, where he learned geology from G. A. L. Lebour. In 1884 Lake matriculated at St John's College, Cambridge. There he graduated with a B.A. in 1887.

== Career ==
Soon after receiving his B.A, he joined the Geological Survey of India. In 1890 his monograph The Geology of South Malabar, Between the Beypore and Ponnani River was published and he resigned from the Geology Survey due to ill health. From 1890 to 1892 he studied at the University of Cambridge, where he graduated with an M.A. For a number of years Lake held no academic appointment and earned money from private tutoring, examining, and lecturing. In 1903 he became headmaster at the Colchester Technical School. In the department of regional and physical geography of the University of Cambridge, Lake was from 1908 to 1919 and reader and head of the department from 1919 to 1927, when he retired.

From 1893 to 1912, Lake did research on the Lower Palaeozoic formations of five districts in North Wales. He did research on the river system of Wales, on hill slopes, on mountain and island arcs, and on Wegener's theory of continental drift. Lake published papers on the genus Acidaspis (1896), as well as on trilobites from Bolivia (1906) and from the Bokkeveld Beds of South Africa (1904). His main palaeontological work was a monograph of British Cambrian trilobites published in several parts by the Palaeontographical Society from 1906 to 1946. In connexion with this important monograph, Lake developed a method of photography which eliminated much of the distortion of the trilobite fossils and showed their original form.

Emanuel Kayser's 1891 Lehrbuch der geologischen Formationskunde was translated and edited by Philip Lake and published in 1893 under the title Text-book of Comparative Geology. With Robert Heron Rastall (1871–1950), Lake wrote a Text-book of Geology (1910), of which five editions were published by 1941. Lake's 1915 book Physical Geography was an immediate success and remained a standard work for several decades. He also contributed articles on regional geology to the 1911 Encyclopedia Britannica. Lake served from 1904 to 1907 and from 1927 to 1928 on the Council of the Geological Society of London and was awarded in 1912 the society's Lyell Medal.

== Selected publications ==
=== Articles ===
- Lake, Philip (1885). "VII.—Woodwardian Museum Notes". Geological Magazine. 2 (7): 318–320. Bibcode:1885GeoM....2..318L. doi:10.1017/S0016756800152331.
- Lake, Philip (1893). "The Origin of Gold". Science. 22 (552): 121–122. doi:10.1126/science.ns-22.552.121.a. PMID 17746213.
- Lake, Philip (1894). "Indian Geology". Science Progress. 2: 127–139.
- Lake, Philip (1895). "The Denbighshire Series of South Denbighshire". Quarterly Journal of the Geological Society of London. 51 (1–4): 9–23. doi:10.1144/gsl.jgs.1895.051.01-04.03.
- Lake, Philip (1896). "The Geology of Egypt". Science Progress. 4: 395–412.
- Lake, Philip (1896). "The British Silurian Species of Acidaspis". Quarterly Journal of the Geological Society of London. 52 (1–4): 235–245. doi:10.1144/gsl.jgs.1896.052.01-04.13.
- Lake, Philip (1906). "A Monograph of the British Cambrian Trilobites. Part I. Pages 1–28; Plates I, II". Monographs of the Palaeontographical Society. 60 (287): 1–28. Bibcode:1906MPalS..60....1L. doi:10.1080/02693445.1906.12035525.
- Lake, Philip (1906). "Trilobites from Bolivia, collected by Dr. J. W. Evans in 1901–1902". Quarterly Journal of the Geological Society of London. 62 (1–4): 425–430. doi:10.1144/gsl.jgs.1906.062.01-04.18.
- Lake, Philip (1907). "A Monograph of the British Cambrian Trilobites. Part II. Pages 29–48; Plates III, IV". Monographs of the Palaeontographical Society. 61 (296): 29–48. Bibcode:1907MPalS..61...29L. doi:10.1080/02693445.1907.12035534.
- Groom, Theodore; Lake, Philip (1908). "The Bala and Llandovery Rocks of Glyn Ceiriog North Wales". Quarterly Journal of the Geological Society of London. 64 (1–4): 546–595. doi:10.1144/GSL.JGS.1908.064.01-04.31. (See Bala Series and Llandovery Epoch.)
- Lake, Philip (1913). "A Monograph of the British Cambrian Trilobites. Part IV. Pages 65–88; Plates VII–X". Monographs of the Palaeontographical Society. 66 (324): 65–88. Bibcode:1913MPalS..66...65L. doi:10.1080/02693445.1913.12035562. online text at archive.org
- Lake, Philip (1919). "A Monograph of the British Cambrian Trilobites. Part V. Pages 89–120; Plates XI–XIV". Monographs of the Palaeontographical Society. 71 (343): 89–120. Bibcode:1919MPalS..71...89L. doi:10.1080/02693445.1919.12035578.
- Gadow, Hans (1930). Jorullo: The History of the Volcano of Jorullo and the Reclamation of the Devastated District by Animals and Plants.
- Lake, Philip (1931). "Island Arcs and Mountain Building". The Geographical Journal. 78 (2): 149–157. Bibcode:1931GeogJ..78..149L. doi:10.2307/1784446. JSTOR 1784446.
- Lake, Philip (1932). "A Monograph of the British Cambrian Trilobites. Part VII. Pages 149–172: Plates XIX-XXII". Monographs of the Palaeontographical Society. 84 (385): 149–172. Bibcode:1932MPalS..84..149L. doi:10.1080/02693445.1932.12035620.
- Lake, Philip (1935). "A Monograph of the British Cambrian Trilobites. Part IX. Pages 197–224; Plates XXVI–XXXI". Monographs of the Palaeontographical Society. 88 (399): 197–224. Bibcode:1935MPalS..88..197L. doi:10.1080/02693445.1935.12035634.
- Lake, Philip (1940). "Monograph of the British Cambrian Trilobites. Part XII. Pages 273–306; Plates XL–XLIII". Monographs of the Palaeontographical Society. 94 (421): 273–306. Bibcode:1940MPalS..94..273L. doi:10.1080/02693445.1940.12035665.
- Lake, Philip (1942). "Monograph of the British Cambrian Trilobites. Part XIII. PAGES 307–332; Plates XLIV–XLVI". Monographs of the Palaeontographical Society. 96 (427): 307–332. Bibcode:1942MPalS..96..307L. doi:10.1080/02693445.1942.12035671.

=== Books ===
- Kayser, Emanuel (1893). Text Book of Comparative Geology. Translated by Philip Lake (1st ed.). London: Swan, Sonnenschein & Co; xii+426 pages
  - Kayser, Emanuel (1895). 1895 2nd edition.
- Lake, Philip; Rastall, Robert Heron (1910). A Textbook of Geology. Arnold's Geological Series (1st ed.). London: Edward Arnold. (2nd edition, 1912)
  - Lake, Philip; Rastall, Robert Heron (1922). 1922 reprint of 1920 3rd edition. (4th edition 1927)
  - 1958 reprint of 1941 5th edition.
- Lake, Philip (1922). Physical Geography. Cambridge University Press; 1922 reprint of 1915 1st edition
  - 2nd ed., revised and enlarged by J. A. Steers, G. Manley, and W. V. Lewis, under the editorship of J. A. Steers. 1949. LCCN 50005555.
  - 1952 3rd edition. LCCN 52014547.
  - 1958 4th edition. LCCN 59016103.
