= John Ayrton Paris =

British physician (1785–1856)

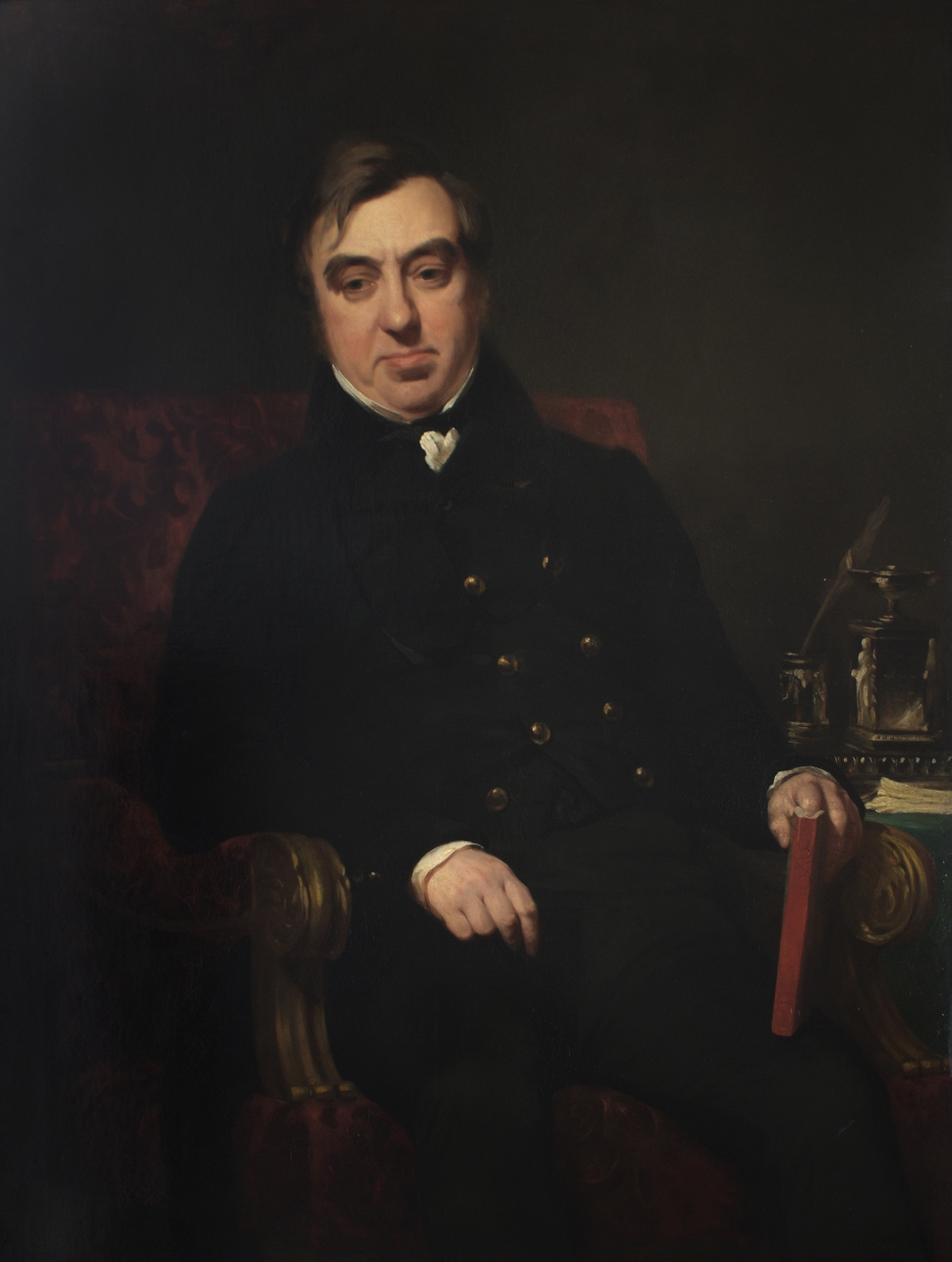
John Ayrton Paris c. 1838

John Ayrton Paris, FRS (7 August 1785 – 24 December 1856) was a British physician. He is a possible inventor of the thaumatrope, which he published with W. Phillips in April 1825.

== Life ==
Paris made one of the earliest observations of occupational causes of cancer when, in 1822, he recognised that exposure to arsenic fumes might be contributing to the unusually high rate of scrotal skin cancer among men working in copper-smelting in Cornwall and Wales. He also wrote about accidents caused by explosives in mines and gave lectures on chemistry to the Royal Geological Society of Cornwall, serving as its first secretary. In 1844, he was elected president of the Royal College of Physicians, an office he held until his death. He was elected a Fellow of the Royal Society in June 1821. Paris advocated for the use of scientifically assessed herbal preparations in medical treatment.

The exact date and location of Paris's birth are uncertain, with some sources listing 7 August 1785, and others noting either Cambridge or Edinburgh as his birthplace, a city with which he had connections.

== Works ==
- Pharmacologia : corrected and extended, in Accordance with the London Pharmacopoeia of 1824, and with the generally advanced State of chemical Science. – New York : Duyckinck, 3rd American from the 6th London Ed. 1825 Digital edition by the University and State Library Düsseldorf
- Appendix to the 8th Edition of the Pharmacologia : with some Remarks on various Criticisms upon the London Pharmacopoeia of 1836. – London : Highley, 1838. Digital edition by the University and State Library Düsseldorf

He wrote a number of substantial medical books, including Medical Jurisprudence (co-authored; 1823), a Pharmacologia which first appeared in 1820 and went through numerous editions, Elements of Medical Chemistry (1825) and a Treatise on Diet (1826). He also produced memoirs of other physicians for the Royal College, and Davy's first biography, The Life of Sir Humphry Davy (1831).

His Philosophy in Sport made Science in Earnest: Being an Attempt to Implant in the Young Mind the First Principles of Natural Philosophy by the Aid of the Popular Toys and Sports of Youth described many simple but amusing experiments and devices that demonstrate scientific principles. It was first published anonymously in 1827, and not credited to him until the first posthumous edition.

- A Guide to the Mount's Bay and the Land's End: comprehending the topography, botany, agriculture, fisheries, antiquities, mining, mineralogy, and geology of western Cornwall. (1828) London: Thomas and George Underwood.
