= Peter Fookes =

British engineering geologist

- Born: Peter George Fookes; 31 May 1933; Ilford, England
- Died: 7 September 2020; Wickham, Hampshire
- Known for: Engineering geology
- Awards: William Smith Medal of Geological Society of London, Glossop Medal
- Scientific career
- Institutions: Royal School of Mines
- Doctoral advisor: Alec Skempton

Peter George Fookes (31 May 1933 – 7 September 2020) was a British engineering geologist. He went to school at Reigate Grammar School (1944-1949) before going to university at Queen Mary College, University of London for his BSc and Imperial College for his PhD. He has been described as the "father of engineering geomorphology".He was awarded the William Smith Medal by the Geological Society of London in 1985, and the Glossop Medal and the first Glossop Lecture in 1997, titled Geology for Engineers: the Geological Model, Prediction and Performance.

In 2025 the Geological Society published The Peter Fookes Engineering Geological Legacy in Geomodels, Geomaterials and Geomorphology in his honour. The book was co-authored/edited by J.S. Griffiths, D.P. Giles, J.A. Davis and J.J. Dunlop, ISBN 978-1-78620-690-9.
