= Edward Budge =

British geologist and theologian

Edward Budge (1800–1865) was an English theologian, geologist, and general writer.

== Life ==
He was the son of John Budge, and was a native of Devon. He was educated at Saffron Walden, Essex, and was admitted at Christ's College, Cambridge, on 14 March 1820, when twenty years old. In 1824 he took the degree of B.A., and in the same year was ordained deacon by the bishop of Exeter. After holding several curacies in the west of England, he was instituted in 1839 to the small living of Manaccan, Cornwall, and remained there until 1846, when he was appointed by the bishop of Exeter to the more valuable rectory of Bratton Clovelly, North Devon. He died at his rectory on 3 Aug. 1865, aged 65. At his death his family was left without any provision for their support. In the hope of raising some money for their necessities, the Rev. R. B. Kinsman, the vicar of Tintagel, published, in 1866, a collection of Posthumous Gleanings from Budge's study and from the essays which he had contributed to the Saturday Review.

Budge was a learned theologian and a skilled geologist. For Edward Pusey's Library of the Fathers he translated the Homilies of St. John Chrysostom on the Statues, and his scientific knowledge was shown in the numerous articles which he supplied to the Royal Geological Society of Cornwall, and to the Royal Institution of Cornwall, on the geology of the Lizard district. To the Rev. H. A. Simcoe's periodical of Light from the West he furnished a series of articles setting forth the reflections of the Christian Naturalist, which was published in 1838 in a volume bearing that title. A compilation from his pen The Mirror of History was issued in 1851. He published many visitation and other sermons.
