= Karen Hanghøj =

Danish geologist (born 1966)

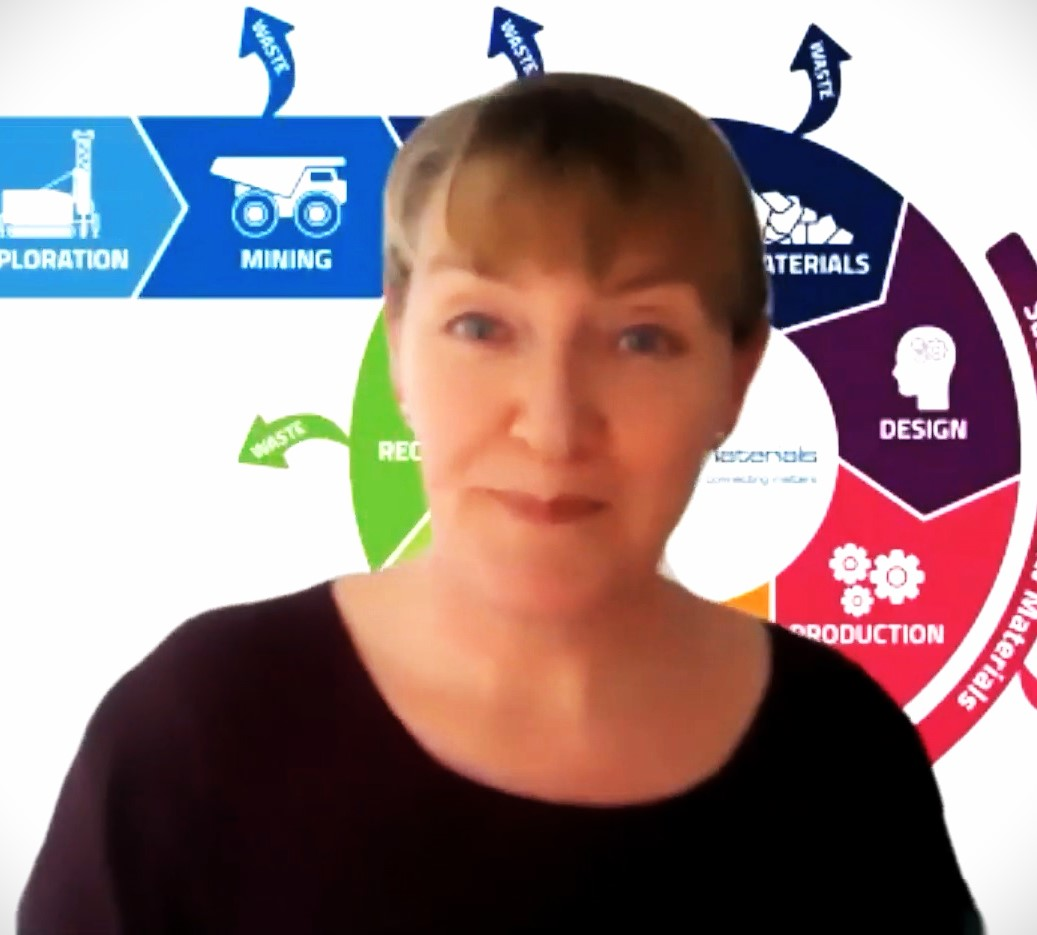
- Hanghøj speaks to the European Geosciences Union in 2020
- Born: 1966 (age 59–60); Lemvig, Denmark
- Education: University of Copenhagen (MSc); University of Copenhagen (PhD)
- Awards: William Smith Medal (2023)
- Scientific career
- Workplaces: Geological Survey of Denmark and Greenland; EIT RawMaterials; British Geological Survey (Director, 2019)
- Theses: Petrographic description of the Au–PGE mineralization in the Skaergaard intrusion (MSc, 1993); Geochemistry of the East Greenland Tertiary dyke swarm; temporal and spatial variations. (PhD, 1998))

Karen Hanghøj (born 1966) is a Danish geologist with expertise in the sustainable management of natural mineral resources. In 2019 she was appointed director of the British Geological Survey. She was the first woman to take on this role since the survey was founded in 1835.

== Education ==
Hanghøj went to school in Denmark, and studied geology at the University of Copenhagen where she obtained an MSc, and then a PhD. Her master's work involved fieldwork in east Greenland, where she studied mineralisation associated with the igneous rocks that were emplaced during the opening of the north Atlantic Ocean. Her PhD thesis was a study of the geochemistry and age of the Paleogene dyke swarm in east Greenland. While working in Greenland, Hanghøj also gained experience with a mining exploration company, drilling for gold and platinum in the area.

== Career ==
After completing her PhD, Hanghøj worked both as a research geologist in academia at Woods Hole Oceanographic Institution and at Lamont Doherty Earth Observatory, and in various exploration geology roles as consultant. She was head of the department of economic geology and petrology at the Geological Survey of Denmark and Greenland (GEUS) from 2011 to 2015. Later, she was CEO and managing director of EIT RawMaterials, a European Institute of Innovation and Technology knowledge and innovation community based in Berlin set up in 2014 to 'develop raw materials into a major strength for Europe'.

In 2019, Hanghøj was appointed Director of the British Geological Survey, the world's oldest national geological survey. She was the first woman appointed to this role. In 2022, she established the UK Critical Minerals Centre in partnership with the Department for Business, Energy and Industrial Strategy, to advise on the resilience of the critical mineral supply chain for the economy and for green technologies.

== Professional contributions ==
Hanghøj has published research papers on the geology of East Greenland, the Skaergaard intrusion and the geochemistry of the Earth's crust. In 2023, Hanghøj co-edited a special publication of the Geological Society, The Green Stone Age: Exploration and Exploitation of Minerals for Green Technologies.

She is currently chair of the United Nations Economic Commission for Europe (UNECE) expert group on resource management and bureau, which has the mission to develop global systems for sustainable management of natural resources.

== Awards ==
In 2020, Hanghøj was awarded an honorary doctorate from Uppsala University, in recognition of 'her outstanding contribution to geological research ... especially in the field of raw materials'.

In 2023, Hanghøj was awarded the William Smith Medal of the Geological Society of London, in recognition of her contributions to 'applied and economic aspects of geology', and in particular for her work on raw materials and the sustainable green energy transition and as an 'ambassador for the geosciences ... in the UK and across the world'.
