= William Topley (geologist) =

William Topley FRS (13 March 1841 – 30 September 1894) was a British geologist. He was elected a Fellow of the Royal Society in 1888.

After early education in private schools, Topley studied at the Royal School of Mines from 1858 to 1862. After graduation, he joined the Geological Survey in England under the direction of Dr. Le Neve Foster. Foster and Topley worked in the Wealden area and afterwards in Derbyshire. In 1865 the two of them communicated to the Geological Society of London their famous paper On the superficial deposits of the Valley of the Medway, with remarks on the Denudation of the Weald. In this now-classic paper there is a presentation of evidence on how rain and rivers cause erosion and sedimentary deposits. In 1868 Topley was promoted to geologist and began work with Professor G. A. Lebour on the Whin Sill escarpment, producing another important paper. In 1880 Topley was recalled from Northumberland to superintend the survey office in London for the preparation of geological maps and memoirs. Besides serving on the councils and committees of several learned societies, he was president of the Geologists' Association from 1885–1887 and editor of The Geological Record from 1887 to 1889.
