= William Smith Medal =

The William Smith Medal is a medal of the Geological Society of London, awarded for outstanding research in applied or economic geology. It was first awarded in 1977. It is named after William Smith.

== Smith Medalists ==
Source: Geological Society

=== Twentieth century ===
- 1977 Robert Ferguson Legget
- 1978 Marion King Hubbert
- 1979 William Harry Mayne
- 1980 George Armstrong
- 1981 John Stewart Webb
- 1982 Albert W. Bally
- 1983 Roy Woodall
- 1984 Bernard Pierre Tissot
- 1985 Peter George Fookes
- 1986 Peter Robbins Vail
- 1987 Robert Stanton
- 1988 Peter Ziegler
- 1989 Richard Allen Downing
- 1990 Desmond A Pretorius
- 1991 William Robert Dearman
- 1992 Daniel Francis Merriam
- 1993 Evert Hoek
- 1994 Ziad Rafiq Beydoun
- 1995 John Knill
- 1996 Richard Henry Sillitoe
- 1997 John Anthony Cherry
- 1998 Stephen Larter
- 1999 John William Lloyd
- 2000 Denys Brunsden

=== Twenty-first century ===
- 2001 Kenneth William Glennie
- 2002 Nicholas Ambraseys
- 2003 Richard Hardman
- 2004 Jeffrey Hedenquist
- 2005 Robert Knipe
- 2006 Stephen Foster
- 2007 Michael Worthington
- 2008 Martin Sinha
- 2009 Michael Russell
- 2010 Henry Posamentier
- 2011 Robert Stuart Haszeldine
- 2012 Willy Aspinall
- 2013 Dr Martin P A Jackson
- 2014 Peter Styles
- 2015 Anthony Doré
- 2016 Michael de Freitas
- 2017 John Walsh
- 2018 Peter Dolan
- 2019 Frances Wall
- 2020 Alastair Ruffell
- 2021 Philip Christie
- 2022 Rod Graham
- 2023 Karen Hanghøj
- 2024 Jacqueline Skipper
- 2025 David Selby

== See also ==
- List of economics awards
- List of geology awards
- Prizes named after people
