= Clement le Neve Foster =

English geologist and mineralogist

Sir Clement le Neve Foster FRS
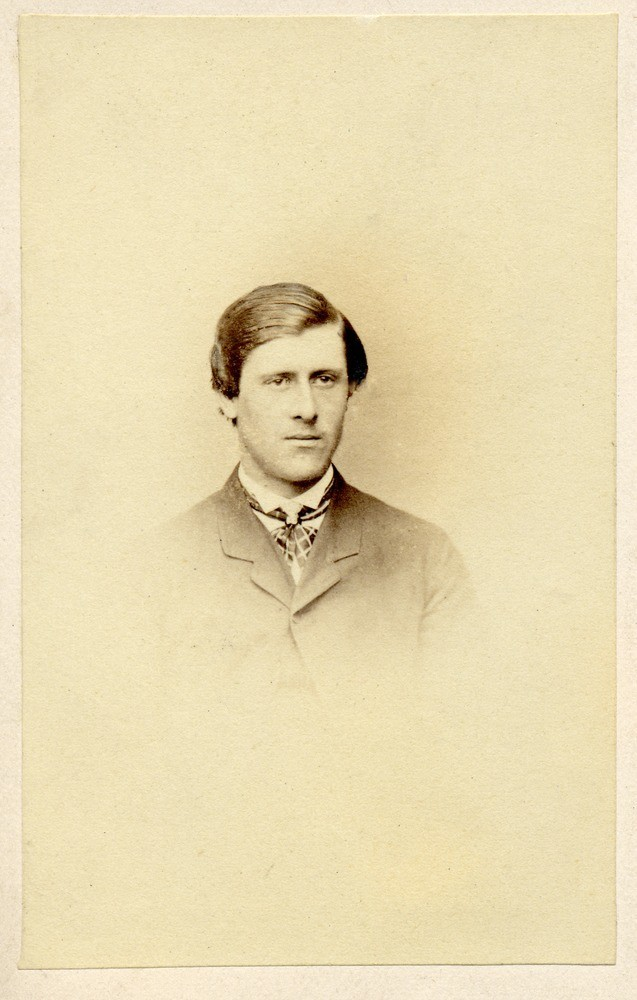
- Born: 23 March 1841; Camberwell, London, England
- Died: 19 April 1904 (aged 63); London, England
- Spouse: Sophia Chevallier Tompson
- Children: 3
- Parents: Peter le Never Foster (father); Georgiana Chevallier (mother)

Sir Clement le Neve Foster FRS (23 March 1841 – 19 April 1904) was an English geologist and mineralogist.

== Life and work ==
Le Neve Foster was born in Camberwell, the second son of Peter le Neve Foster (for many years secretary of the Society of Arts) and Georgiana Chevallier. After receiving his early education at Boulogne and Amiens, he studied successively at the Royal School of Mines in London and at the mining college of Freiberg in Saxony. In 1860 he joined the Geological Survey in England, working in the Wealden area and afterwards in Derbyshire. Conjointly with William Topley (1841–1894) he communicated to the Geological Society of London in 1865 the now classic paper On the superficial deposits of the Valley of the Medway, with remarks on the Denudation of the Weald. In this paper the sculpturing of the Wealden area by rain and rivers was ably advocated. Retiring from the Geological Survey in 1865, Foster devoted his attention to mineralogy and mining in Cornwall, Egypt and Venezuela, becoming a lecturer for the Miners Association and secretary of the Royal Cornwall Polytechnic Society.

In 1872, he was appointed an inspector of mines under the home office for the southwest of England, and in 1880 he was transferred, at his own request, to the N. Wales district. In 1890, upon the death of Sir Warington Smyth, he was appointed professor of mining at the Royal College of Science and he held this post until the close of his life. His later work is embodied largely in the reports of mines and quarries issued annually by the home office. He was distinguished for his extensive scientific and practical knowledge of metalliferous mining and stone quarrying. He was elected a Fellow of the Royal Society in 1892 and was knighted in 1903. In 1900 he was awarded the Bolitho Medal of the Royal Geological Society of Cornwall and he was President 1901-02. While investigating the cause of a mining disaster at the Snaefell Mine, Isle of Man in 1897, his constitution suffered much injury from carbon monoxide gas, and he never fully recovered from the effects. He died in London, on 19 April 1904.

He married Sophia Chevallier Tompson in 1872. They had three children: a son, Vivian, a schoolmaster at Eton College, and two daughters, Olga and Helen, both of whom married clergymen.

He published Ore and Stone Mining, 1894 (ed. 5, 1904); and The Elements of Mining and Quarrying, 1903.
