= Robert Legget =

Canadian civil engineer, historian and non-fiction writer

Robert Ferguson Legget
- Born: September 29, 1904; Liverpool, England
- Died: April 17, 1994 (aged 89); Ottawa, Ontario
- Education: University of Liverpool
- Occupation: civil engineer
- Awards: Order of Canada

Robert Ferguson Legget CC FRSC FRSE (September 29, 1904 – April 17, 1994) was a civil engineer, historian and non-fiction writer. He is internationally known for his contributions to engineering, geology and building research and standardization. He is credited with the establishment of co-operation amongst Canadian geotechnical engineers, geologists and pedologists.

== Life ==
Legget was born in Liverpool, England, to Donald Thompson Legget and his wife Mary, both of whom were of Scottish descent. He was educated at the Merchant Taylors' Boys' School, Crosby. He studied Civil Engineering and obtained a BEng (Hons) in 1925, and MEng 1927, from the University of Liverpool. He was initially employed as an engineer on the Lochaber Water Power Scheme in Scotland. He then emigrated to Canada in 1929, working for the Power Corporation of Canada.

In 1936, he began teaching at Queen's University and the University of Toronto. He left teaching in 1947 to establish and serve as director of the National Research Council of Canada's new Division of Building Research. He held this position until he retired in 1969. Part of his legacy there was to establish a National Building Code that was respected throughout all of Canada, as opposed to the multitude of inconsistent local codes that were prevalent in 1947.

Around 1945, after World War II, Legget shaped the Environmental Conservation movement in Ontario by spearheading the Guelph Conference, the Ganaraska Study and the Conservation Authorities Act of Ontario (1946). He also was a founder, in 1962, of the Canadian Permafrost Conferences.

He was the founding President of the Canadian Academy of Engineering.

Between 1959 and 1960, Legget was the chairman of the Engineering Geology Division of the Geological Society of America (GSA). He served as GSA president in 1966.

In 1971 he received an honorary doctorate (DEng) from the University of Liverpool. In 1977 he received the Sir John Kennedy Medal.

After he retired, Dr. Legget wrote many books on the history of transportation in Canada including Ottawa Waterway: Gateway to A Continent, Rideau Waterway, Canals of Canada, The Seaway, and others, and he was a contributor to the Dictionary of Canadian Biography.

Legget died in Ottawa at the age of 89. His wife, Mary Free, had died in 1984. They had one son.

== Philanthropy ==
The Legget Endowment Fund is used by the Conservation Foundation on an annual basis for otherwise-unfunded current needs in the Rideau Valley.

== Publications ==
- Editor of Soils in Canada
- General editor of the Canadian Building Series, published by University of Toronto Press
- "The Region and the City." in Planning Canadian Towns and Cities (University of Toronto, Extension Department, 1944, vol. 2)
- Rideau Waterway (1955), (revised 1972) – history of the Rideau Canal
- Ottawa Waterway, Gateway to a Continent (1975)
- Canals of Canada (1975)
- Glacial Till (1976)
- Handbook of Geology in Civil Engineering (1983) with P.F. Karrow
- Railways of Canada(1973)

== Honours, awards and legacy ==
- Recognized by 13 honorary degrees including;
  - 1963, an honorary Doctorate of Science by the University of Waterloo
  - 1969, an honorary Doctorate of Science by the University of Western Ontario
  - 1971, an honorary Doctorate of Engineering by the University of Liverpool
  - 1972, an honorary Doctorate of Science by Concordia University
- Honours
  - made an honorary member of the American Underground Construction Association
  - received the Royal Bank Award
  - made an Honorary Life Member of the Rideau Valley Conservation Authority
  - the Canadian Geotechnical Society awards the R.F. Legget Medal as its highest honour
  - 1967, invested as an Officer of the Order of Canada
  - 1988, elected to the National Academy of Engineering
  - 1989, promoted to Companion of the Order of Canada
- Awards
  - 1972, awarded the Logan Medal by the Geological Association of Canada
  - 1974, awarded the Claire P. Holdredge Award by Association of Environmental and Engineering Geologists
  - 1977, awarded the William Smith Medal by the Geological Society of London
- Archives
