= Steve Larter =

Canadian geochemist

Emeritus Steve Larter
- Education: University of Cambridge; Newcastle University
- Awards: William Smith Medal (1998); Friendship Medal (2000); CSPG Medal of Merit (2012, 2014); Treibs Medal (2014)
- Scientific career
- Fields: Geochemistry
- Workplaces: University of Oslo; University of Calgary

Stephen (Steve) R. Larter is a Canadian Emeritus Professor of geochemistry at the University of Calgary. Dr. Larter was appointed as associate vice-president (research – innovation) (AVPR-I), effective Feb. 25, 2019 at the University of Calgary.

Dr. Larter has been a co-founder of numerous technology startup companies, including Gushor Inc. (now part of Schlumberger), and is a chief scientist of the Creative Destruction Lab-Rockies. He currently advises several university-based student, postdoctoral, and faculty startups. He has also worked on transition technologies for zero-emission energy recovery, including direct hydrogen or electricity production from oil and gas fields and for capturing and sequestering carbon dioxide on a large scale.

Dr. Larter has worked in research and development in the oil and gas industry, as well as the universities of Oslo and Newcastle. A recipient of numerous academic and civil awards, Dr. Larter is a fellow of the Royal Society, a fellow of the Royal Society of Canada, and a foreign member of the Norwegian Academy of Sciences and Arts.

== Early life ==
Steve Larter got his BS degree in natural sciences from University of Cambridge in 1974. A year later he got his Master of Science degree in both organic geochemistry and organic petrology from Newcastle University and in 1978 got his PhD in petroleum geochemistry from the same alma mater. From 1979 to 1986 he worked as Senior Geochemist Researcher at the Unocal Corporation and from 1987 to 1989 was a visiting professor of petroleum at the University of Oslo in Norway. From 1989 to 2015 he held a position as J B Simpson professor of geology at the Newcastle University and then became Emeritus Professor in the same field and at the same place. As of 2004 he works as a Canada Research Chair at University of Calgary.

== Research ==
One of Larter's earliest articles dated to 1980 was about melanoidins and how they are similar to kerogens. In 1989 Larter studied calcite and kaolinite which were formed during late Cimmerian erosion. The same year he traveled to Huldra and Veslefrikk fields and compared his findings. By comparing them, he discovered that addition of saline at Huldra field evolved the fluids replacing that way paleometeoric water, which can not be found at Veslefrikk field. In June 1993, Larter have studied petroleum on Ula oil field by collecting quartz, albite, and orthoclase minerals. By collecting and studying them he and his team discovered why Ula's oil field changes so rapidly.

== Awards ==
Larter is a fellow of the Royal Society as well as it branch in Canada.

- William Smith Medal (1998)
- Friendship Medal (2000)
- CSPG Medal of Merit (2012, 2014)
- Treibs Medal (2014)
