= Frances Wall =

British professor of applied mineralogy

Frances Wall Dr
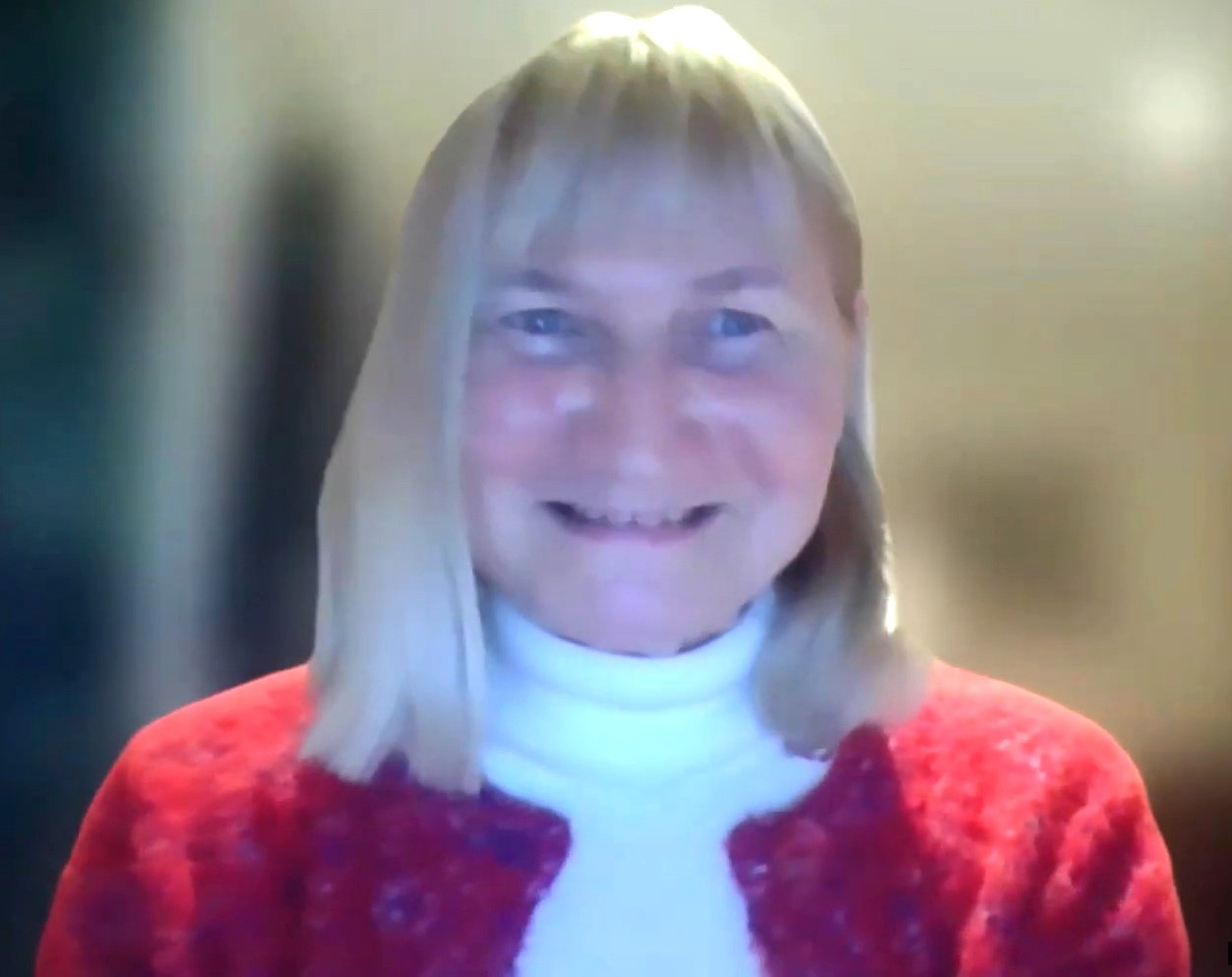
- Wall in 2025
- Education: Queen Mary University of London; University of London
- Awards: William Smith Medal (2019); OBE (2026)
- Scientific career
- Workplaces: University of Exeter; Natural History Museum
- Thesis: Mineral chemistry and petrogenesis of rare earth-rich carbonates with particular reference to the Kangankunde carbonatite, Malawi (2000)

Frances Wall is a British geochemist who is a professor of applied mineralogy at the Camborne School of Mines at the University of Exeter. She is a president of the Royal Geological Society of Cornwall. Wall is an expert in geology and process mineralogy of rare-earth elements.

== Early life and education ==
Wall earned her bachelor's degree at the University of London, where she studied at Queen Mary University of London. Her doctorate explored carbonates rich in rare-earth minerals, focusing on the Kangankunde carbonatite in Malawi. She worked at the Natural History Museum.

== Research and career ==
In 2007, Wall moved to Cornwall and in 2008, she was appointed Head of the Camborne School of Mines, the first woman to hold the position. Wall is an expert in the geology of critical minerals. Critical minerals underpin the global transition to a low carbon economy. Wall has explored geological resources in South West England, including: tin, tungsten, lithium and geothermal energy. These resources are key to electric vehicles, wind turbines and solar panels. She is interested in the creating value at every stage of their lifecycle.

Walls served as president of the Mineralogical Society of Great Britain and Ireland and the Cornish Institute of Engineers. When she was elected president of the Mineralogical Society in 2014, she was the first woman to hold the position.

In 2019, Wall was awarded the William Smith Medal by the Geological Society of London and in 2026 an OBE. In 2023, she was made the president of the Royal Geological Society of Cornwall.

Wall leads the Critical Minerals Challenge Centre at the University of Exeter. The Critical Materials Challenge Centre looks to support innovation in critical minerals and accelerate the UK's transition to net-zero emissions. In 2022, Wall contributed to the UK Critical Minerals Strategy and Vision 2035: Critical Minerals Strategy.

== Selected publications ==
- Kathryn M. Goodenough; Frances Wall; David Merriman (20 April 2017). "The Rare Earth Elements: Demand, Global Resources, and Challenges for Resourcing Future Generations". Natural Resources Research. 27 (2): 201–216. doi:10.1007/s11053-017-9336-5. ISSN 1520-7439. Wikidata Q57923463.
- H.A.L. Elliott; F. Wall; A.R. Chakhmouradian; et al. (February 2018). "Fenites associated with carbonatite complexes: A review". Ore Geology Reviews. 93: 38–59. doi:10.1016/j.oregeorev.2017.12.003. ISSN 0169-1368. Wikidata Q57939901.
- Michael Anenburg; John Mavrogenes; Corinne Frigo; Frances Wall (9 October 2020). "Rare earth element mobility in and around carbonatites controlled by sodium, potassium, and silica". Science Advances. 6 (41). Bibcode:2020SciA....6.6570A. doi:10.1126/sciadv.abb6570. ISSN 2375-2548. PMC 7546697. PMID 33036966. Wikidata Q100511846.
