= Robert Heron Rastall =

British geologist (1871–1950)

Robert Heron Rastall FGS (November 8, 1871, Turnerdale Hall near Whitby, North Yorkshire – February 3, 1950) was a British geologist and academic associated with the University of Cambridge. He was a co-editor-in-chief of Geological Magazine.

== Early life ==
Robert Heron Rastall was the eldest son of the Cambridge alumnus Herbert Augustus Henry Rastall (1847–1910) of the manor Turnerdale Hall near Whitby. After studying agricultural science and taking a diploma from the Royal Agricultural Society of England, Robert H. Rastall held an appointment as a staff member of the Tamworth Agricultural College and Training Farm, which was in operation from 1886 to 1914. In 1899 he matriculated at Christ's College, Cambridge. There he studied geology and graduated with a B.A. with 1903 and an M.A. in 1906.

== Career ==
In London at Messrs. Wren and Gurney's, he was a lecturer in geology from 1903 to 1906 and from 1908 to 1909. From 1906 to 1913 he was a fellow of Christ's College, Cambridge. He was employed from 1910 to 1919 as an additional demonstrator in geology at the University of Cambridge and from 1915 to 1919 also worked in economic geology for the British War Office. At the University of Cambridge he was appointed in 1919 a lecturer in economic geology and was awarded the Sc.D. in 1921. During his teaching career, he served for some years as the president of the University of Cambridge's Catholic Association. From 1926 until his death in 1950 he was a supernumerary fellow of Christ's College, Cambridge.

Rastall was an active member of both the Geological Society of London and the Mineralogical Society of Great Britain and Ireland and served on the councils of both societies. Rastall's research focused on petrology and structural geology. From 1903 to 1914 he did research in the Lake District and in South Africa. During those years he published papers on the Ennerdale granophyre, the metamorphism of the rocks around the Skiddaw granite, and the sedimentary petrology and geological structure of south-eastern England, as well as the structural geology of the rocks near Worcester, South Africa. In 1911 he co-authored, with Philip Lake, the Text-Book of Geology. Rastall was the author of the books Agricultural Geology (1916), The Geology of the Metalliferous Deposits (1923), and Physico-Chemical Geology (1927).

In 1916, Rastall began assisting Henry Woodward in editing the Geological Magazine and became in 1919 the editor-in-chief. In 1934 Oliver Bulman and Rastall became co-editors-in-chief of the Geological Magazine and their editorial partnership continued until Rastall's death in 1950. Rastall served as the geological editor for the 1929 edition of the Encyclopaedia Britannica.

Some time around the beginning of World War II, Rastall retired from the University of Cambridge to live in his old home in the village of Ruswarp near Whitby. In retirement, he did research, in collaboration with John Edwin Hemingway (1906–1997), on Yorkshire's Jurassic rocks.

== Honors ==
In 1926, Rastall was awarded the Bolitho Medal of the Royal Geological Society of Cornwall and in 1946 he was awarded the Lyell Medal of the Geological Society of London.

== Selected publications ==
=== Articles ===
- Rastall, Robert Heron (1905). "The Blea Wyke Beds and the Dogger in North-East Yorkshire". Quarterly Journal of the Geological Society of London. 61 (1–4): 441–460. doi:10.1144/GSL.JGS.1905.061.01-04.24. 1905
- Rastall, Robert Heron (1906). "The Buttermere and Ennerdale Granophyre". Quarterly Journal of the Geological Society of London. 62 (1–4): 253–274. doi:10.1144/GSL.JGS.1906.062.01-04.14.
- Rastall, R. H. (1906). "The Ingletonian Series of West Yorkshire". Proceedings of the Yorkshire Geological Society. 16 (1): 87–100. Bibcode:1906PYGS...16...87R. doi:10.1144/pygs.16.1.87.
- Rastall, Robert Heron; Romanes, James (1909). "On the Boulders of the Cambridge Drift: Their Distribution and Origin". Quarterly Journal of the Geological Society of London. 65 (1–4): 246–264. doi:10.1144/GSL.JGS.1909.065.01-04.19.
- Rastall, R. H. (1910). "The Skiddaw Granite and its Metamorphism". Quarterly Journal of the Geological Society of London. 66 (1–4): 116–141. doi:10.1144/GSL.JGS.1910.066.01-04.08.
- Hatch, F. H.; Rastall, R. H. (1910). "Dedolomitization in the Marble of Port Shepstone (Natal)". Quarterly Journal of the Geological Society of London. 66 (1–4): 507–522. doi:10.1144/GSL.JGS.1910.066.01-04.27.
- Rastall, R. H.; Wilcockson, W. H. (1915). "The Accessory Minerals of the Granitic Rocks of the English Lake District". Quarterly Journal of the Geological Society of London. 71 (1–4): 592–622. doi:10.1144/GSL.JGS.1915.071.01-04.22.
- Rastall, R. H. (1919). "III.—The Mineral Composition of the Lower Greensand Strata of Eastern England". Geological Magazine. 6 (5): 211–220. Bibcode:1919GeoM....6..211R. doi:10.1017/S0016756800202690.
- Rastall, R. H. (1925). "On the Tectonics of the Southern Midlands". Geological Magazine. 62 (5): 193–222. Bibcode:1925GeoM...62..193R. doi:10.1017/S0016756800102791.
- Rastall, R. H. (1926). "Note on the Geology of the Bath Springs". Geological Magazine. 63 (3): 98–104. Bibcode:1926GeoM...63...98R. doi:10.1017/S0016756800083825.
- Rastall, R. H. (1927). "The Limestone of the Kinta Valley, Federated Malay States". Geological Magazine. 64 (9): 410–432. Bibcode:1927GeoM...64..410R. doi:10.1017/S001675680010370X.
- Rastall, R. H. (1923). "Some Points in Sedimentary Petrography". Geological Magazine. 60 (1): 32–39. Bibcode:1923GeoM...60...32R. doi:10.1017/S0016756800002259.
- Rastall, R. H. (1930). "The Petrography of the Hunstanton Red Rock". Geological Magazine. 67 (10): 436–458. Bibcode:1930GeoM...67..436R. doi:10.1017/S0016756800099593.
- Rastall, R. H. (1931). "The Tertiary Igneous Geology of the British Isles: An Essay-Review". Geological Magazine. 68 (3): 121–126. Bibcode:1931GeoM...68..121R. doi:10.1017/S0016756800095479.
- Rastall, R. H. (1938). "On Brookite Crystals in the Dogger". Geological Magazine. 75 (10): 433–440. Bibcode:1938GeoM...75..433R. doi:10.1017/S0016756800091871.
- Rastall, R. H. (1939). "On Rutile in the Dogger". Geological Magazine. 76 (3): 109–115. Bibcode:1939GeoM...76..109R. doi:10.1017/S0016756800070734.
- Rastall, R. H. (1941). "The Ore Deposits of the Skiddaw District". Proceedings of the Yorkshire Geological Society. 24 (5): 328–343. Bibcode:1941PYGS...24..328R. doi:10.1144/pygs.24.5.328.
- Rastall, R. H. (1944). "Rainfall, Rivers, and Erosion". Geological Magazine. 81 (1): 39–44. Bibcode:1944GeoM...81...39R. doi:10.1017/S0016756800073830.

=== Books ===
- Lake, Philip; Rastall, Robert Heron (1910). A Textbook of Geology. Arnold's Geological Series (1st ed.). London: Edward Arnold. (2nd edition, 1912)
  - Lake, Philip; Rastall, Robert Heron (1922). 1922 reprint of 1920 3rd edition. (4th edition 1927)
  - 1958 reprint of 1941 5th edition. 1910.
- Hatch, Frederick Henry; Rastall, R.H.; Crook, Thomas (1913). The petrology of the sedimentary rocks: a description of the sediments and their metamorphic derivatives. Textbook of petrology; v.2. London: George Allen. (The geologist Thomas Crook (1876–1937) was made O.B.E. in 1936. "Obituary. Mr. Thomas Crook, O.B.E". Nature. 139: 141. 23 January 1937. doi:10.1038/139141a0.)
  - Hatch, F.H.; Rastall, R.H. (1923). The petrology of the sedimentary rocks : a description of the sediments and their metamorphic derivatives. Textbook of petrology; v. 2 (2nd ed.). London: George Allen & Unwin.
  - The petrology of the sedimentary rocks. Textbook of petrology; v. 2 (3rd ed.). London: G. Allen & Unwin, Ltd. 1938. LCCN 38034072; jointly authored by F.H. Hatch and R.H. Rastall, revised by Maurice Black (There are several subsequent editions with various editors.)
- Rastall, Robert Heron (1916). Agricultural Geology.
- Rastall, Robert Heron (1923). The Geology of the Metalliferous Deposits.
- Rastall, Robert Heron (1927). Physico-chemical Geology.
