= Michael Russell (scientist) =

British geologist

Michael John Russell
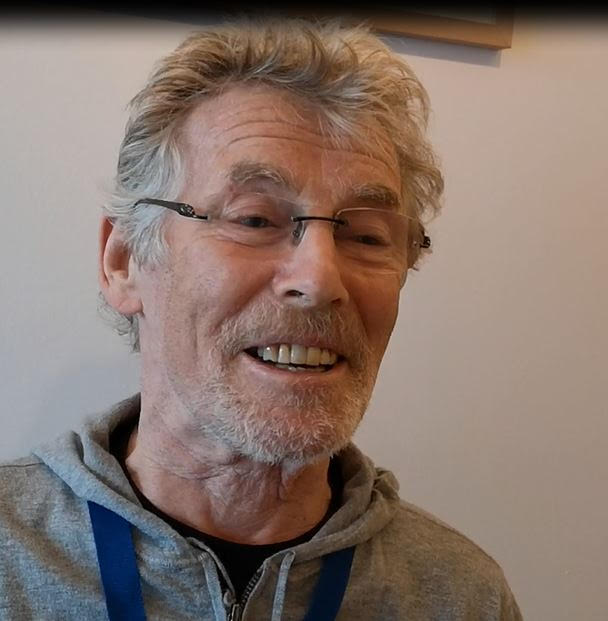
- Mike Russell
- Born: 1939 (age 86–87); London
- Citizenship: British
- Education: Queen Mary College, University of London; University of Durham
- Known for: Submarine Alkaline Hydrothermal Vent theory for the Origin of Life
- Awards: William Smith Medal, Geological Society of London 2009 NASA Exceptional Scientific Achievement Medal 2018
- Scientific career
- Fields: Geology
- Workplaces: University of Strathclyde; University of Glasgow; Jet Propulsion Laboratory, California Institute of Technology

Michael J. Russell is a British geologist who works on the origin of life.

Russell is the originator of the theory that life emerged at alkaline submarine hydrothermal vents. Russell's theory is that hydrogen, hydrogen sulfide, and methane, released from submarine alkaline hydrothermal vents, acted upon nitrate, ferrous and ferric iron, carbon dioxide, and protons in ambient ocean waters to form simple organic molecules Russell studied 360-million-year-old mineral deposits in Ireland, which led to his insight that iron sulfide and hydroxide cells may have provided three-dimensional molds for the first cell walls.

== Career ==
Russell attended Chigwell School between 1950 and 1958, and then was an undergraduate in geology at Queen Mary College of the University of London. He worked as a mineral exploration geologist in the Solomon Islands and Canada prior to taking his PhD in geochemistry at the University of Durham. He taught at the Department of Applied Geology at the University of Strathclyde before joining the University of Glasgow as the Dixon Professor of Applied Geology. He was a visiting professor at the University of Grenoble. He was NASA senior research fellow and then a principal scientist at the Jet Propulsion Laboratory, California Institute of Technology from 2006 until 2019 and a member of the NASA Astrobiology Institute until 2021.

Russell has appeared on BBC programmes including Horizon's Life on Mars and Origin of Life.

== Awards and honours ==
In June 2009, Russell was awarded the William Smith Medal from the Geological Society of London for his lifetime contributions to applied geology. In 2018, he was awarded NASA's Exceptional Scientific Achievement Medal for his research into the emergence of life.
