= Howard Fox =

British businessman, naturalist, geologist, gardener (1836–1922)

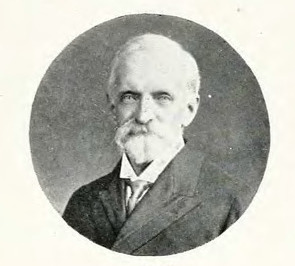
- Born: 10 December 1836; Falmouth
- Died: 15 November 1922
- Children: Charles Masson Fox
- Parents: Alfred Fox (father); Sarah Lloyd (mother)

Howard Fox (10 December 1836 – 15 November 1922) was a shipping agent and played a large part in the economic and cultural development of the town of Falmouth, Cornwall. He was a member of the influential Fox family of Falmouth.

== Business interests ==
The Fox family had built up a diversified set of interests beyond the original shipbroking office. Howard Fox led the central board of the company.

=== Consular roles ===
He was Consul for the United States of America in Falmouth from 1874 until 1905, in succession to his father. In April 1870, he was appointed Vice-Consul for the Republic of the Ecuador. He was appointed Consul for Sweden and Norway in 1896. He became Consul for Denmark in 1909.

=== Harbour and Dock development ===
He was also chairman of Falmouth Docks Company for 45 years, succeeding his father.

== Scientific interests ==
He had wide general interests in science and supported the Royal Cornwall Polytechnic Society and the British Association. At the British Association's Annual Meeting held in Nottingham in September 1893, he read a paper to the Geology Section "The radiolarian cherts of Cornwall". In 1884, he attended the British Association meeting in Montreal, Quebec, Canada.

He was a member of the Geological Society of London. He served as president of the Royal Geological Society of Cornwall in 1893–1894, and in 1897 was awarded the RGSC's prestigious Bolitho Gold Medal.

He was also interested in ornithology, botany and horticulture. He was given the exotic garden developed by his Uncle Robert, at Rosehill, Falmouth, in 1872.

== Philanthropy and Peace activities ==
Along with many other members of the Fox family, he was a Quaker, and engaged with them in various philanthropic projects. He was a founder of Falmouth County School for Girls.

In 1878, he seconded a motion at a public meeting of Falmouth Chamber of Commerce, urging the Government "to maintain in the present crisis [The Russo-Turkish War] the principles of strict neutrality".

== Birth, marriage and family ==
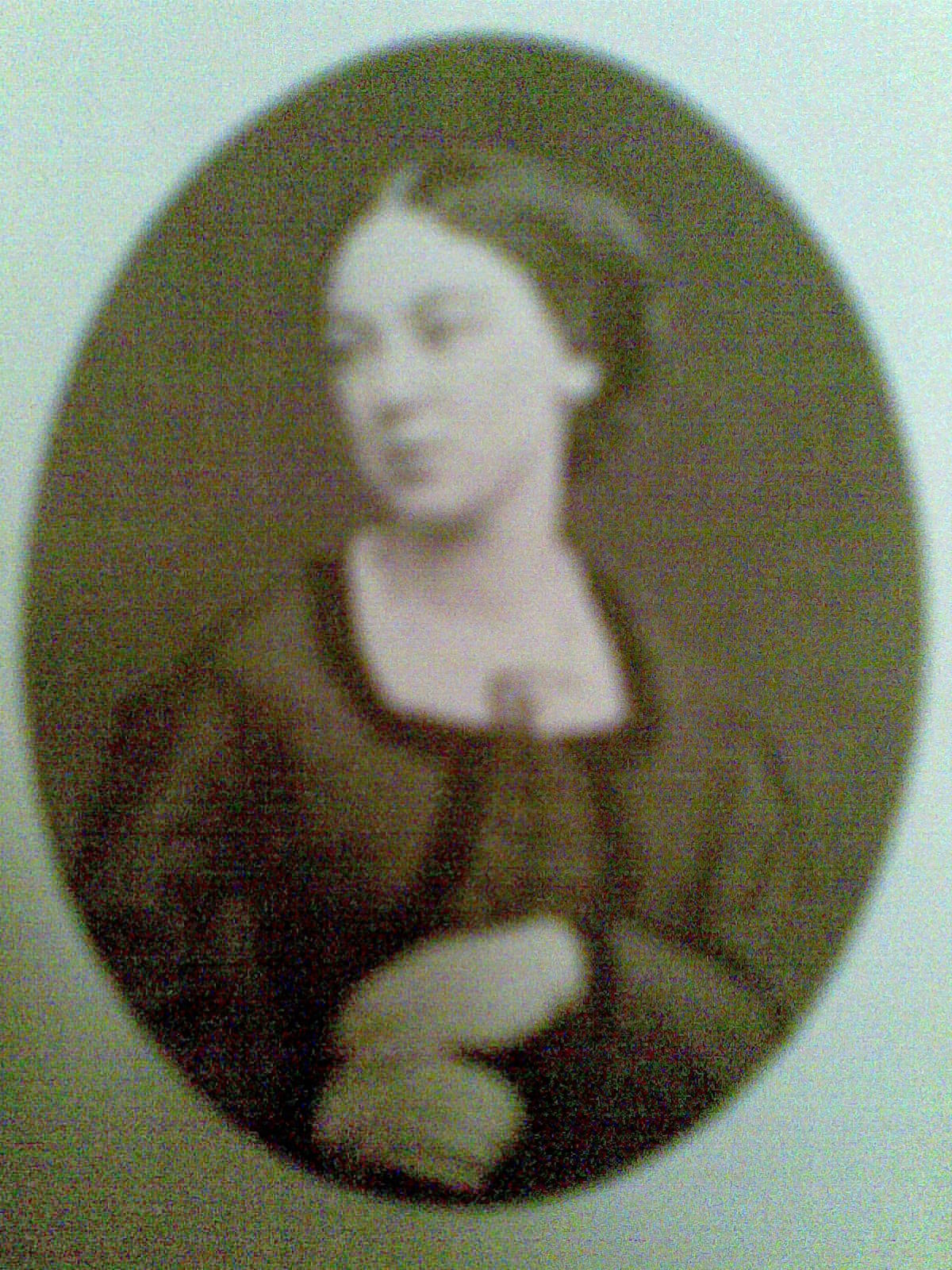
Blanche Fox

He was born on 10 December 1836 at Wodehouse Place, Falmouth, the third son of the twelve children of Alfred Fox (1794–1874) and his wife, Sarah Lloyd (1804–1890).

He married Olivia Blanche Orme (1844–1930) in 1864. They had four children, two boys and two girls. His son, Charles Masson Fox, was a timber merchant and a director of the family shipping broking company, G. C. Fox. His son, Howard Orme Fox (17 August 1865 – 7 June 1921) was an Imperial Civil Servant. His daughters, Olivia Lloyd Fox (born 1868) and Stella (Born 1876), gave Rosehill Garden to Falmouth Town Council.

He died 15 November 1922 at Rosehill, Falmouth.

== Publications ==
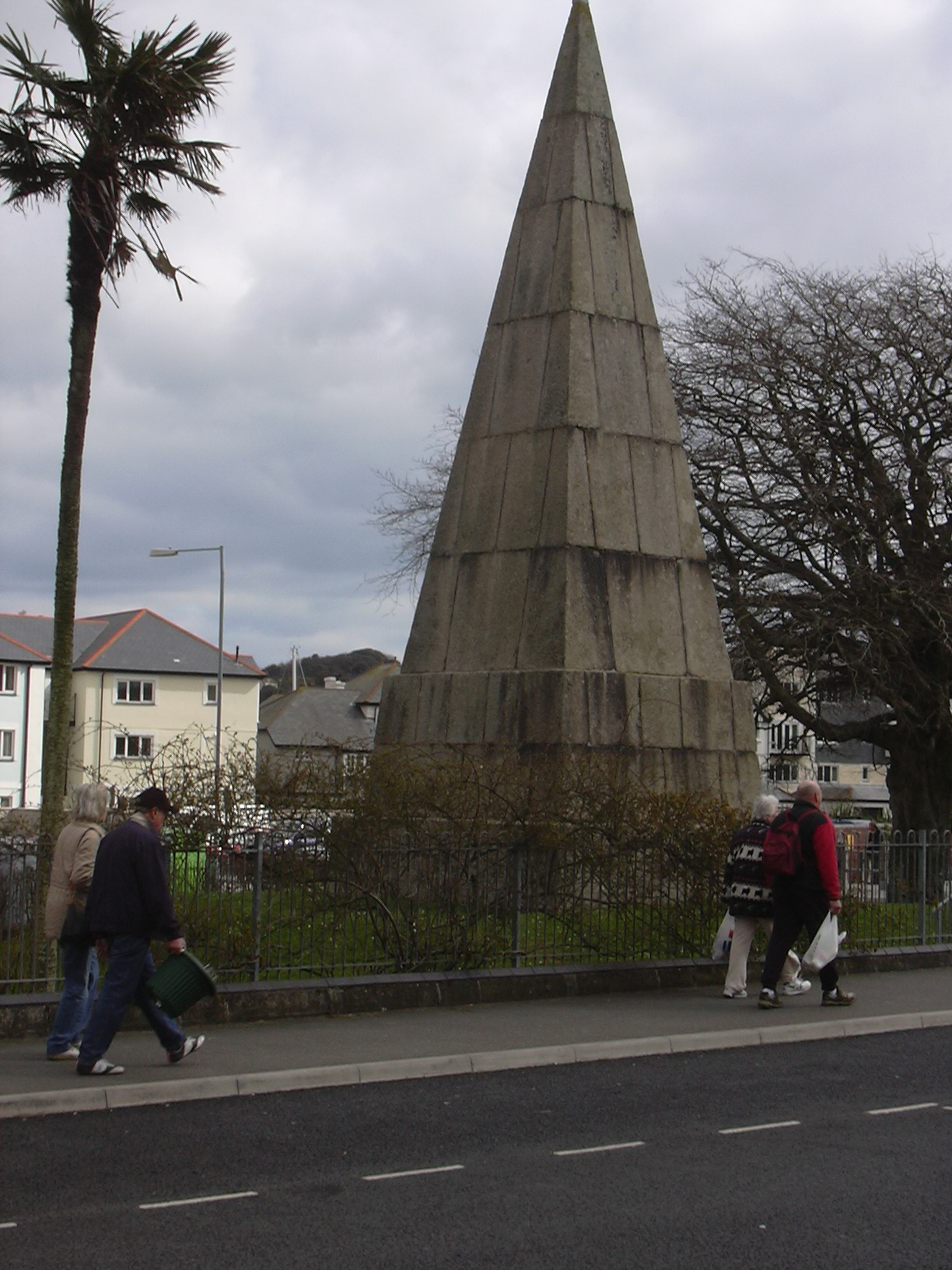
Killigrew monument, Falmouth

- Observations in further illustration of the history and statistics of the Pilchard Fishery (1879).
- "The flying squid or calamar", Falmouth : Royal Cornwall Polytechnic Society, 1879
- "Further Killigrew Mss. Relating to the Killigrew Pyramid or Monument at Falmouth and Other Matters" Journal of the Royal Institution of Cornwall. No.42.
- "Further Notes on the Devonian Rocks and Fossils in the Parish of St Minver." Transactions of the Royal Geological Society of Cornwall. Vol.13, Part 1, 1905.
- "Notes on some coast-sections at the Lizard : On a radiolarian chert from Mullion Island" by Howard Fox and J. J. H. Teall. The Quarterly Journal of the Geological Society, Vol.49 (1893) pp. 199 and 211.
- "On a well-marked horizon of radiolarian rocks in the lower Culm Measures of Devon, Cornwall and West Somerset" by George Jennings Hinde and Howard Fox. The Quarterly Journal of the Geological Society, 1895; v. 51; issue.1–4; p. 609-NP;
- "On Some Nodular Concretions, Resembling Fossil Wood and Fossil Fish : Treworden Wood, Launceston." Transactions of the Royal Cornwall Geological Society, 1894.
- "On the gneissic rocks off the Lizard; with notes on the specimens" by Howard Fox and J. J. H. Teall, The Quarterly Journal of the Geological Society of London. Vol.44. 1888 p519-544
- "Supplementary Notes on the Cornish Radiolarian Cherts and Devonian Fossils" Transactions of the Royal Geological Society of Cornwall, Vol.12, Part 4, 1899.
- On a soda feldspar rock at Dinas Head, North Coast of Cornwall, Cambridge University Press, 1895.
