= Baly =

Baly is a surname. Notable people with the surname include:

- Ahmed Baly (born 1976), Egyptian judoka
- Edward Charles Cyril Baly (1871–1948), British chemist
- Joseph Sugar Baly (1816–1890), English doctor and entomologist
- Monica Baly (1914–1998), English nurse, historian, and advocate
- William Baly (1814–1861), English physician

== See also ==
- Bally (disambiguation)
