= Hollingworth Cliffs =

The Hollingworth Cliffs (80°26′S 25°33′W) are a line of cliffs to the south of Mount Absalom in the Herbert Mountains of the Shackleton Range in Antarctica. They were photographed from the air by the U.S. Navy in 1967, and surveyed by the British Antarctic Survey, 1968–71. In association with the names of glacial geologists grouped in this area, they were named by the UK Antarctic Place-Names Committee after Sydney E. Hollingworth, a British geologist who specialized in the Pleistocene geology of northwest England, and was Professor of Geology at University College London, 1946–66.
