= Peter Styles (geologist) =

British geologist

- Born: September 1950 (age 76)
- Education: Wadham College, Oxford; Newcastle University
- Known for: Applied and environmental geophysics
- Awards: William Smith Medal (2014)
- Scientific career
- Fields: Geology
- Workplaces: Keele University

Peter Styles (born September 1950) is a British geologist. He is Emeritus Professor of Applied and Environmental Geophysics at Keele University. After growing up in Northumberland Styles read physics at Wadham College, Oxford, graduating in 1972. He then studied for a doctorate at the University of Newcastle-upon-Tyne on plate tectonics in the rift valley of East Africa. As well as plate tectonics Styles has specialised in the detection of abandoned mine workings using microseismology and microgravity. He is a past president of the Geological Society of London.

Styles served two terms on the board of the British Geological Survey and has advised the UK government of underground storage of nuclear waste. In 2008 he took part in a visit to King Abdulaziz University, Jeddah to set up accreditation of geoscience degrees by the Geological Society. Styles has also studied low frequency noise generated by windfarms.

He was awarded the William Smith Medal of the Geological Society of London in 2014.
