= Ziad Rafiq Beydoun =

Lebanese petroleum geologist

- زياد رفيق بيضون
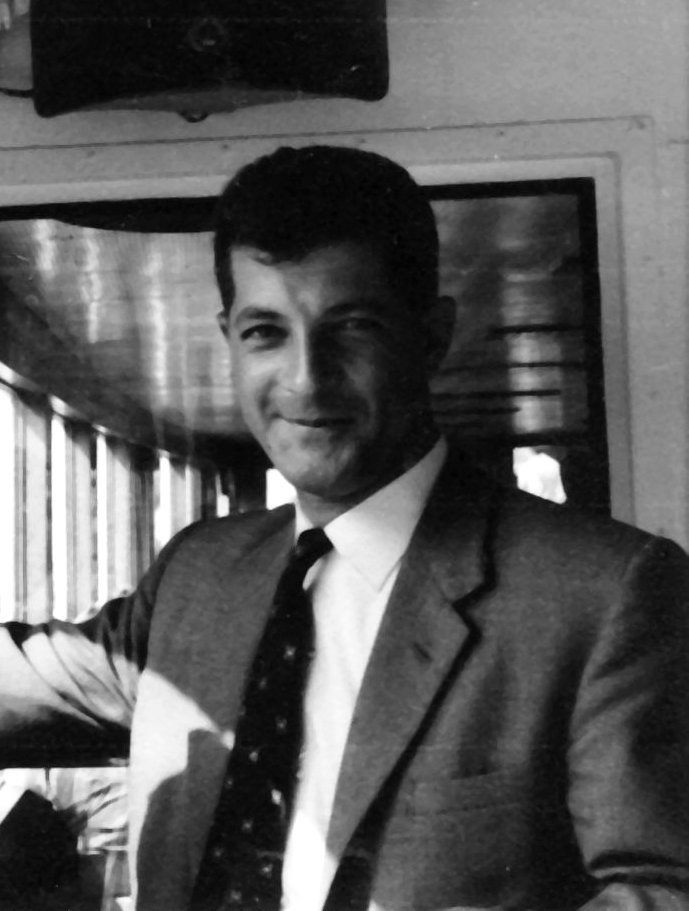
- Born: 9 December 1924; Beirut
- Died: 7 March 1998 (aged 73)
- Education: St Peter's College, Oxford, American University of Beirut
- Known for: expert in the petroleum geology of the Middle East
- Awards: William Smith Medal (1994), National Order of the Cedar (1995), Science Medal of the Yemen Republic (1998)
- Scientific career
- Fields: Geology
- Workplaces: Iraq Petroleum Company, Partex Ltd, Marathon Oil Corporation

Ziad Rafiq Beydoun (Arabic: زياد رفيق بيضون; 1924–1998) was a Lebanese petroleum geologist, leading authority on the geology of the Middle East and Emeritus Professor at the American University of Beirut (AUB).

== Background and education ==
Born in Beirut in 1924, Ziad ("Don") Beydoun was from a distinguished family of Mutasharifs who had served in the Ottoman Empire. He was the eldest son of the District Governor in Palestine under the British Mandate. He was educated at St. George's School, Jerusalem and St. Luke's School, Haifa. He returned to Beirut to obtain a first-class degree in political science and history at the AUB. He then studied at St Peter's College, Oxford where he obtained a degree and doctorate in geology.

== Early career with the Iraq Petroleum Company ==
=== Syria, Iraq, Qatar and Trucial Coast 1948-53 ===
On 27 August 1948, he joined the Iraq Petroleum Company (IPC) as an exploration geologist with a field party led by Mike Morton in north-west Syria. Beydoun was multi-lingual, speaking Arabic, English, French and Turkish, and spent the next 15 years working for the company in its oil concession areas across the Middle East. From 1949 to 1951, he was field geologist and resident geologist with various IPC associate companies: Qatar Petroleum Company, Mosul Petroleum Company and Petroleum Development (Trucial Coast) Ltd, where he was resident geologist for the Ras Sadr No.1 well. In 1951, he went to the Basrah Petroleum Company and in 1952 he was field and resident geologist with the Mosul Petroleum Company in the Ain Zalah field.

=== South-western Arabia 1953-58 ===
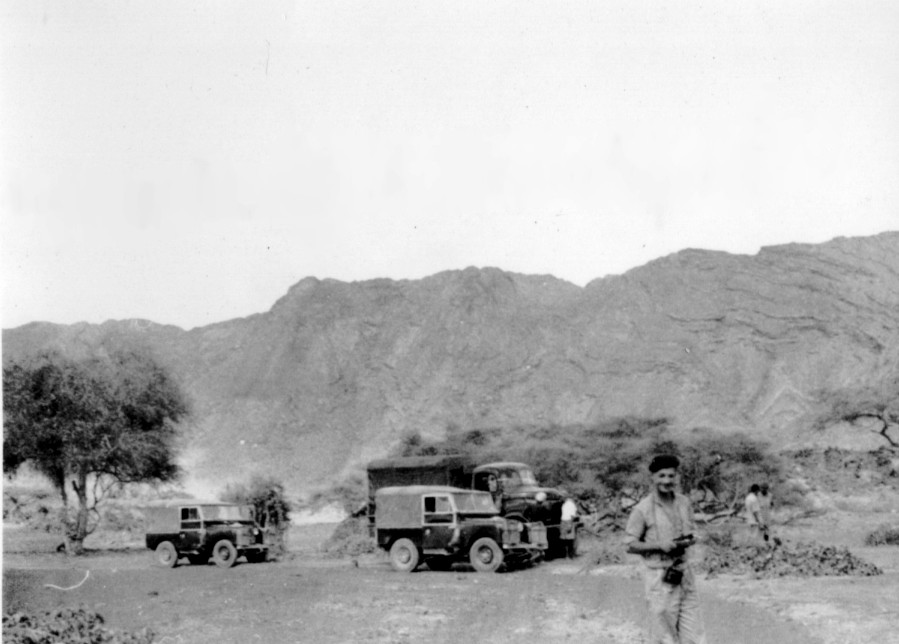
Ziad Beydoun in south-west Arabia, 1953

In 1953, Beydoun conducted a remarkable one-man survey of the island of Socotra, an island full of malaria and tribal intrigue. Later in the year, he began his association with Petroleum Concessions (Aden Protectorates) Ltd. The company, another IPC associate, had been created to explore the territory that was loosely known as "The Hadhramaut", in today's Yemen. The leader of the geological party was his old mentor Mike Morton. When Morton was called away to take part in the Duqm landings in Oman, Beydoun took over the party and led it for successive seasons until 1958. IPC withdrew from the Hadhramaut in 1961, but Beydoun would continue to publish books and papers on the geology of the Yemen. On his return to Oxford, Beydoun completed his doctorate on the basis of his field work in that country.

== His remaining career in the oil industry and academia ==
Upon rejoining IPC, Beydoun was posted to Qatar but following retrenchment of company operations, he was seconded to Calouste Gulbenkian's firm, Partex. In 1963 he returned to Lebanon, taking up the post of assistant professor at AUB and acting as geology advisor to the Ministry of National Economy. In 1966 he took charge of Marathon Oil's Middle East and North African evaluation studies, returning to the AUB in 1970 as professor of geology while retaining an advisory role with Marathon.

In 1977, Beydoun and his colleagues at the AUB formed the Lebanese Geological Society. In 1983, he married Muntaha Saghiyeh (a distinguished archaeologist in her own right). In 1987, he became a scientific director of a World Bank/UNDP project on hydrocarbons in the Red Sea and the Gulf of Aden. In 1990, he was patron of the Oxford University Expedition to north Yemen, which undertook a geological study of Kohlan in Hajjah province. In 1992, he was made Emeritus Professor of the AUB.

== Books and awards ==
Ziad Beydoun wrote extensively about the geology of the Middle East, with numerous books and articles (see selected bibliography below) including The Stratigraphy and Structure of the Eastern Aden Protectorate (1964) and The Middle East: Regional Geology and Petroleum Resources (1998). In 1994, he received the William Smith Medal from the Geological Society of London for his "outstanding achievement in petroleum geology". He joked that it was good to receive the medal while he was still alive. In 1995, he was awarded the Medal of the National Order of the Cedar by the Government of Lebanon for "distinguished services to geological investigations and research". The Ziad Beydoun Memorial Award is given each year at the annual convention of the American Association of Petroleum Geologists in recognition of the best AAPG poster session paper presented at the previous year's International conference.

Ziad Beydoun died on 7 March 1998. In late September of the same year, the Prime Minister of Yemen presented his widow with the Republic's Science Medal, awarded posthumously to him in recognition of his unique contribution to the study of Yemeni geology.

=== Selected bibliography ===
- "Synopsis of the Geology of the Eastern Aden Protectorate". Report 21st. International Geological Congress, Copenhagen, 21st, 131–149. 1960.
- Geological map of Eastern Aden Protectorate, British Directorate of Overseas Surveys, 1:1,000,000. (D.O.S. (Geol.) 1148). 1963.

The Stratigraphy and Structure of the Eastern Aden Protectorate, Overseas Geology and Mineral Resources Supp. Ser., Bull. Supp. 5, 107pp. HMSO London. 1964.

- "Eastern Aden Protectorate and part of Dhufar", Geology of the Arabian Peninsula, U.S.G.S. Profess. Paper 560H, 49pp. Washington D.C. 1966.
- "Aden Protectorate and Dhufar", Lexique Stratigraphique International, (ed.) L.Duberret, Vol. III, fasc. 10b2, 126 p, CNRS Paris. (with Greenwood, J.E.G.W.,) 1968.
- "Southern Arabia and Northern Somalia: Comparative Geology", Phil. Trans. Royal Society London, A 267: 267–292. 1970.
- "Geology of Socotra Island, Gulf of Aden" Quarterly Journal of the Geological Society, London, 125: 413–446. (done with Bichan, H.R.,) 1970.
- "The Gulf of Aden and North West Arabian Sea", Ocean Basins and Marins, 6, The Indian Ocean, (eds) A.E.M. Narin and F.G.Stehli. Ch. 6: 253–313, Pienum Pub. Corp., New York. 1982.
- "The Petroleum Resources Of The Middle East: A Review", Journal of Petroleum Geology, 9: 5-28. 1986.
- The Middle East: Regional Geology and Petroleum Resource, Scientific Press, Beaconsfield UK, 292 p. 1988.
- "Hydrocarbon prospects of the Red Sea-Gulf of Aden: A Review", Journal of Petroleum Geology, 12: 125–144. 1989a.
- "Hydrocarbon potential of the Deep (pre-Mesozoic) Formations in the Middle East Arab Countries", Proceeding OAPEC/ADNOC Seminar on Deep Formations in the Arab countries: Hydrocarbon Potential and Exploration Techniques, Abu Dhabi, Oct. 1989, 31–84.
- "Arabian Plate Hydrocarbon Geology and Potential – a Plate Tectonic Approach", AAPG Studies in Geology No. 33, Tulsa, OK, 77p. 1990.
- "Arabian Plate Hydrocarbon Geology And Potential - A Plate Tectonic Approach",(Eds), Studies In Geology, American Association Of Petroleum Geologists, 33, 77, 1991.
- "Red Sea-Gulf of Aden: Re-assessment of Hydrocarbon Potential", Marine and Petroleum Geology, 9 (5): 478-485 (with Sikander, A.H.,) 1992.
- "The Red Sea-Gulf of Aden: Biostratigraphy, Lithostratigraphy and Paleoenvironments", Journal of Petroleum Geology, 15, 135–156. (with Hughes, G.W.,) 1992.
- "The Qishn Formation, Yemen: Lithofacies and Hydrocarbon Habitat", Marine and Petroleum Geology, 10 (4): 364–372. (with Bamahmoud, M.O., and Nani, A.S.O.,) 1993.
- Geological Evolution and Hydrocarbon Potential of the Deep Formations in The Middle East Arab Countries Proceeding to the Second Seminar on hydrocarbon potential of the Deep Formations in the Arab Countries, OAPEC, Cairo, Oct. 1994. 52p. 1994.
- "Productive Middle East Clastic Reservoirs: Their Depositional Settings and Origin of their Hydrocarbons: Sedimentary Facies Analysis", (ed.) A.G. Plint, Special Public. International Association of Sedimentologists, 22: 331–354. 1995.
- "Sedimentary Basins of the Republic of Yemen: Their Structural Evolution and Geological Characteristics", Revde I’Instit. Francais du Petrole, 51 (6): 763–775.
- "Rift sedimentation and Tectonics in the Red Sea and Gulf of Aden Region", Journal of Petroleum Geology, 19: 235–245, 1996.
- "Introduction to the revised Mesozoic Stratigraphy and Nomenclature for Yemen", Marine and Petroleum Geology, 14, special issue on Yemen, 1997.
