= Royal Geological Society of Cornwall =

- Formation: 1814; 212 years ago
- Type: Scientific society
- Headquarters: King Edward Mine, Cornwall, United Kingdom
- Location: Cornwall
- Official language: English
- Website: http://geologycornwall.com/

The Royal Geological Society of Cornwall is a geological society originally based in Penzance, Cornwall in the United Kingdom. It was founded in 1814 to promote the study of the geology of Cornwall, and is the second oldest geological society in the world, after the Geological Society of London which was founded in 1807.

== History ==
The first President of the society was Davies Gilbert, the first Secretary John Ayrton Paris, and other notable members include Humphry Davy (some of whose papers are held by the Society), and William Gregor, who discovered titanium.

The society's first premises was a house in North Parade, Penzance and in 1853 the Borough of Penzance put forward plans for a new public building on the west side of Penzance. It was planned to have the Borough offices, county court and police station in the east wing, the two floors of the west wing housing the RGSC's museum and a public hall between the two run by a public company. The building, known as St John's Hall, was opened in 1867 and still exists although, in July 2016, the west wing was occupied by Penzance's relocated public library. In 2023 the RGSC moved its base to King Edward Mine, near Camborne, although meetings and lectures are usually held at Camborne School of Mines and other facilities on the Penryn Campus, and via Zoom, and there is an active programme of field meetings and site visits.

== Notable people associated with the society ==
- Francis Arthur Bather (1863–1934), palaeontologist, geologist and malacologist.
- Henry Samuel Boase (1799–1883), geologist and author.
- Edward Budge (1800–1865), geologist and theologian.
- Elizabeth Catherine Thomas Carne (1817–1873), geologist and author.
- Joseph Carne (1782–1858), geologist.
- Joseph Henry Collins (1841–1916), mining engineer, mineralogist and geologist
- Richard Quiller Couch (1816–1863), naturalist and medical practitioner.
- Richard Edmonds (1801–1886), antiquary and geologist.
- John Forbes (1787–1861), physician to Queen Victoria.
- John Hawkins (1761–1841), traveller and geologist.
- John Mawe (1766–1829), mineralogist and dealer in minerals.
- Matthew Paul Moyle (1788–1856), surgeon and geologist.
- Christopher Nigel Page (1942-2022), palaeobotanist.
- John Ayrton Paris (1785–1856), first secretary and researcher into the high rate of scrotal skin cancer among men working in copper-smelting in Cornwall and Wales.
- Charles William Peach (1800–1886), discovered fossils in Cornwall.
- John Rogers (1778–1856), Anglican clergyman and biblical scholar.
- Frances Wall, geochemist, Professor of Applied Mineralogy at Camborne School of Mines.

== Bolitho Medal ==
The society awards the Bolitho Medal for notable achievement in geology. The first award was made to Robert Etheridge in 1896. It was awarded in 1948 to Sir Arthur Russell, 6th Baronet. The following list only includes recipients with an existing article in Wikipedia.

- 1896 - Robert Etheridge
- 1897 - Howard Fox
- 1898 - Joseph Henry Collins
- 1900 - Clement le Neve Foster
- 1903 - William Augustus Edmond Ussher
- 1906 - Andrew Ketcham Barnett
- 1911 - Clement Reid
- 1912 - George Barrow
- 1916 - Arthur Smith Woodward
- 1917 - J.S. Flett
- 1926 - R.H. Rastall
- 1927 - Alfred Brammall
- 1931 - Leonard James Spencer
- 1932 - Richard Hansford Worth
- 1933 - Henry George Dines
- 1937 - E.B. Bailey
- 1948 - Sir Arthur Russell, 6th Baronet
- 1949 - Eileen Hendriks
- 1971 - G.F. Mitchell
- 1973 - Kingsley Dunham
- 2016 - Christopher Nigel Page

== Past presidents ==
- 1814–1839 Davies Gilbert
- 1840–1856 Sir Charles Lemon, FRS
- 1857–1862 Augustus Smith
- 1863–1867 Charles Fox, FGS
- 1868–1871 Hugh Seymour Tremenheere, CB
- 1871–1879 Warington Smyth
- 1880–1881 A Pendarves Vivian, FGS
- 1881–1882 Leonard Courtney
- 1883–1890 Warington Smyth
- 1891–1892 John St Aubyn, 1st Baron St Levan
- 1893–1894 Howard Fox
- 1901–1902 Clement le Neve Foster
- 1903–1904 Joseph Henry Collins
- 1907–1908 Andrew Ketcham Barnett
- 1911–1912 Joseph Henry Collins
- 2016–2020 Christopher Nigel Page
- 2023– Frances Wall
