= Robert Etheridge (geologist) =

English geologist and palaeontologist (1819–1903)

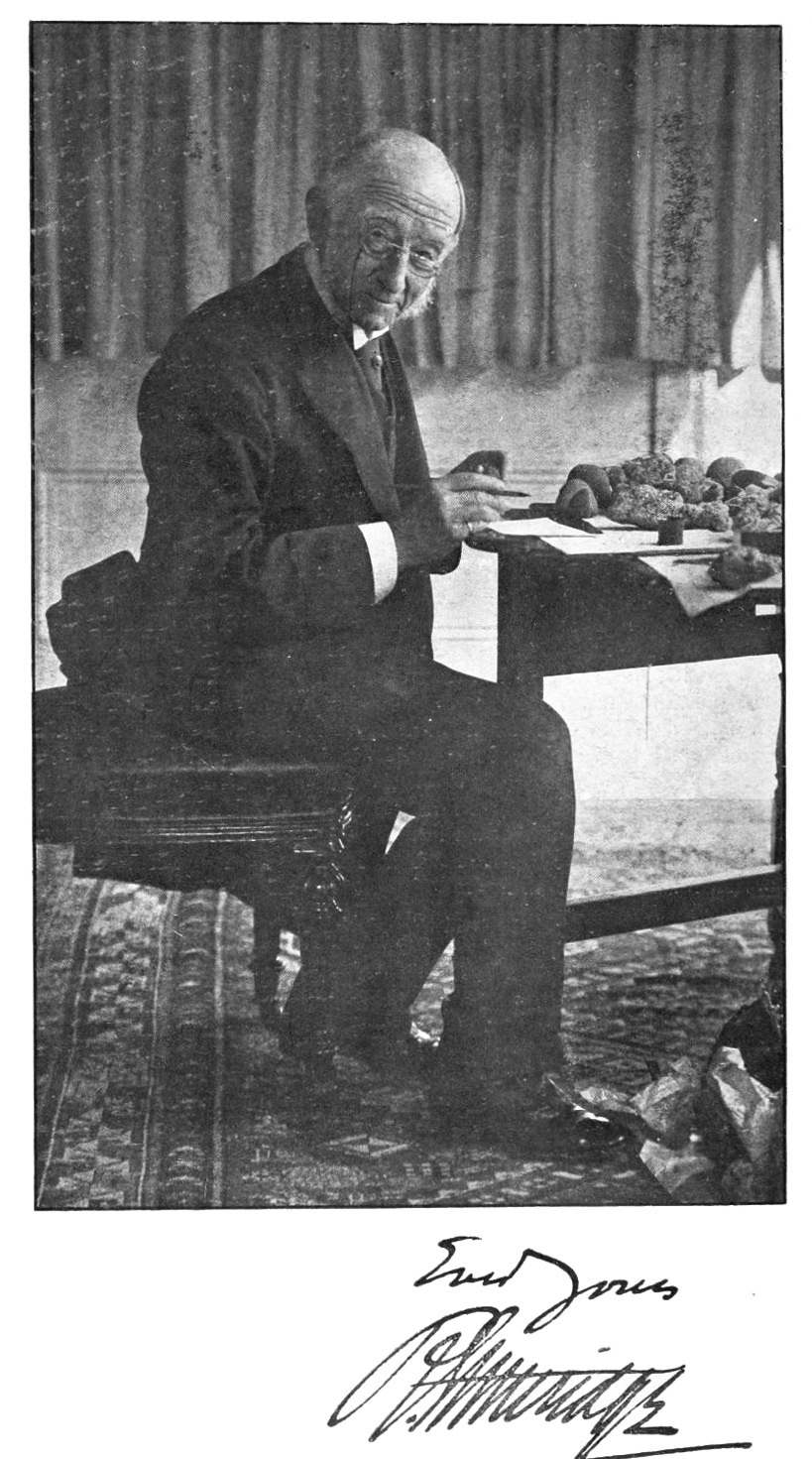
Robert Etheridge

Robert Etheridge FRS FRSE FGS (3 December 1819 – 18 December 1903) was an English geologist and palaeontologist.

== Biography ==
Etheridge was born at Ross-on-Wye, in Herefordshire, the son of Thomas Etheridge and his wife Hannah Pardoe. After an ordinary school education in his native town, he obtained employment in a business house in Bristol. There he devoted his spare time to natural history pursuits.

At the Bristol Philosophical Institution for lectures, he encountered William Sanders and Samuel Stutchbury, and in 1850 was appointed curator of its museum. He also became lecturer on botany in the Bristol medical school. In 1857, through the influence of Sir Roderick I. Murchison, he was appointed to a post in the Museum of Practical Geology in London, and eventually became palaeontologist to the Geological Survey.

In 1865 he assisted Prof. Huxley in the preparation of a Catalogue of Fossils in the Museum of Practical Geology. His chief work for many years was in naming the fossils collected during the progress of the Geological Survey, and in supplying the lists that were appended to numerous official memoirs. In this way he acquired an exceptional knowledge of British fossils, and he ultimately prepared an elaborate work entitled Fossils of the British Islands, Stratigraphically and Zoologically Arranged. Only the first volume dealing with the Palaeozoic species was published (1888). Etheridge also was author of several papers on the Rhaetic Beds, and of an important essay on the Physical Structure of North Devon, and on the Palaeontological Value of the Devonian Fossils (1867). He edited, and in the main rewrote, the second part of a new edition of John Phillips's Manual of Geology entitled Stratigraphical Geology and Palaeontology (1885). He was elected Fellow of the Royal Society in 1871, was awarded the Murchison Medal of the Geological Society of London in 1880 and was president of that Society in 1881-1882. In 1881 Etheridge was transferred from the Geological Survey to the geological department of the British Museum, where he served as assistant keeper until 1891. In 1896 he was the first recipient of the Bolitho Medal of the Royal Geological Society of Cornwall.

He died in Chelsea, London, on 18 December 1903. He is buried in Brompton Cemetery.

His son Robert Etheridge, Junior was also a palaeontologist.

== Spurious quotation ==
Etheridge is quoted in creationist literature as saying:

In all this great museum there is not a particle of evidence of transmutation of species. Nine-tenths of the talk of evolutionists is sheer nonsense, not founded on observation and wholly unsupported by fact. This museum is full of proofs of the utter falsity of their views.

The content of the statement differs in creationist books and the quote is often misattributed to Etheridge's son Robert Etheridge Jr. The origin of the quote is a letter from George Edward Post that appeared in the New York Evangelist for 10 September 1885.

It is possible that Post may have misrepresented Etheridge's views. Etheridge never wrote about the transmutation of species in his publications.
