= List of directors of the British Geological Survey =

This is a list of Directors of the British Geological Survey, or its equivalent, since foundation:

== Geological Survey of Great Britain, 1835–1965 ==
- 1835–1855 Henry De la Beche
- 1855–1871 Roderick Murchison
- 1871–1881 Andrew Ramsay
- 1882–1901 Archibald Geikie
- 1901–1914 Jethro Teall
- 1914–1920 Aubrey Strahan
- 1920–1935 John Flett
- 1935–1936 Bernard Smith
- 1937–1945 Edward Battersby Bailey
- 1945–1950 William McLintock
- 1950–1960 William Pugh
- 1960–1965 James Stubblefield

== Institute of Geological Sciences, 1965–1984 ==
- 1965–1966 James Stubblefield
- 1967–1975 Kingsley Dunham
- 1976–1979 Austin Woodland
- 1979–1984 Malcolm Brown

== British Geological Survey, 1984-present ==
- 1984–1985 Malcolm Brown
- 1985–1987 Innes Lumsden
- 1987–1990 Geoffrey Larminie
- 1990-1998 Peter J. Cook
- 1998–2006 David Falvey
- 2006–2019 John Ludden
- 2019–present Karen Hanghøj
