= Robert Etheridge, Junior =

Paleontologist and museum curator (1847–1920)

Formal portrait of Etheridge, signed by L. W. Appleby. Australian Museum

Robert Etheridge (23 May 1847 – 4 January 1920) was a British palaeontologist who made important contributions to the Australian Museum.

== Biography ==
Etheridge was born in Cheltenham, Gloucestershire, England, the only son of the palaeontologist, Robert Etheridge and his wife Martha, née Smith. He was educated at the Royal School of Mines, London, under Thomas Huxley, and was trained as a palaeontologist by his father.

In 1866 Etheridge came to Australia, working under Alfred Richard Cecil Selwyn on the Victorian geological survey. In 1878–1880 with H. Alleyne Nicholson, Etheridge published a Monograph of the Silurian Fossils of the Girvan District in Ayrshire.

Robert Etheridge Jr. is noted for a transition in the study of Australia's vertebrate palaeontology. Prior to the works of Etheridge and fellow scientist Gerard Krefft fossil material was sent to experts overseas, but both these workers were confident they were capable of performing these analyses.

== Sources ==
- "Robert Etheridge Jr, Curator, 1895-1919". Australian Museum.
- Serle, Percival (1949). "Etheridge, Robert". Dictionary of Australian Biography. Sydney: Angus & Robertson.
- G. P. Walsh, 'Etheridge, Robert (1846-1920)', Australian Dictionary of Biography, Vol. 8, MUP, 1981, pp 442-443. Retrieved on 12 October 2008

Awards
Preceded by Ralph Tate	Clarke Medal; 1895 jointly with Robert Logan Jack	Succeeded by Augustus Gregory
