= Sydney Ewart Hollingworth =

British geologist and academic

- Born: 7 November 1899; Flore, Northamptonshire
- Died: 23 June 1966 (aged 66); London, England
- Education: University College London (DSc, 1931); Clare College, Cambridge (BSc, 1921)
- Occupation: Geologist
- Years active: 1921–66

Sydney Ewart Hollingworth FGS (7 November 1899 – 23 June 1966) was a British geologist and academic who specialized in the Pleistocene geology of northwest England, and was professor of geology at University College London, 1946–66. The Hollingworth Cliffs in Antarctica and the mineral "Hollingworthite" are named after him.

== Early life and education ==
He was born in Flore, Northamptonshire, the son of Alice Masters Hollingworth and Charles Hollingworth, a foreman in the Army Ordnance Department. He was educated at Northampton School, and then joined the Army at the end of the First World War. He was wounded in active service.

After the end of the war, he entered Clare College, Cambridge, where he was influenced by John Edward Marr and Alfred Harker. Hollingworth took first-class honours in both parts of the natural sciences tripos and in 1921 was awarded the Harkness scholarship. In 1921, he graduated from Cambridge and 10 years later earned a DSc from the University College London.

== Career ==
=== British Geological Survey ===
For 25 years, he worked at the British Geological Survey, followed by 20 years as the Yates-Goldsmid Professor of Geology at University College, London.

His work with the BGS took him to Cumberland, where he worked with the group tasked with resurveying the West Cumberland coal and iron-ore fields. Along with Frederick Murray Trotter and others, he helped create new maps and memoirs of Brampton, Whitehaven, Gosforth, and Cockermouth districts of Cumberland. During this time he became an expert on the Pleistocene geology of the region, and his 1931 thesis was devoted to the glaciation and drumlin development in Edenside and the Solway Plain, and the subject formed the basis of his 1931 thesis, The Glaciation of Western Edenside and Adjoining Areas and the Drumlins of Edenside and the Solway Basin.

In 1934, the BGS transferred Hollingworth to the West Midlands section and he began years of fieldwork in Cambridgeshire. When the Second World War began in 1939, Hollingworth joined a team tasked with updating and increasing geological knowledge of the Jurassic ironstones, particularly those in Northamptonshire such as Northampton Sand Formation. These were particularly vital at that time as they served as the UK's chief domestic source of iron ore, which played a crucial part in steel production required by the war effort.

=== University College London ===
Hollingworth returned to academia after the war ended, becoming the Yates-Goldsmid Professor of Geology at University College, London. Over the next two decades, he embarked on new areas of research while expanding the department's facilities, equipment and prestige.

In the mid-1950s, during a sulphur shortage, Hollingworth took a research trip to Chile with students and staff. While there he recognized additional geological significance to the area and returned in the early 1960s to make new geological maps in Chile. He also went the Caledonian orogeny of Norway, investigating ancient rocks north of the Arctic Circle.

In academia, his area of focus were geomorphology, structural geology, economic geology and conservation. In 1965, the university opened a subdepartment devoted to hydrogeology thanks to Hollingworth's initiative.

=== Geological Society ===
Hollingworth became a fellow of the Geological Society of London in 1922 and remained active throughout his life. For 17 years, he served on its council, was secretary from 1949–56, served twice as vice president (1956–58 and 1962–64), and was president from 1960–62. The Geological Society awarded Hollingworth the Lyell fund in 1938 and the Murchison Medal in 1959.

== Personal life ==
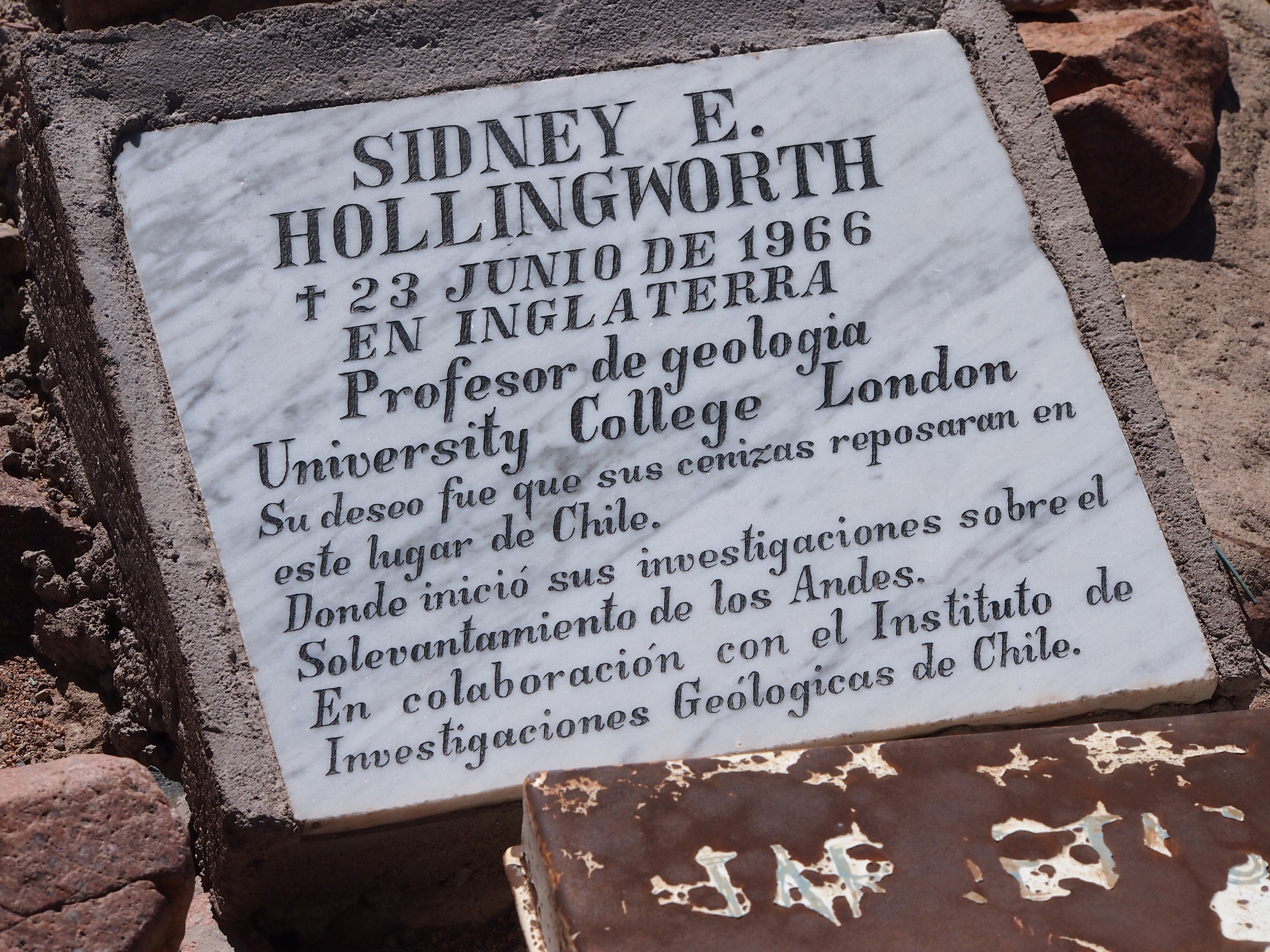
His grave stone nearby San Pedro de Atacama

In 1927, Hollingworth married Anne Mary Lamb, with whom he had two sons. He died in 1966 at University College Hospital in London after a sudden illness. His trips to Chile brought him a love of the Andes, where his ashes were scattered.

== Legacy ==
In 1965, Eugen Friedrich Stumpfl and Andrew M. Clark named a sulfide mineral "Hollingworthite" of the Cobaltite group. The British Antarctic Survey of 1968–71 named the Hollingworth Cliffs in Antarctica after named for him.
