= Regal Petroleum =

UK business

Regal Petroleum plc
- Company type: Public limited company
- Industry: Oil and gas industry
- Headquarters: London, United Kingdom
- Key people: Chris Hopkinson(Executive Chairman); Sergii Glazunov (CEO)
- Website: www.regalpetroleum.com

Regal Petroleum plc is a petroleum company based in London with assets in Romania, Ukraine, Greece, and Egypt. It was founded by Frank Timiş in November 1996, and is listed on the London Alternative Investment Market.

Official Website redirects to Enwell Energy
