= Bally Creek =

River in the United States of America

Coordinates: 47°46′48″N 90°31′18″W

Bally Creek is a stream in Cook County, Minnesota, in the United States.

Bally Creek was named for Samuel Bally, a county commissioner.

== See also ==
- List of rivers of Minnesota
