= Yorkshire Geological Society =

- Abbreviation: YGS; Yorks. Geol. Soc.
- Formation: 1 December 1837; 188 years ago
- Type: NGO,
- Legal status: Charity Registered in England, no. 220014
- Region served: Yorkshire and northern England more generally
- General Secretary: General Secretary (acting): Mr Paul Hildreth
- President: Dr Nick Riley
- Vice_Presidents: Mr Paul Hildreth
- Main organ: Annual General Meeting and Elected Council (which also serves as Board of Trustees)
- Affiliations: About 20 Corresponding Societies - local geological societies and other bodies across the region
- Website: https://www.yorksgeolsoc.org.uk
- Formerly called: Yorkshire Geological and Polytechnic Society

The Yorkshire Geological Society (previously The Yorkshire Geological and Polytechnic Society) is a learned, professional and educational charity devoted to the earth sciences, founded in 1837. Its work is centred on the geology of Yorkshire, and the north of England more generally, ranging from Northumbria and Cumbria in the north to Nottinghamshire, Derbyshire and Leicestershire in the south. The Society has around 600 members, the majority living within this region but with significant proportions of UK national and overseas members. It also has working relationships with around 20 Corresponding Societies and other affiliated local geological and conservation societies and organisations, and with many of the universities of the region, as well as with the British Geological Survey, particularly its headquarters at Keyworth, Nottinghamshire. The Society runs a wide-ranging programme of both indoor and field meetings for members, public lectures and conferences in various locations across its region, and coordinates and promotes with the Corresponding Societies a "Yorkshire Geology Month" every May, in cooperation with the Corresponding Societies and other local groups. The Society also publishes on the earth sciences, notably in its biannual Proceedings, published continuously since 1839, and its Circular, published seven times a year. The Society also publishes field guides, conference reports and books from time to time.

== History ==
The Society is the fourth oldest geological society in the United Kingdom, following the Geological Society of London (1807), the Royal Geological Society of Cornwall (1813) and the Edinburgh Geological Society (1834). Reflecting the interests of many of its coal-owner and engineer original members the Society and its Proceedings first published in 1839, the Society originally covered mining and general engineering and technology, and then archaeology also. However, from the earliest days its membership was much wider than just the West Riding, and the Society very quickly gained the active support the leading national geological figures of the day as Honorary Members. With the establishment of the Yorkshire Archaeological and Topographical Society in 1863, the Society gradually ceded its archaeological activities and publishing to the new Society, and 1903 it adopted the present name of Yorkshire Geological Society for both the society and its Proceedings. The Society also organises and coordinates the annual Yorkshire Geology Month, normally held through the month of May each year (though not held in 2020 due to the Coronavirus emergency).

From the late 19th century onwards the Society developed ever-closer links with the emerging earth science departments in the university colleges and universities of Yorkshire and adjacent counties and with the Geological Survey, particularly at its former Leeds and Newcastle offices, and these close links remain today with the British Geological Survey's headquarters at Keyworth, Nottinghamshire. The Society has also developed close relationships with what are today twenty-four "Corresponding Societies" -mainly local geological societies and groups which between then cover most of the north of England and parts of central England, from Cumbria and Northumberland in the north to Leicestershire in the south. The Society's 170-year-old geological library is housed in the Leeds University Library.

== Membership ==
The society has about 600 Ordinary, Affiliate, Student and Life Members. No qualifications are required for membership, and the members have a wide range of backgrounds and interests, including senior earth sciences academics, professionals, researchers and students, lecturers and teachers, members of local geological societies and those with a general interest in geology and the environment. The Society's former more than 100 Institutional Members are now Subscribers to the Geological Society of London's Lyell Collection. The Annual General Meeting of members elects the Officers and Council who also serve as Trustees of the Society as a Registered Charity, and who run the Society between annual general meetings.

== Publications ==
Published continuously since 1839, the biannual Proceedings of the Yorkshire Geological Society publishes original research and review papers in the earth sciences, frequently, though by no means only, with special reference to the geology of the north of England. Since 2011 the digitised Proceedings from 1839 to date have been made available through the Geological Society of London's online Lyell Collection. The Society's illustrated Circular is issued seven times a year and gives full details of the Society's programme of meetings, public lectures and field excursions, and the annual Yorkshire Geology Month. The Circular also carries other news and views about the Society and the geology of the North of England. The Society also publishes occasional special publications, conference reports and field guides, including: Yorkshire Rocks and Landscapes and Northumbrian Rocks and Landscapes.
