= Albert W. Bally =

American geologist (1925–2019)

Bert Bally
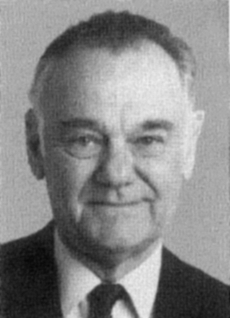
- Born: April 21, 1925; The Hague, Netherlands
- Died: July 30, 2019 (aged 94); Houston, Texas, U.S.
- Education: University of Zurich
- Awards: William Smith Medal, Gustav Steinmann Medal, Sidney Powers Memorial Award
- Scientific career
- Fields: Geology, geophysics, seismology
- Workplaces: Rice University

Albert Walter Bally (April 21, 1925 – July 30, 2019) was an American geologist, previously the Harry Carothers Wiess Professor of Emeritus at Rice University. He died in July 2019.

== Career ==
Bally started his career at Shell Oil Company, retiring as Chief Geologist after 27 years in 1981. After retirement, he joined Rice University as chair of the Department of Geology and Geophysics. He remained active in the department until his death in 2019.

In 1988, Bally was elected President of the Geological Society of America. He died on July 30, 2019.

== Awards ==
- William Smith Medal of the Geological Society of London, 1982
- Gustav Steinmann Medal of the Deutsche Geologische Gesellschaft, 1987
- Special Commendation Award of the Society of Exploration Geophysicists, 1995
- Sidney Powers Memorial Award of the American Association of Petroleum Geologists, 1998
- GeoLegends of the American Association of Petroleum Geologists, 2017
