= British Geological Survey =

Geological survey

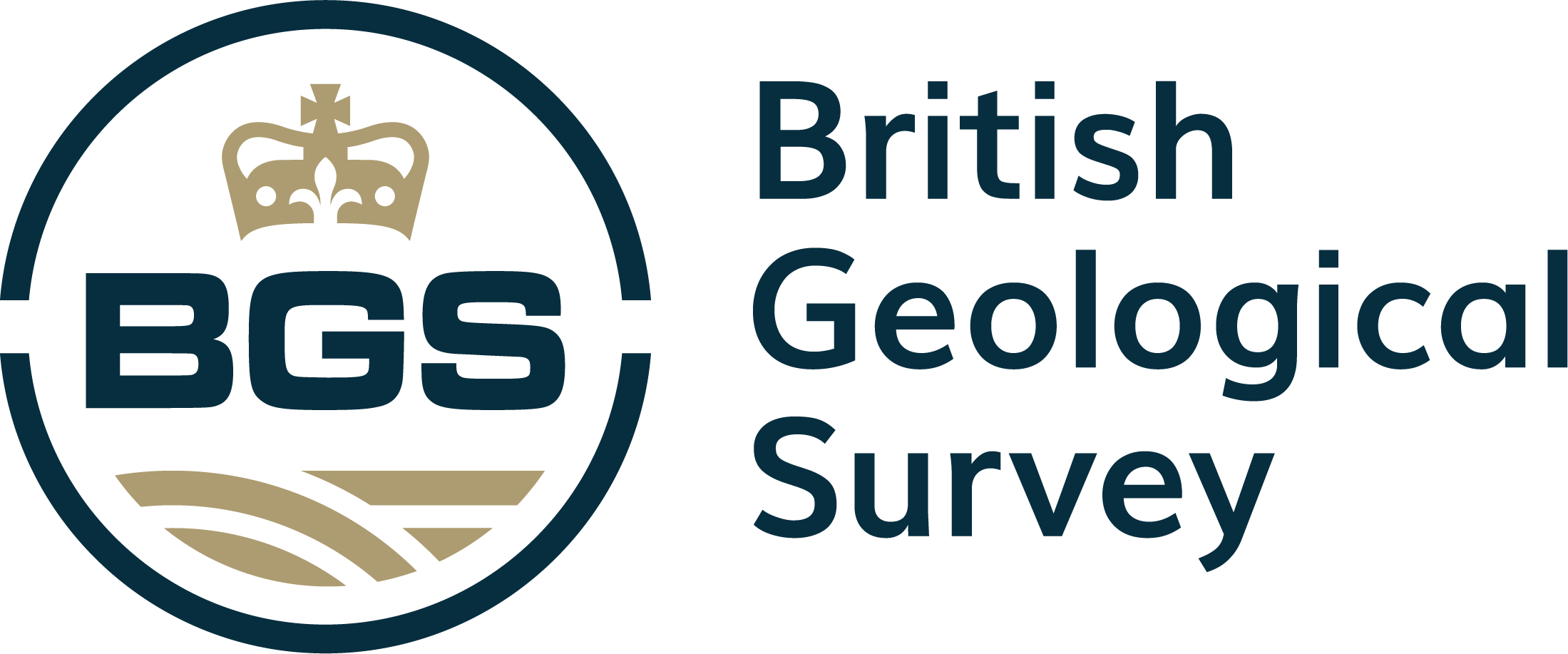
- Abbreviation: BGS
- Formation: 1835
- Legal status: Government organisation
- Purpose: Geoscience
- Location: Keyworth, Nottinghamshire, England
- Region served: United Kingdom
- Director: Karen Hanghøj
- Parent organisation: UK Research and Innovation (via NERC)
- Budget: £57m around 50% from the Science Budget
- Website: www.bgs.ac.uk

The British Geological Survey (BGS) is a partly publicly funded body which aims to advance geoscientific knowledge of the United Kingdom landmass and its continental shelf by means of systematic surveying, monitoring and research.

The BGS headquarters are in Keyworth, Nottinghamshire, England. Its other centres are located in Edinburgh, Wallingford, Cardiff and London. The current tagline of the BGS is: Understanding our Earth.

== History and previous names ==
The Geological Survey was founded in 1835 by the Board of Ordnance as the Geological Survey of Great Britain, under directorship of Henry De la Beche. This was the world's first national geological survey. It remained a branch of the Ordnance Survey for many years. In 1965, it was merged with the Geological Museum and Overseas Geological Surveys, under the name of Institute of Geological Sciences. In 1969, Beris Cox was the first female palaeontologist employed by the IGS.

On 1 January 1984, the institute was renamed the British Geological Survey (and often referred to as the BGS), a name still carried today. Since 1835, there have been 20 directors of the survey. In 2019, Karen Hanghøj was the first woman appointed to lead the survey.

From the 1860s, the survey in Scotland operated under the identity of the Geological Survey of Scotland.

Starting in 1975, female officers of the survey no longer had to resign upon getting married.

== Competences ==
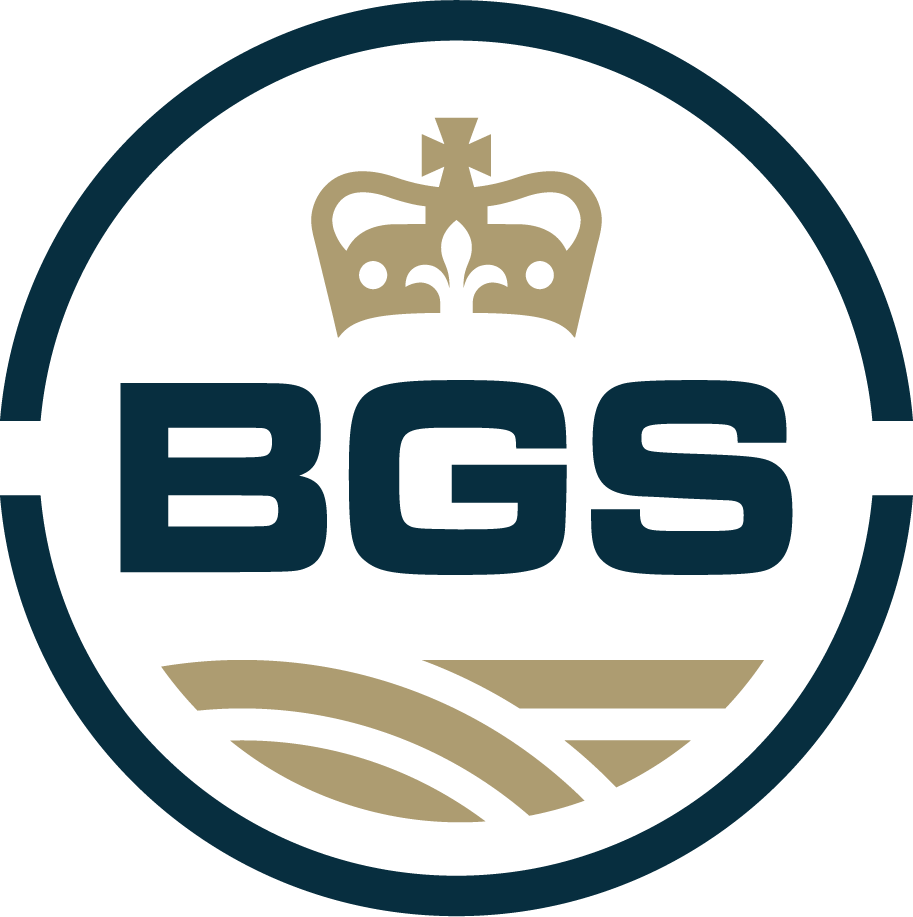
British Geological Survey roundel

The BGS advises the British government on all aspects of geoscience, as well as providing impartial advice on geological matters to the public, academics and industry. BGS is a component body of UK Research and Innovation which "works in partnership with universities, research organisations, businesses, charities, and government to create the best possible environment for research and innovation to flourish". The core outputs of the BGS include geological, geophysical, geochemical and hydrogeological maps, descriptions and related digital databases. Scientists at the BGS produced the first comprehensive map of African groundwater reserves. One of the key strategic aims for the next decade is to complete the transition from 2-D mapping to a 3-D modelling, to understand the 'architecture' of the subsurface. The current five-year strategy identifies four key priorities for the BGS: 'maps and models for the 21st century; a more secure energy transition; improved water security; and living with geological hazards'. The BGS has an annual budget of £57 million, about half of which comes from the government's science budget, with the remainder coming from commissioned research from the public and private sectors.

== Northern Ireland ==
The Geological Survey of Northern Ireland (GSNI) is part of Northern Ireland's Department for the Economy (DfE). The British Geological Survey provides staff, under contract to DfE, for the GSNI.

== See also ==
- Geospatial Commission
- List of directors of the British Geological Survey
- Systems geology
