= Via Devana =

Roman road that ran from Colchester to Chester, England

Coordinates: 52.60023°N 1.03529°W

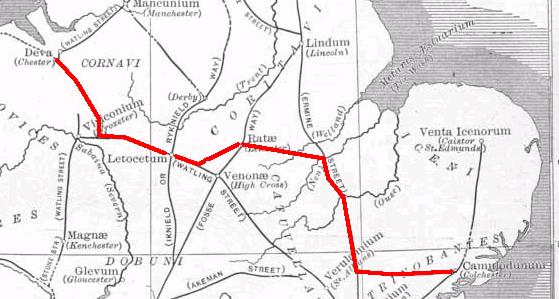
Roman Britain, with the Via Devana highlighted in red.

Via Devana is the name given to a Roman Road in England that ran from Colchester in the south-east, through Cambridge in the interior, and on to Chester in the north-west. These were important Roman military centres, and it is conjectured that the main reason the road was constructed was military rather than civilian. The Latin name for Chester is Deva and 'Via Devana' is thus 'The Chester Road'. Colchester was Colonia Victricensis, 'the City of Victory', and lays claim to be the oldest Roman city in Britain. The Via Devana had little civilian rationale, and the road eventually fell into disuse as it was not possible to maintain extensive public works following the withdrawal of the last Roman legion from Britain in 407. As a result, its route is difficult to find today, especially in its more northern reaches. It is omitted from some historians' maps for this reason, but most nowadays accept its existence. The undocumented name Via Devana was coined by Charles Mason, D.D., of Trinity College, Cambridge, who was also rector of Orwell, Cambridgeshire, and Woodwardian Professor of Fossils at Cambridge University from 1734. During his life, Mason compiled a complete map of Cambridgeshire, which was later published in 1808, long after his death.

== Route ==
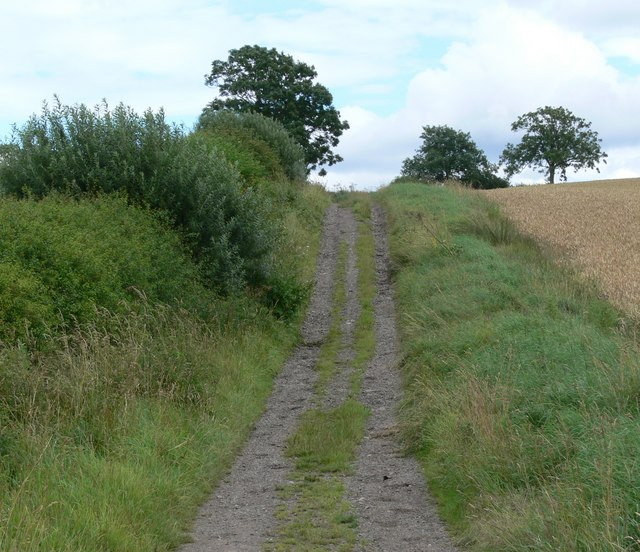
Via Devana in Leicestershire, July 2007

The Via Devana, from Colchester to Chester, enters this county (Leicestershire) near Cottingham, and, crossing the Welland, passes Medbourne, near Slanston Mill (sic), whence it is continued between the two Strettons to Leicester, where it joins the Fosse, which, however, it soon leaves to proceed to Grooby, whence it is carried by Ashby to Burton upon Trent.

— Topographical Dictionary of England (1831)

Its route ran north and west as follows:

- Colchester - Colonia Victricensis
- Wixoe (conjectured) - (possible fort)
- Cambridge - (Latin name: Cantabrigia. Roman Name: Durolipons or Duroliponte), now the main road through Cambridge from the station to Madgalene Bridge
- Huntingdon / Godmanchester (Durolipus or Durovigutum) where it crossed Ermine Street
- Corby
- Medbourne - The stretch from Medbourne to Leicester is broken, but where it exists is nowadays known as the "Gartree Road" and "Evington Footway"
- Leicester- (Ratae Corieltauvorum), meeting Fosse Way

There is speculation that finds in Moira indicates the Mason's route, reported in 1831, may have some factual basis.

- Mancetter (Manduessedum) where it joined Watling Street until
- Water Eaton - (Pennocrucium) to
- Newport, Shropshire - (Plesc which meant fortified place or one with palisade) it is here that it followed the same route as the A41 towards
- Whitchurch, Shropshire - (Mediolan or Mediolanum)
- Chester

== See also ==
- Roman roads in Britain
