= Jane Fawcett =

British code-breaker, singer, and preservationist

- Born: Janet Carolin Hughes; 4 March 1921
- Died: 21 May 2016 (aged 95); Oxford, England
- Other names: Jane Hughes
- Occupations: Preservationist, author, codebreaker, singer
- Known for: Decoding a message, which enabled the Royal Navy to sink the Bismarck

Jane Fawcett MBE (née Hughes; 4 March 1921 – 21 May 2016) was a British codebreaker, singer, and heritage preservationist. She recently became known for her role in decoding a message, which led to the sinking of the German battleship Bismarck. From 1963 to 1976 she served as the secretary of the Victorian Society. She wrote and edited works including The Future of the Past; Seven Victorian Architects; The Village in History and Save the City.

== Early life ==
Janet Carolin (or Caroline) Hughes was born on 4 March 1921 the daughter of George Hughes, the clerk of the Goldsmiths' livery company, and his wife, Margaret (nee Graham). Her paternal grandparents were Thomas McKenny Hughes, the 8th Woodwardian Professor of Geology at Cambridge University and Mary Caroline Hughes.

Jane was raised in London, attended Miss Ironside's School for Girls in Kensington, trained as a ballet dancer, and was admitted to the Royal Ballet School. As a young woman of 17, she was told she was "too tall" to be a professional dancer, and her promising ballet career ended. She was then sent to Zürich to learn German, shortly thereafter moving to the St Moritz ski resort.

After six months, she was told by her parents to return home to "come out" as a debutante. She found that lifestyle boring, "a complete waste of time" and was relieved when invited by a friend to apply to the Bletchley Park project.

== Wartime service ==
In 1940, at the age of 18, she was interviewed by senior codebreaker Stuart Milner-Barry, and joined the secret codebreaking project at Bletchley Park. She joined a group of women known as the "Debs of Bletchley Park", so called because they were women recruited from upper classes, debutantes, to work in secret as part of the Enigma project. Hughes was assigned to Hut 6, a "Decoding Room" of women only. The conditions were poor—dimly lit, poorly heated, and poorly ventilated—and the women worked long hours under extreme pressure. In Hut 6, Jane and other women like her would receive the daily Enigma keys and type them into their own Typex machines. They would then determine if the messages were recognizable German.

On 25 May 1941, Hughes and several other women were briefed on the search for the German battleship Bismarck. Shortly thereafter, she decoded a message referring to the Bismarck that detailed its current position and destination in France. The Bismarck was subsequently attacked by the Royal Navy and sunk on 27 May. This was the first significant victory by the codebreakers, demonstrating the utility of the project.

Her work did not come to light until decades later, during the 1990s, as it had been classified under Britain's Official Secrets Act. Compared with the publicly acknowledged heroics of the navy, Fawcett said "we felt slightly ashamed of having only done Bletchley, like also-rans. So when everything we had done, which we knew had been very hard work and incredibly demanding, suddenly showed its head and we were being asked to talk about it, it felt quite overwhelming. I'd never told a soul, not even my husband. My grandchildren were very surprised."

Fawcett was one of the human sources Michael Smith interviewed for his book, The Debs of Bletchley Park and Other Stories (2015).

== Singing career ==
Hughes' service at Bletchley ended in May 1945. After the war ended, she married Edward Fawcett, took his surname, and trained at the Royal Academy of Music. From the end of the war to the early 1960s, she had a 15-year career as an opera singer. She performed Scylla in Jean-Marie Leclair's Scylla et Glaucus and the Sorceress in Henry Purcell's Dido and Aeneas. She also performed as a solo recital singer.

== Architectural preservation ==
In 1963 Fawcett took an executive position with The Victorian Society, founded in 1957 as a heritage preservation organisation dedicated to preserving Victorian architecture and works. As its secretary, she was effectively the chief executive, working closely with the director, Sir Nikolaus Pevsner.

She was dubbed "the furious Mrs Fawcett" for her role in fighting with British Rail to preserve historic railway stations, and was instrumental in the 1967 preservation of St Pancras station in London and the gothic Midland Grand Hotel. She also worked to save much of London's Whitehall from destruction.

Her husband joined her in historic preservation work in 1965, joining first the Garden History Society, and then, in 1969, the National Trust in full-time work.

In 1976 Jane Fawcett was appointed MBE and stepped down from active leadership.

In later years she taught preservation at the Architectural Association School of Architecture.

== Personal life and death ==
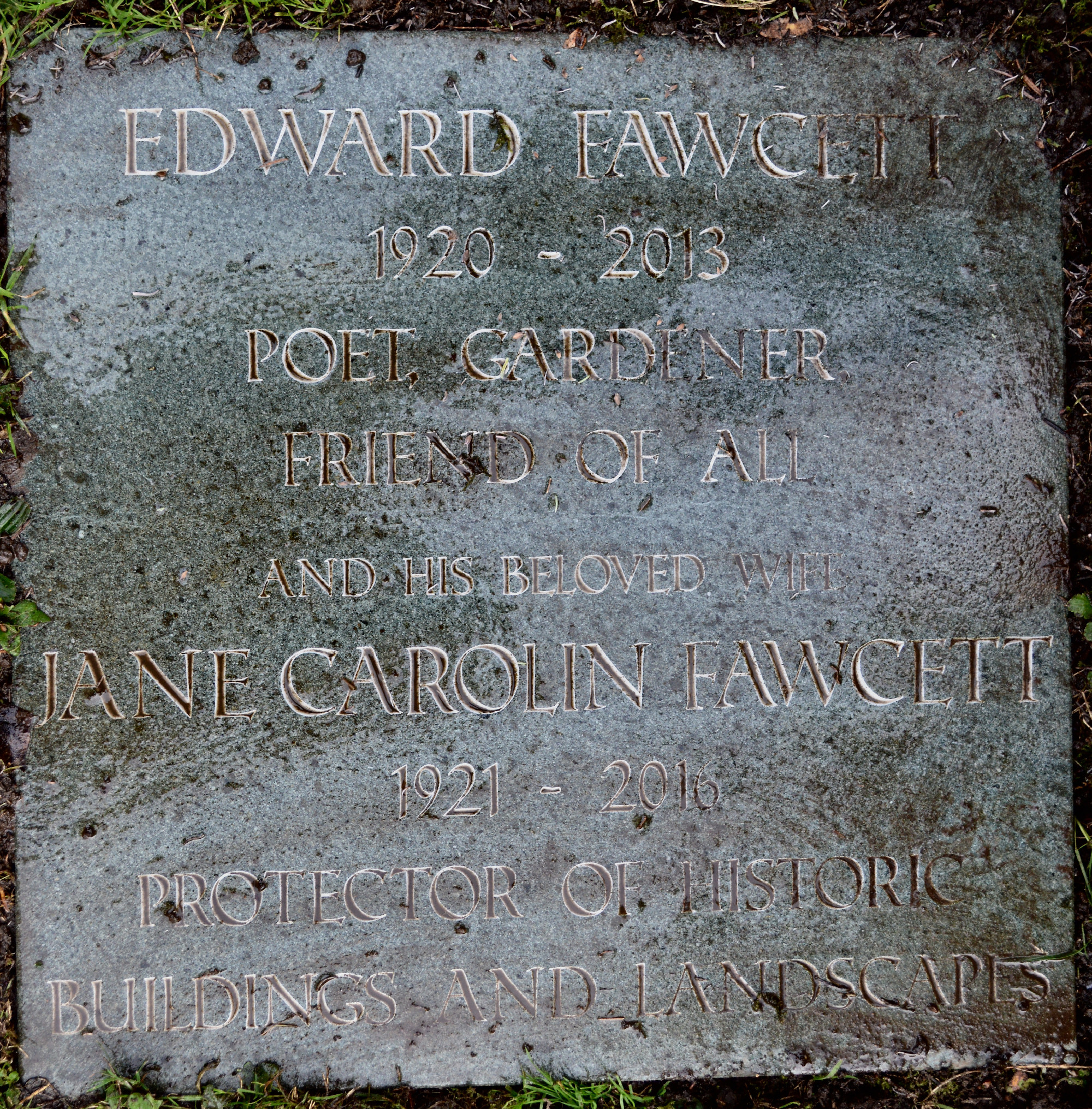
Memorial in the graveyard of St Peter's Church, Petersham, in Richmond, London

Hughes met Royal Navy officer Edward "Ted" Fawcett (22 September 1920 – 19 October 2013) during World War II and married him late 1947. The couple had two children, Carolin, an opera singer, and James, an experimental neurologist.

Fawcett died at home in Oxford on 21 May 2016 at the age of 95. Her memorial service was held at St Peter's Church, Petersham.

== Publications ==
The future of the past: Attitudes to conservation, 1174-1974 (1976). Edited by Jane Fawcett. Thames and Hudson

Save the City: a conservation study of the City of London (1979). David Lloyd, Jennifer Freeman, Jane Fawcett.

The Village in History (1988). Jane Fawcett, Nigel Nicolson, Graham Nicholson. Weidenfeld & Nicolson Ltd

Seven Victorian Architects (1990). Jane Fawcett. Pennsylvania State University Press

Historic Floors: Their History and Conservation (1998). Jane Fawcett. Butterworth-Heinemann

== Awards and recognition ==
- MBE (Member of the Order of the British Empire) in 1976
- Honorary fellow of the Royal Institute of British Architects, 1976

In 2019, Time created 89 new covers to celebrate women of the year starting from 1920; it chose “JANE FAWCETT AND THE CODEBREAKERS” for 1941.
