= Zachary Brooke =

Zachary Brooke may refer to:

- Zachary Brooke (theologian) (1716–1788), English clergyman and academic
- Zachary Brooke (historian) (1883–1946), British medieval historian and writer
