= Mary Caroline Hughes =

Geologist

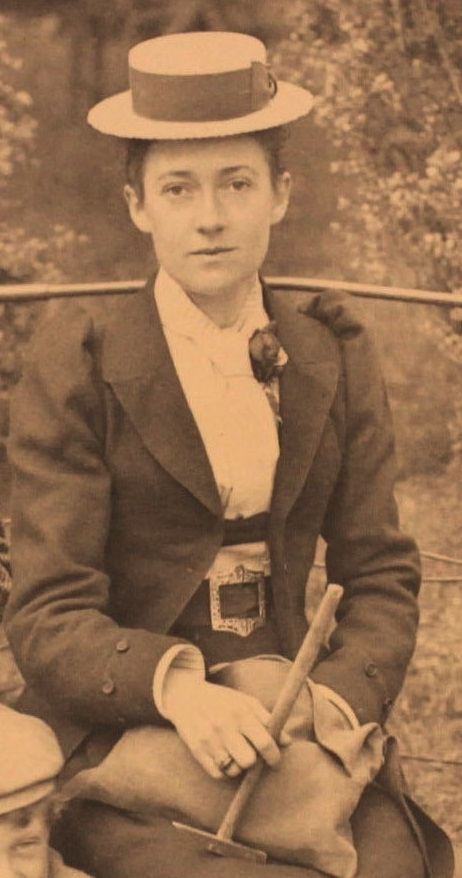
Mary Caroline Hughes, Malverns 1892

Mary Caroline Hughes (née Weston; 4 July 1862 – 9 July 1916) was an English geologist, artist and photographer. She acted as a chaperone to Cambridge University undergraduate female students enabling them to go on geology field trips for the first time. She also accompanied her husband Thomas McKenny Hughes to several International Geological Congress meetings.

== Early life and education ==
Mary Caroline Weston was born at Crosby Ravensworth, Cumbria, England, the daughter of the Reverend George Frederick Weston (1819–1887) and his second wife, Caroline James, the daughter of William James, MP for Carlisle.

Little is known of Mary's education but like so many young women of her social standing, she was a keen amateur archaeologist, botanist and artist. Her father was a cleric educated at Christ's College, Cambridge, who in the 1840s had travelled widely through Germany, Italy, Switzerland, Greece, Spain, the Ottoman Empire and Egypt.

In 1882 Mary married the Woodwardian professor Thomas McKenny Hughes (1831–1917). Until 1882 Fellows of Cambridge Colleges were debarred from matrimony and required to take holy orders..

== Cambridge ==
With the foundation of the women's colleges of Girton (1869) and Newnham (1871) in Cambridge many women were becoming interested in studying geology. However, female students were not allowed to go into the field with men without a chaperone so Mary accompanied them so they could attend fieldwork, in addition to lectures and practical classes. Two of the students that Mary accompanied were Gertrude Elles (1872–1960) and Elizabeth Dale (1868–1936).

== International Geological Congress ==
Mary attended International Geological Congress with her husband in Berlin (1885), London (1888), Washington (1891), Zurich (1894) and Russia (1897). Mary maintained photographs and diaries which are in the Sedgwick Museum of Earth Sciences Archives. Her vivid accounts are often embellished with sketches and herbaria.

== Family ==
Thomas and Mary had three sons, Tom, George and Alfred. Tom was killed in 1918 whilst carrying out aerial reconnaissance behind enemy lines in France. George was a clerk to the Worshipful Company of Goldsmiths, and Alfred was an entomologist. Mary's grandson, Graham Hughes, was later the art director of Goldsmiths' Company. Her granddaughter, Jane Fawcett was the British codebreaker, singer, and heritage preservationist.

== Later life and death ==
Mary was a keen artist and some of her work can be found at the Wimbledon Museum. Mary died in Cambridge in 1916. Her husband died the following year.

== Notable works ==
- "On the Mollusca of the Pleistocene Gravels in the Neighbourhood of Cambridge" (1888).
- Co-authored with her husband, the ‘Cambridgeshire' volume of the Cambridge County Geography series Cambridgeshire in the County Geography series, illustrated by her own photographs.

== Resources ==
Archives

6 boxes of records are at the Sedgwick Museum of Earth Sciences. This collection contains personal correspondence and notes, diaries, and scrapbooks relating to tours and visits made abroad in the 1880s and 1890s including the International Geological Congress. These contain a number of photographs, sketches and memorabilia.

A collection-level description is available on the Archives Hub. The Museum also has some of the records of Thomas McKenny Hughes.

17 volumes and 6 boxes of Hughes family records can also be found at Cambridge University Library: Department of Manuscripts and University Archives.
