= William Bellenden (disambiguation) =

William Bellenden (c. 1550–c. 1633) was a Scottish scholar.

William Bellenden may also refer to:

- William Bellenden, 1st Lord Bellenden (died 1671), Treasurer-depute of Scotland
- William Ballantine (priest) (1616–1661), a.k.a. William Bellenden
