= Aubrey Strahan =

British geologist

Sir Aubrey Strahan
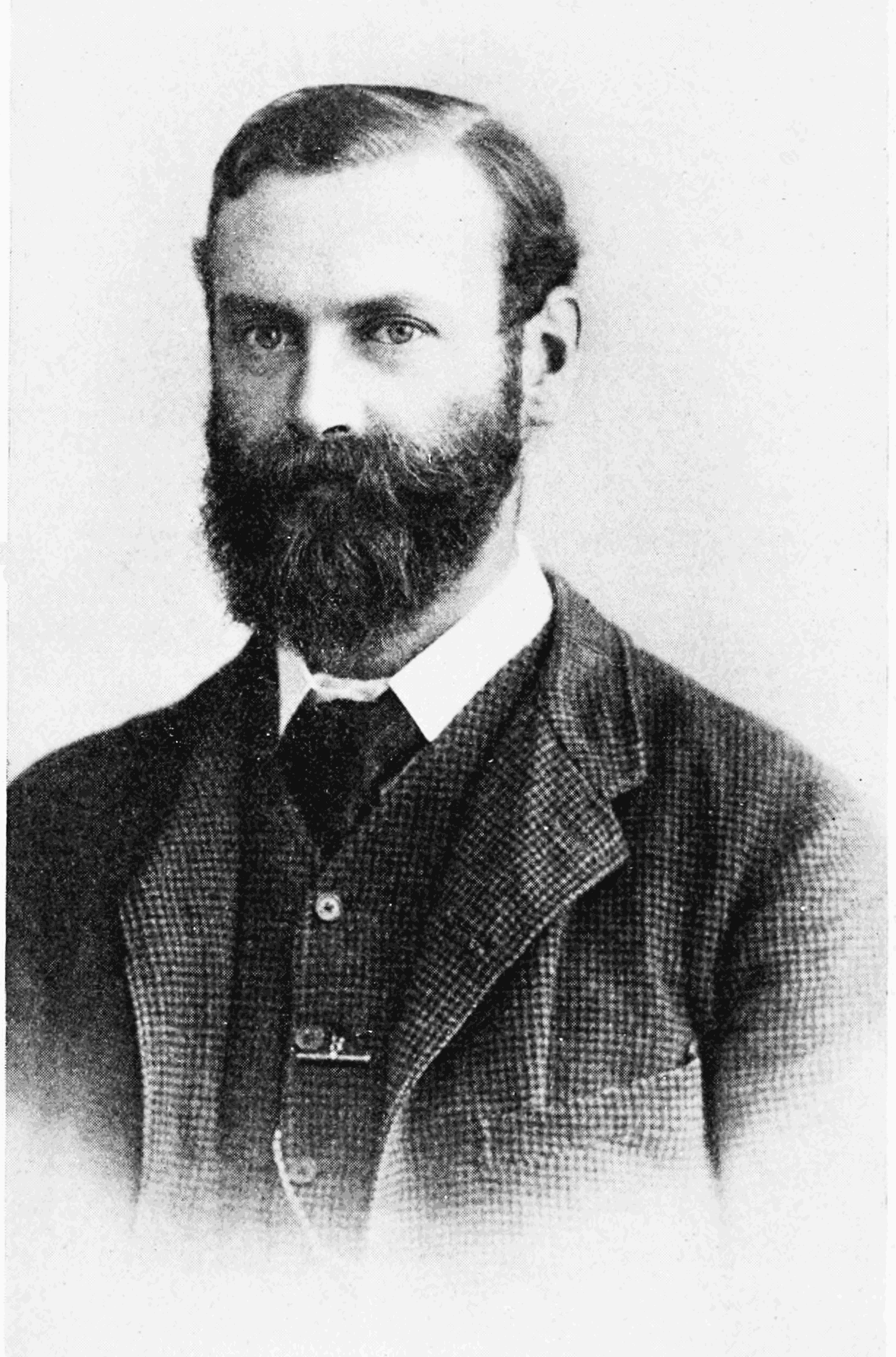
- Aubrey Strahan in 1904
- Born: 20 April 1852; London
- Died: 3 April 1928 (aged 75); Fairfield, Goring
- Other names: Mister Strahan
- Education: Eton and St John's College Cambridge
- Occupation: Geologist
- Years active: 1875–1920
- Employer: Geological Survey
- Notable work: Geological surveying of the South Wales coalfields
- Title: Fellow of the Royal Society
- Awards: Wollaston Medal

Sir Aubrey Strahan KBE FRS (20 April 1852 – 4 March 1928) was a British geologist. He was elected a Fellow of the Royal Society (FRS) in 1903. He was Director of the Geological Survey of Great Britain from 1914–1920. He won the Wollaston Medal of the Geological Society of London in 1919.

== Personal life ==
Aubrey Strahan was born on 20 April 1852 in London. He was the fifth son of William Strahan and Anne Dorothea Strahan. He was raised at Blackmore Hall, near Sidmouth, until he went to Eton at the age of 13. He then went to St John's College, Cambridge (his father's college) in 1870. In May 1875 (the year of his graduation) he was employed in a temporary capacity by the Geological Survey, then headed by Andrew Ramsay, as an assistant geologist. He was to remain with the Survey for the rest of his professional life.

He married Fannie Roscoe in 1886. At this time he was mostly working in the south of England, but in 1901 became District Geologist with responsibility for South Wales. He was elected Fellow of the Royal Society in 1903, became President of the Geology Section of the British Association in 1904, and was President of the Geological Society of London in 1913 and 1914. He was Director of the Survey from 1914 until his retirement in 1920. He lived in Goring-on-Thames until his death there in 1928.

== Works ==
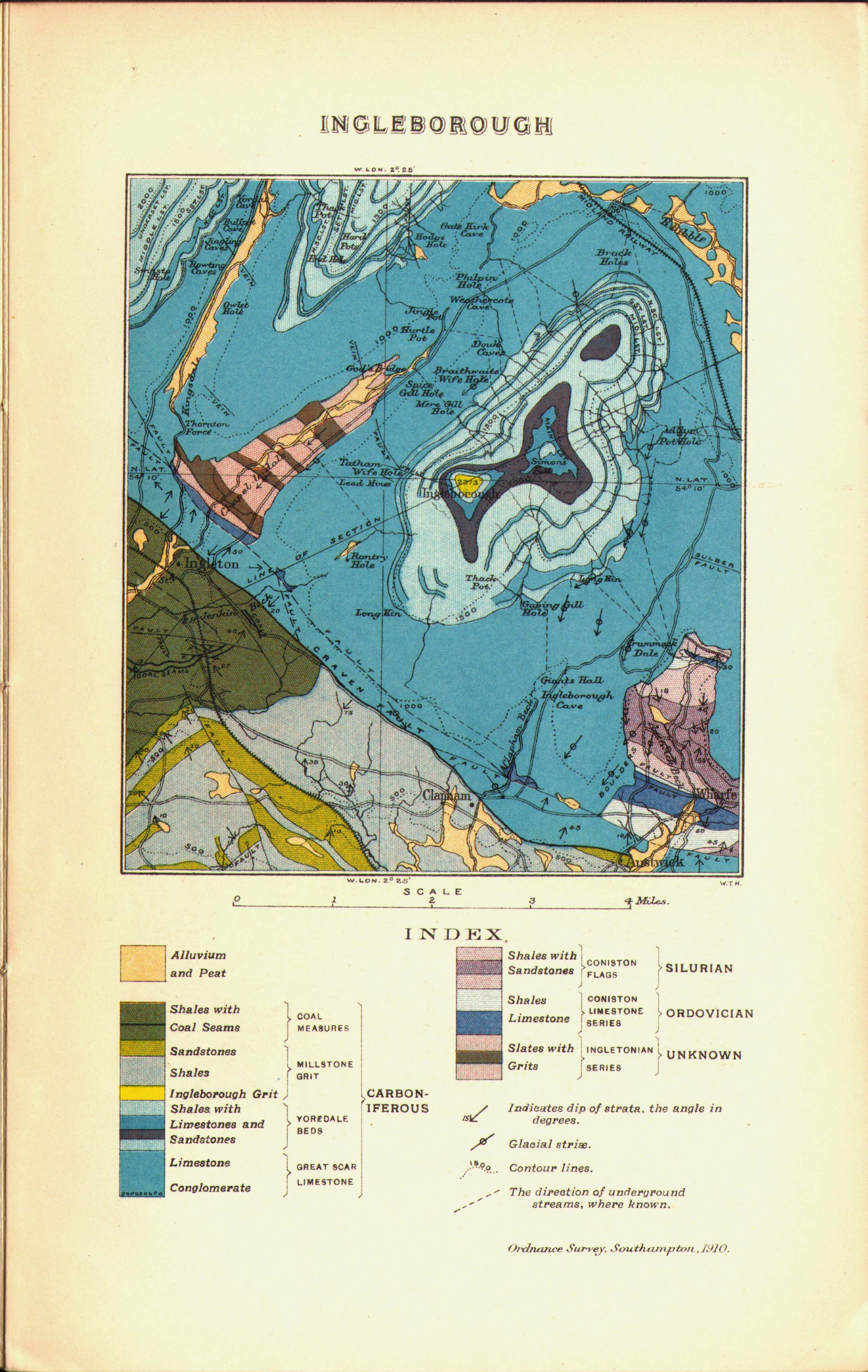
Geological map of Ingleborough and district, in North Yorkshire, showing the great scar limestone to the NE of the Craven fault, and the coal measures to the SW. From Strahan (1910)

During his long career Strahan contributed to over 30 memoirs of the Geological Survey, these mostly being detailed descriptions and explanations of the areas covered by individual sheets of the Geological Map. He also published many papers in academic journals. The work for which he is best known is the extensive series of surveys of the South Wales coalfield. He was always attracted by the economic aspects of the study of geology, and this is well-reflected in the coalfield work. He was known for the high quality of his mapping work.

His appointment as Director of the Survey coincided with the outbreak of the First World War, and he was responsible for adapting the survey to meet wartime needs. These included preparation of maps for the war zones (particularly relevant for areas of trench warfare); provision of staff, as geologists were needed in the field; and exploiting mineral resources for the raw materials and energy sources needed for war production. This work became the basis for a series of reports entitled Special Reports on the Mineral Resources of Great Britain, the first of which appeared in 1915

== Selected publications ==
- Ussher, W.A.E.; Jukes-Browne, A.J.; Strahan, Aubrey (1888). The geology of the country around Lincoln. (Explanation of sheet 83). Memoirs of the Geological Survey. London: His Majesty's Stationery Office (HMSO).
- Dakyns, J.R.; Tiddeman, R.H.; Gunn, W.; Strahan, Aubrey (1890). The geology of the country around Ingleborough, with parts of Wensleydale and Wharfedale. (Explanation of quarter-sheet 97 S. W., new series, sheet 50). Memoirs of the Geological Survey. London: His Majesty's Stationery Office (HMSO).
- Strahan, Aubrey; Walker, Alfred O. (1891). "On the Occurrence of Pebbles with Upper Ludlow Fossils in the Lower Carboniferous Conglomerates of North Wales". Quarterly Journal of the Geological Society of London. 35 (1–4): 268–274. doi:10.1144/GSL.JGS.1879.035.01-04.13. S2CID 128490420.
- Strahan, Aubrey (1891). The geology of the neighbourhoods of Flint, Mold, and Ruthin. (Explanation of quarter-sheet 79 S.E.). Memoirs of the Geological Survey. London: His Majesty's Stationery Office (HMSO).
- Dakyns, J.R.; Tiddeman, R.H.; Russell, R.; Clough, C.T.; Strahan, Aubrey (1891). The geology of the country around Mallerstang, with parts of Wensleydale, Swaledale, and Arkendale. (Explanation of quarter-sheet 97 N. W., new series, sheet 40). Memoirs of the Geological Survey. London: His Majesty's Stationery Office (HMSO).
- Strahan, Aubrey (1895). The geology of the coasts adjoining Rhyl, Abergele, and Colwyn, (explanation of quarter-sheet 79 N. W.). Memoirs of the Geological Survey. London: His Majesty's Stationery Office (HMSO).
- Strahan, Aubrey (1898). The Geology of the Isle of Purbeck and Weymouth. Memoirs of the Geological Survey. London: His Majesty's Stationery Office (HMSO).
- Strahan, Aubrey (1902). "On the Origin of the River-System of South Wales, and its Connection with that of the Severn and the Thames". Quarterly Journal of the Geological Society of London. 58 (1–4): 207–225. Bibcode:1902QJGS...58..207S. doi:10.1144/gsl.jgs.1902.058.01-04.16. S2CID 140196029.
- Strahan, Aubrey; Gibson, Walcot; Cantrill, T. C. (1904). The geology of the South Wales coal-field. Part V The country around Merthyr Tydfil. Being an account of the area comprised in sheet 231 of the map. Memoirs of the Geological Survey. London: His Majesty's Stationery Office (HMSO).
- Strahan, Aubrey; Cantrill, T. C. (1904). The geology of the South Wales coal-field. Part VI The country around Bridgend. Being an account of the area comprised in sheets 261, 262 of the map. Memoirs of the Geological Survey. London: His Majesty's Stationery Office (HMSO).
- Strahan, Aubrey; Pollard, William (1908). The Coals of South Wales: With Special Reference to the Origin and Distribution of Anthracite. Memoirs of the Geological Survey. London: His Majesty's Stationery Office (HMSO).
- Strahan, Aubrey (1910). Guide to the Geological Model of Ingleborough and District. Memoirs of the Geological Survey. London: His Majesty's Stationery Office (HMSO).
- Strahan, Aubrey (1916). On the thicknesses of strata in the counties of England and Wales, exclusive of rocks older than the Permian. Memoirs of the Geological Survey. London: His Majesty's Stationery Office (HMSO).
- Strahan, Aubrey (1917). "Geology at the Seat of War". Geological Magazine. 4 (2): 68–74. Bibcode:1917GeoM....4...68S. doi:10.1017/s0016756800135976. S2CID 128833600.
