= Cuchlaine King =

British geomorphologist (1922–2019)

- Born: Cuchlaine Audrey Muriel King; 26 June 1922
- Died: 17 December 2019 (aged 97)
- Education: Cambridge University
- Occupation: geomorphologist

Cuchlaine Audrey Muriel King (26 June 1922 – 17 December 2019) was a British geomorphologist known for her work in glaciology and her extensive writings on the geography of coasts and beaches. She, with John P Cole, was one of the first to produce a book on quantitative methods in geography.

== Early life and education ==
Born into an educated family, her father was the geologist W.B.R. King. She studied at Cambridge University and earned her bachelor's degree in geography in 1942. She then joined the Women's Royal Naval Service and became a meteorologist and surveyor for the duration of World War II. After her service, she returned to Cambridge and researched sand movement on beaches, earning her doctorate in 1949.

== Career and research ==
King spent her career studying the influence of glaciers on landscape evolution, an offshoot of her doctoral work, which continued throughout her career. She went on expeditions to Skaftafell in Iceland in 1953 and 1954 to study the glaciers there. It was unusual at that time for young women to be allowed to participate in fieldwork in such remote, rudimentary areas of Iceland. The expeditions resulted in a series of papers in 1955 and 1956. Because of her gender, her participation in fieldwork trips was discouraged. However, she participated in research on Baffin Island in the 1960s and the Austerdalsbreen glacier in Norway, and led fieldwork expeditions of her own throughout the Arctic. She published several books throughout her career, including 1973s Beaches and Coasts, the first book published to offer an overview of coastal geomorphology.

In 1959, King began teaching at the University of Nottingham, where she remained for the rest of her career. Whilst at Nottingham she was a Secretary of the University's Women's Staff Society. She became a professor in 1969, after several delays in her promotion due to discrimination. King was one of the earliest women to become a professor of geography in the United Kingdom, and she retired in 1982.

Cuchlaine King was honoured with the David Linton Award of the British Society for Geomorphology in 1991.

== Legacy ==
The University of Nottingham has named geography laboratories in King's honour.

== Publications ==
- Beaches and Coasts (1960)
- Quantitative Geography, J.P. Cole and C.A.M. King, London: John Wiley (1968)
- Techniques in geomorphology C.A.M. King, London: Arnold (1966)
- Physical Geography Cuchlaine A.M.King, London: Blackwell (1980)
- Glacial and Periglacial Geomorphology C. Embleton and C.A.M. King: Arnold (1968)
- Glacial Geomorphology C. Embleton and C.A.M. King: Halsted Press (1975)
