= W. B. R. King =

British geologist (1889–1963)

Professor W.B.R. King DSc, OBE, MC, FRS
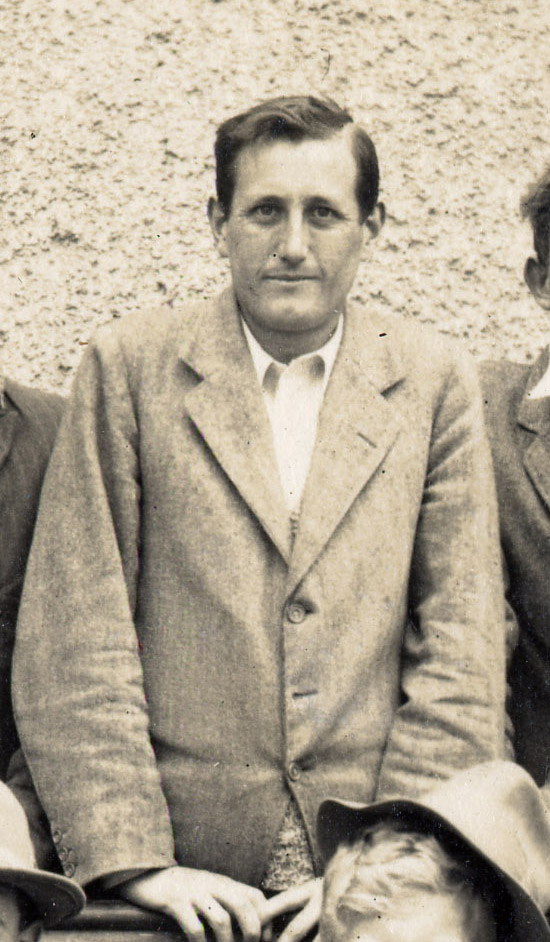
- William King, Edinburgh 1925
- Born: William Bernard Robinson King; 12 November 1889; West Burton, North Yorkshire
- Died: 23 January 1963 (aged 73); Friarage Hospital, Northallerton
- Education: Jesus College, Cambridge
- Children: Cuchlaine King
- Awards: Murchison Medal (1951); Fellow of the Royal Society
- Scientific career
- Workplaces: University of Cambridge; British Geological Survey

William Bernard Robinson King (12 November 1889 – 23 January 1963) was a British geologist.

== Early life and education ==
King was born on 12 November 1889 at West Burton, near Aysgarth, Yorkshire, the younger son of William Robinson King (1854–1921), solicitor, and his wife, Florence Muriel, née Theed (1865–1943).

He was educated at Houfe's school in Aysgarth and then at Uppingham School, Rutland. In 1908 he followed his father and elder brother to Jesus College, Cambridge. He graduated with a first-class honours degree in part two (geology) of the natural sciences tripos in 1912 and won the Harkness scholarship.

== Career ==
He joined the British Geological Survey in 1912 (then called the Geological Survey of Great Britain) and distinguished himself on field studies in Wales. He was largely engaged on the mapping of Millstone Grit, Coal Measures, Triassic and Pleistocene before mapping Ordovician and Silurian rocks.

In 1914 he was commissioned as a second-lieutenant in the Seventh Battalion of the Royal Welsh Fusiliers and in April 1915 was appointed to the War Office. In June 1915, he was transferred to France to serve as Geological Advisor to the Chief Engineer of the British Expeditionary Force to establish potable water supplies from boreholes. He has been called "the first British military hydrogeologist".

In 1916 King was joined by Major Tannatt William Edgeworth David, Professor of Geology at the University of Sydney. David's work was largely concerned with the mining and dug-outs but the two geologists frequently went out together when any field work was to be done.

King drew on his geological training to identify the source of aggregate present in the concrete used by the Germans to build their pillboxes. This work provided the key evidence to demonstrate that Dutch neutrality was being compromised. Writing to Peter Aubrey Sabine in 1961, King explained that: "The point, of course, was that the Germans were sending gravel from the Rhine thro’ neutral Dutch waterways and we claimed that it was being used for war purposes and the Germans said that they would never do such a wicked thing and it was used for peaceful purposes only.".

The most senior of the three military geologists at the start of World War II, Major King was sent to France in 1939 where he later advised on suitable sites for airfields and the D-Day landings. He pointed out that the region best geologically suited for rapid construction of Allied airfield was that of Normandy.

King was released from the army in 1943, but his role was taken up by Captain (later Major) Frederick William Shotton (1906–1990) after his return from North Africa.

In 1943 he became the 11th Woodwardian Professor of Geology at the University of Cambridge succeeding O.T Jones.

== Awards ==
William King was awarded an OBE (military division) in 1919 for his geology work during the First World War. He was awarded the Military Cross in 1940 for convoying high explosives from Boulogne to Baillieu and Cassel.

King's war work was widely recognized in France with honorary degrees and the Prestwich medal of the Geological Society of France in 1945.

King was elected a Fellow of the Royal Society in 1949. His candidacy document read

Woodwardian Professor of Geology; during two wars field-geologist R. E. serving with the British Army. As stratigrapher has mapped and worked out the Upper Ordovician Shelly succession through Sedgwicks classic ground along the Welsh Borderland and in Ribblesdale. As Palaeontologist has described new trilobites and correlated Cambrian faunas from Iran and The Salt Range. A co-worker with Marr on Cambridgeshire gravels has successfully applied the Abbe Breuil's Somme Valley flint-implement typology in England. And presented an acceptable synthesis of the Pleistocene succession in the valley of the Lower Thames. His war-time responsibilities included (1) underground hydrography for emergency water-supplies in France, (2) surface and sub-soil hydrology for selection of airfield sites in France and Belgium, and (3) "D Day" beach intelligence.

== Family ==
King married Margaret Amy Passingham (1885–1972) at Eastnor, Herefordshire. They had 2 daughters, Margaret and Cuchlaine King, a geomorphologist.

Lieutenant Colonel Professor W.B.R. King DSc, FRS, MC, OBE retired as Woodwardian Professor in 1955 and died in 1963.

== Resources ==
Archive

There are 8 boxes of records at Sedgwick Museum of Earth Sciences. The collection contains notebooks from World War II concerning water boreholes, rolls of maps, lantern plates marked "Channel", typed manuscripts, a presentation copy of "Work of Royal Engineers in the European War 1914-1919, Geological Work on the western Front 1922", handwritten notes on the retreat to Dunkirk, reports on specimens, dress medals, OBE and Military Cross; a silver cigarette case from colleagues at the Geological Survey 1916, certificates of honorary degrees and awards and a photograph album mostly relating to Sedgwick Club geological excursions.

The archive was catalogued by Dr Colin Forbes, a former curator of the Sedgwick Museum in 2014.

Academic offices
Preceded by Owen Thomas Jones	Woodwardian Professor of Geology, University of Cambridge; 1943-1955	Succeeded by Oliver Bulman
