= Conyers Middleton =

English clergyman and writer (1683–1750)

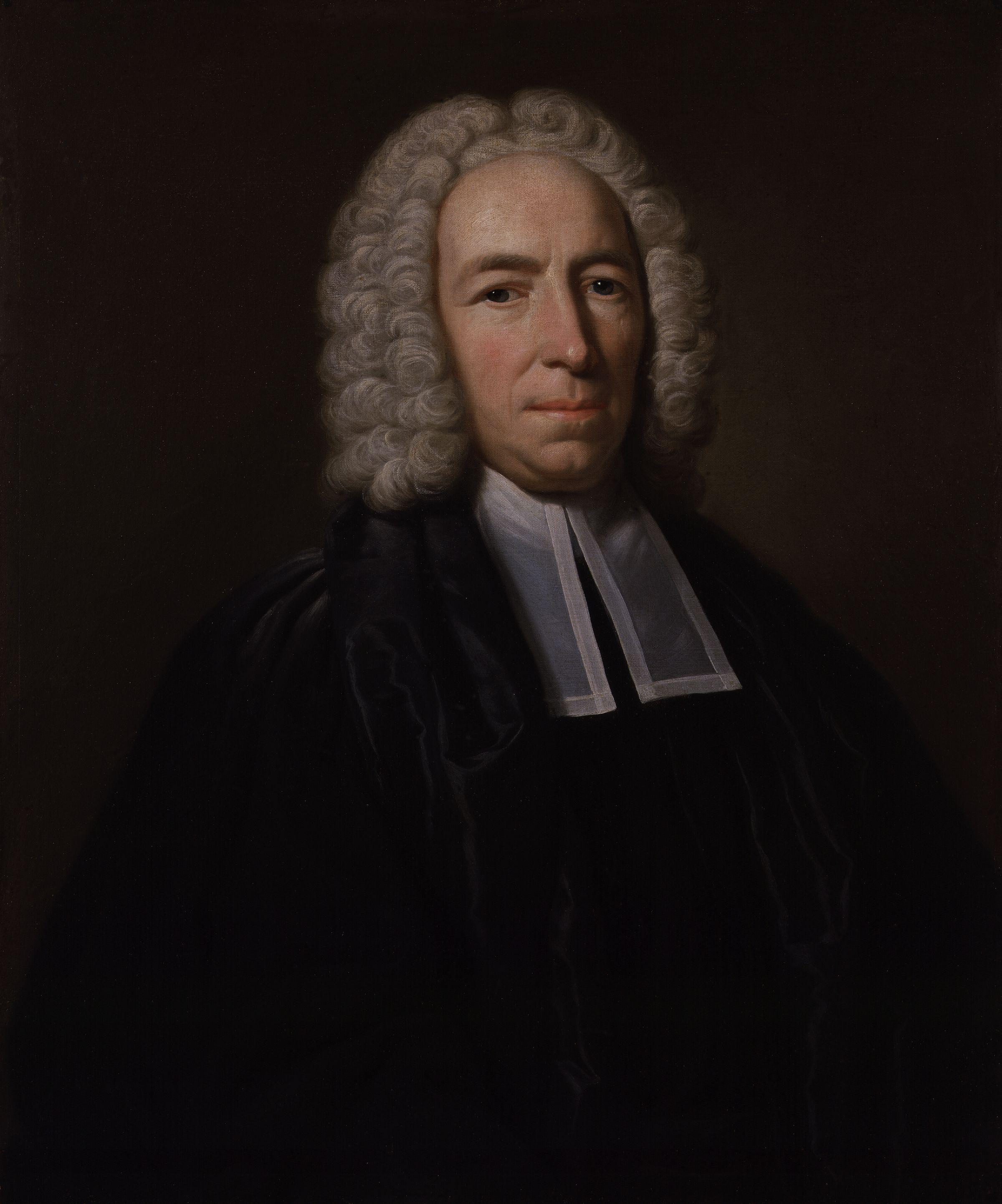
- Portrait by John Giles Eccardt, 1746
- Born: 27 December 1683; Richmond, England, U.K.
- Died: 28 July 1750 (aged 66); Hildersham, England, U.K.
- Resting place: St Michael's Church, Cambridge
- Education: St Peter's School
- Alma mater: Trinity College, Cambridge (BA, MA)
- Occupations: Clergyman and author
- Notable work: Life of Cicero (1741), A Free Inquiry into the Miraculous Powers (1749)
- Spouses: Sarah Drake (1711–1731, her death); Mary Place (1734–1745, her death); Anne Wilkins (1747–1752, his death)

Conyers Middleton (27 December 1683 – 28 July 1750) was an English clergyman. Though mired in controversy and disputes, he was also considered one of the best stylists in English of his time.

== Early life ==
Middleton was born at Richmond, North Yorkshire, in 1683. His mother, Barbara Place (died 1700), was the second wife of William Middleton (c.1646–1714), the rector of Hinderwell. Conyers Middleton had two brothers and a half-brother.

Middleton was educated at St Peter's School in York, before entering Trinity College of the University of Cambridge in March 1699. He graduated with a Bachelor of Arts (BA) in 1703. He was elected a fellow of the college in 1705 and took his Master of Arts (MA) in 1706. In 1707 he was ordained a deacon, and a priest in 1708.

In 1710 Dr. Middleton married Sarah Morris, the daughter of Thomas Morris (died 1717) of Mount Morris, Monks Horton, Hythe, Kent, and widow of Councillor and recorder Robert Drake of Cambridge (died 1702), of the family Drake of Ash. In due course Elizabeth Montagu (1718-1800) became a step-grand-daughter.

== Dispute with Bentley ==
Middleton was one of the thirty fellows of Trinity College who on 6 February 1710 petitioned the Bishop of Ely, as visitor of the college, to take steps against Richard Bentley the Master, at odds with the fellowship. In 1717, he became involved in a dispute with Bentley over the awarding of degrees. George I visited the university, and the degree of Doctor of Divinity was conferred on 32 people, including Middleton. Bentley, as regius professor of divinity, demanded a fee of four guineas from each of the new doctors in addition to the established complimentary "broad-piece". Middleton, after some dispute, consented to pay, taking Bentley's written promise to return the money if the claim should be finally disallowed. He was then created doctor. Having vainly applied for a return of the fee, he sued for it as a debt in the vice-chancellor's court. After various delays and attempts to make up the quarrel, the vice-chancellor issued a decree (23 September 1718) for Bentley's arrest. Bentley's refusal to submit to this decree led to further proceedings, and to his degradation from all his degrees by a grace of the senate on 18 October.

The matter was then pursued in a pamphlet war and Bentley brought an action against the publisher of the anonymous On the Present State of Trinity College (1719), which was the work of Middleton with John Colbatch. Middleton claimed (9 February 1720) the pamphlet as his own; Bentley continued to prosecute the bookseller, until Middleton made a declaration of his authorship before witnesses. Bentley then laid an information against him in the King's Bench, based on a passage in the pamphlet about the impossibility of obtaining redress in "any proper court of justice in the kingdom". The proceedings were slow, and meanwhile Middleton took advantage of Bentley's proposals for an edition of the New Testament to attack him in a sharp pamphlet. Bentley replied, using terms of gross abuse directed mainly against Colbatch, to whom he chose to attribute the authorship. Bentley's reply was condemned by the Cambridge heads of houses. Colbatch brought an action against him, and Middleton wrote a longer and more temperate rejoinder (possibly helped by Charles Ashton).

When Middleton's case was heard in the court of king's bench (Trinity term 1721), he was found guilty of libel. Sentence was delayed. Friends subscribed towards his expenses, and he obtained the intercession of a highly placed person for a lenient sentence. The chief justice John Pratt advised the two doctors to avoid scandal by a compromise, and Bentley finally accepted an apology. Middleton, however, had to pay his own costs, and expenses of his opponent.

The dispute flared up again, to end on a note of bathos. Middleton's supporters (14 December 1721), passed a vote through the university Senate making him a librarian—a salaried "Protobibliothecarius" of the university library—a new post, on the pretext of the king's recent donation of Bishop John Moore's library. Middleton in 1723 published a plan for the future arrangement of the books; but with swipes at Bentley for retaining some manuscripts (the priceless Codex Bezae among them) in his own house, and on the court of king's bench. Bentley appealed to the court, and on 20 June 1723 Middleton was fined, and ordered to provide securities for good behaviour for a year. Middleton went off to Italy. On his return he renewed his old suit for the four guineas. Bentley did not oppose him, and in February 1726 Middleton at last got back his fee, together with 12s. costs.

== Later life ==
Middleton stayed in Rome during a great part of 1724 and 1725. Henry Hare, 3rd Baron Coleraine, a fellow collector, was his companion on this journey. Middleton made a collection of antiquities, of which he later published a description; he sold it to Horace Walpole in 1744.

His first wife, Sarah Morris, died on 19 February 1731. In 1731 Middleton was appointed first Woodwardian Professor of Geology, and delivered an inaugural address in Latin, pointing out the benefits which might be expected from a study of fossils in confirming the history of Noah's Flood. He resigned the chair in 1734, on his second marriage.

Middleton's sceptical tendency became clearer, and Zachary Pearce accused him of covert infidelity. He was threatened with a loss of his Cambridge degrees. Middleton replied in two pamphlets, making such explanations as he could. In 1733, however, an anonymous pamphlet (by Philip Williams the public orator) declared that his books ought to be burnt and he should be banished from the university, unless he made a recantation. Middleton made an explanation in a final pamphlet, but for some time remained silent on theological topics. His relationship with Edward Harley, 2nd Earl of Oxford, was damaged.

Middleton's major work, his Life of Cicero (1741), was a success. He was attacked by Samuel Parr in 1787, however, for knowing plagiarism: Parr claimed it was based on De tribus luminibus Romanorum, a scarce work by William Bellenden. Middleton's second wife Mary died in 1745, and he returned to controversial theology in 1747. He looked for ecclesiastical preferment, but was unpopular with the bishops.

Middleton lived at Hildersham, near Cambridge, and married again shortly before he died, on 28 July 1750.

== Works ==
A modern opinion is that

Middleton stood out as an especially lethal species of the polemical divine. At best sarcastic and withering, at worst poisonous and unfair, Middleton justly deserved his reputation [...].

On the other hand, Alexander Pope thought he and Nathaniel Hooke were the only prose writers of the day who deserved to be cited as authorities on the language. Samuel Parr, while exposing Middleton's plagiarisms, praised his style. An edition of his works, containing several posthumous tracts, but not including the Life of Cicero, appeared in four volumes in 1752, and in five volumes in 1755.

=== Early works ===
The pamphlets from the struggle with Bentley were:

- A full and impartial Account of all the late Proceedings … against Dr. Bentley, 1719.
- Second Part of the above, 1719.
- Some Remarks upon a Pamphlet entitled “The Case of Dr. Bentley further stated and vindicated” …, 1719.
- A True Account of the Present State of Trinity College in Cambridge under the oppressive rule of their Master, Richard Bentley, late D.D., 1720.
- Remarks, paragraph by paragraph, upon the Proposals lately published by Richard Bentley for a new Edition of the Greek Testament and Latin Version, 1721.
- Some further Remarks … containing a full Answer to the Editor's late Defence …, 1721.
- Bibliothecæ Cantabrigiensis ordinandæ Methodus quædam …, 1723.

Middleton visited Italy, and drew conclusions on the pagan origin of Christian church ceremonies and beliefs; he subsequently published these in his Letter from Rome, showing an Exact Conformity between Popery and Paganism (1729). This work led to an attack from the Catholic side by Richard Challoner, in the preface to The Catholic Christian instructed in the Sacraments, Sacrifice and Ceremonies of the Church (1737); Challoner in particular accused Middleton of misrepresenting the articles of the Tridentine Creed that applied to saints and images. Middleton retaliated through the legal system, and Challoner in 1738 left for Douai. Thomas Seward wrote further on the subject in a 1746 "sequel" to Middleton and Henry Mower (i.e. More).

=== Controversy with the medical profession ===
In 1726, prompted by the Harveian Oration by Richard Mead, with an appendix by Edmund Chishull, Middleton offended the medical profession with a dissertation contending that the healing art among the ancients was exercised only by slaves or freedmen. He was answered by John Ward, Joseph Letherland, and others, to whom Middleton replied. Middleton let the matter drop after meeting Mead socially; but two related works, an Appendix seu Definitiones, pars secunda and a letter from Middleton to another opponent, Charles La Motte, were later published in 1761 by William Heberden the elder.

=== Deistic controversy ===
Middleton had remonstrated with Daniel Waterland when the latter replied to Matthew Tindal's Christianity as Old as the Creation. Middleton took a line which exposed him to the reproach of infidelity. In professing to indicate a short and easy method of confuting Tindal, he laid emphasis on the indispensableness of Christianity as a mainstay of social order. This brought him into conflict with those who held the same views as Waterland. Middleton was attacked from many quarters, and produced several apologetic pamphlets. His letter to Waterland from Rome, however, hinted that Middleton himself was active in Deism. Middleton wrote "Deity can be conceived to interpose himself; the universal good and salvation of man."

=== Classical scholarship ===
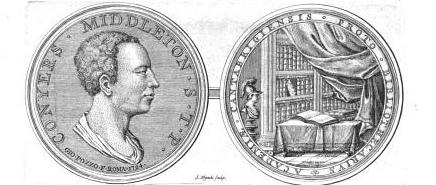
Engraving from Middleton's Germana quaedam antiquitatis eruditae monumenta (1745), showing a 1724 medal of Middleton by Giovanni Pozzo.

His Life of Cicero (1741) was largely told in the words of the writings of Cicero. Middleton's reputation was enhanced by this work; but, as was later pointed out, he drew largely from a rare book by William Bellenden, De tribus luminibus Romanorum. The work was undertaken at the request of John Hervey, 2nd Baron Hervey; from their correspondence came the idea for The Roman Senate, published in 1747.

=== Middletonian controversy on miraculous powers ===
The years 1747–8 produced Middleton's most significant theological writings. The Introductory Discourse and the Free Inquiry addressed "the miraculous powers which are supposed to have subsisted in the church from the earliest ages." Middleton suggested two propositions: that ecclesiastical miracles must be accepted or rejected in the mass; and that there is a distinction between the authority due to the early Church Fathers' testimony to the beliefs and practices of their times, and their credibility as witnesses to matters of fact. In 1750, he attacked Thomas Sherlock's notions of antediluvian prophecy, which had been published 25 years before. Among those who answered, or defended Sherlock, were: Thomas Ashton; Julius Bate; Anselm Bayly; Zachary Brooke; Thomas Church; Joseph Clarke; William Cooke; William Dodwell; Ralph Heathcote; John Jackson; Laurence Jackson; John Rotheram; Thomas Rutherforth; and Thomas Secker. Methodist founder John Wesley wrote an extensive response to Middleton recording his disagreement with him in January 1749.

Reflections on the variations, or inconsistencies, which are found among the four Evangelists was posthumous, published in 1752.

== Family ==
Although Middleton died childless, he married three times.

- firstly, in 1710, to Sarah Drake, the widow of Counsellor Drake of Cambridge, and daughter of Mr. Morris of Oak Morris in Kent;
- secondly, in 1734, to his cousin Mary, daughter of the Rev. Conyers Place of Dorchester, who died 26 April 1745, aged 38;
- thirdly, at the end of his life, to Anne, daughter of John Powell of Boughrood, in Radnorshire, who had lived as a companion to Mrs. Trenchard, widow of John Trenchard, later married to Thomas Gordon.

Elizabeth Montagu was a granddaughter of Sarah Drake, and she spent much time as a child with the Middletons in Cambridge, as did her sister Sarah Scott.

== Notes ==
Attribution

This article incorporates text from a publication now in the public domain: "Middleton, Conyers". Dictionary of National Biography. London: Smith, Elder & Co. 1885–1900.

Academic offices
Preceded by Establishment of the Chair by the bequest of John Woodward (1665 – 1728)	Woodwardian Professor of Geology, University of Cambridge; 1731-1734	Succeeded by Charles Mason
