= John Michell =

English natural philosopher and clergyman (1724–1793)

John Michell FRS
- Born: 25 December 1724; Eakring, Nottinghamshire, England
- Died: 21 April 1793 (aged 68); Thornhill, Yorkshire, England
- Education: Queens' College, Cambridge
- Known for: Predicting the existence of black holes, seismology, manufacture of magnets, mass of the Earth
- Spouses: Sarah Williamson (m. 1764; died 1765) Ann Brecknock (m. 1773)
- Scientific career
- Fields: Physics, geology

John Michell (/ˈmɪtʃəl/; 25 December 1724 – 21 April 1793) was an English natural philosopher and clergyman who provided pioneering insights into a wide range of scientific fields including astronomy, geology, optics, and gravitation. He was the first to have proposed the existence of stellar bodies comparable to black holes, and was the first to apply statistics to astronomy, providing the earliest evidence for the physical nature of double stars and star clusters.

He was first to have suggested that earthquakes travelled in (seismic) waves and the first to have measured the velocity of an earthquake, that being the 1755 Lisbon earthquake. Michell further invented an apparatus to measure the mass of the Earth that was later used by Henry Cavendish to measure the gravitational constant. He also explained how to manufacture an artificial magnet and provided the first accurate and comprehensive statement of the law of magnetic force. As a result, he has been called the father of both seismology and of magnetometry.

Michell served as the Woodwardian Professor of Geology at the University of Cambridge starting in 1762. He was elected a Fellow of the Royal Society in 1760.

== Early life, education and professional positions ==
John Michell was born in 1724 in Eakring, in Nottinghamshire, the son of Gilbert Michell, a priest, and Obedience Gerrard. Gilbert was the son of William Michell and Mary Taylor of Kenwyn, Cornwall; Obedience was the daughter of Ralph and Hannah Gerrard of London. He was educated at Queens' College, Cambridge, and later became a Fellow of Queens'. The family was of Cornish origins. He obtained his M.A. degree in 1752, and his B.D. degree in 1761. He was Tutor of the college from 1751 to 1763; Praelector in Arithmetic in 1751; Censor in Theology in 1752; Praelector in Geometry in 1753; Praelector in Greek in 1755 and 1759; Senior Bursar in 1756; Praelector in Hebrew in 1759 and 1762; Censor in Philosophy and Examiner in 1760. "He was nominated Rector of St Botolph's, Cambridge, on 28 March 1760, and held this living until June 1763." From 1762 to 1764, he held the Woodwardian Chair of Geology until he was obliged to relinquish it on his marriage.

There is no surviving portrait of Michell; he is said to have been "a little short Man, of a black Complexion, and fat but having no Acquaintance with him, can say little of him. I think he had the care of St. Botolph's Church Cambridge, while he continued Fellow of Queens’ College, where he was esteemed a very ingenious Man, and an excellent Philosopher. He has published some things in that way, on the Magnet and Electricity."

In 1910, Sir Edmund Whittaker observed that during the century after Isaac Newton's death, "the only natural philosopher of distinction who lived and taught at Cambridge was Michell", although his "researches seem to have attracted little or no attention among his collegiate contemporaries and successors, who silently acquiesced when his discoveries were attributed to others, and allowed his name to perish entirely from Cambridge tradition". Michell proceeded to take up clerical positions in Compton and then Havant, both in Hampshire. During this period he unsuccessfully sought positions at Cambridge, and as Astronomer Royal.

In 1767, he was appointed rector of St. Michael's Church of Thornhill, near Leeds, Yorkshire, England, a post he held for the rest of his life. He did most of his important scientific work in Thornhill, where he died on 21 April 1793, aged 68. He is buried there. After local pressure, a blue plaque went up on the church wall to commemorate him.

== Scientific work ==
In 1750, Michell published at Cambridge a work of some eighty pages entitled "A Treatise of Artificial Magnets", in which he presented an easy and expeditious method of producing magnets that are superior to the best natural magnets. Besides the description of the method of magnetization which still bears his name, this work contains a variety of accurate observations about magnetism, and features a lucid exposition of the nature of magnetic induction.

At one point, Michell attempted to measure the radiation pressure of light by focusing sunlight onto one side of a compass needle. The experiment was not a success: the needle melted.

=== Geology and seismology ===
Until the late 20th century Michell was considered important primarily because of his work on geology. His most important geological essay, written after the 1755 Lisbon earthquake, was entitled "Conjectures concerning the Cause and Observations upon the Phaenomena of Earthquakes" (Philosophical Transactions, li. 1760). In this paper he introduced the idea that earthquakes spread out as waves through the Earth, and that they involve the offsets in geological strata now known as faults. He was able to estimate both the epicentre and the focus of the Lisbon earthquake, and may also have been the first to suggest that a tsunami is caused by a submarine earthquake. He was the first to calculate the velocity of an earthquake.

Michell's essay not only provided insights on earthquakes but also, more broadly, represented an advance in the understanding of the geology of the Earth's crust. He recognized that the Earth is composed "of regular and uniform strata", some of which have been interrupted by upheavals. "The most important part of Michell's Earthquake paper", in the view of one commentator, "is the account which it contains of what is now known as 'the crust of the Earth.'" Exhibiting a remarkable knowledge of the geological strata in various parts of England and abroad, he drew on his own observations to advance the understanding of sedimentary stratigraphy and was the first to define the Mesozoic stratigraphy in the U.K.

In 1760, as a result of this work, he was elected a member of the Royal Society.

A 1788 letter to Henry Cavendish indicated that Michell continued to be interested in geology several decades after his paper on earthquakes.

=== Magnetism ===
Michell studied magnetism and discovered that the magnetic force exerted by each pole of a magnet decreases according to an inverse-square law, i.e. in proportion to the square of the distance between them. His 1750 paper Treatise of Artificial Magnets, which was written for seamen and instrument makers and intended as a practical manual on how to make magnets, included a list of the "Properties of Magnetical Bodies" that represented a major contribution to the understanding of magnetism. His paper provided the first accurate and comprehensive statement of the law of magnetic force.

=== Gravity ===
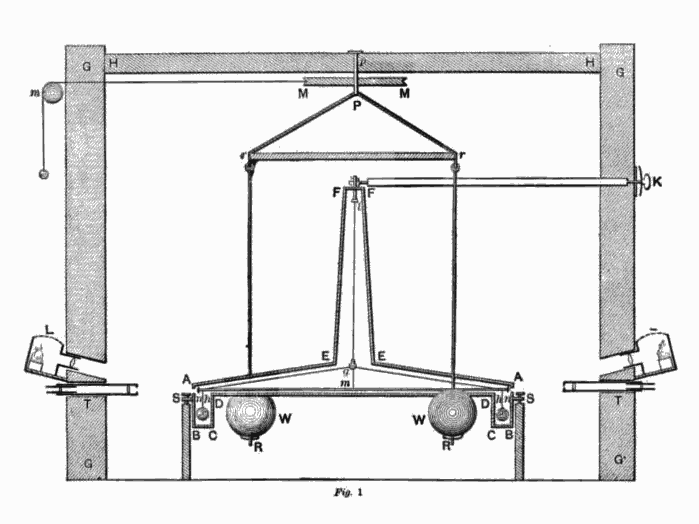
Michell's torsion balance, used in the Cavendish experiment

Michell devised a torsion balance for measuring the mass of the Earth, but died before he could use it. His instrument passed into the hands of his lifelong friend Henry Cavendish, who first performed in 1798 the experiment now known as the Cavendish Experiment. Placing two 1-kg lead balls at the ends of a six-foot rod, he suspended the rod horizontally by a fibre attached to its centre. Then he placed a massive lead ball beside each of the small ones, causing a gravitational attraction that led the rod to turn clockwise. By measuring the rod's movement, Cavendish was able to calculate the force exerted by each of the large balls on the 1-kg balls. From these calculations, he was able to provide an accurate estimate of the gravitational constant and of the mass and average density of the Earth. Cavendish gave Michell full credit for his accomplishment.

In 1987, gravity researcher A. H. Cook wrote:

The most important advance in experiments on gravitation and other delicate measurements was the introduction of the torsion balance by Michell and its use by Cavendish. It has been the basis of all the most significant experiments on gravitation ever since.

=== Double stars and variable stellar luminosity ===
Michell was the first person to apply the new mathematics of statistics to the study of the stars, and demonstrated in a 1767 paper that many more stars occur in pairs or groups than a perfectly random distribution could account for. He focused his investigation on the Pleiades cluster, and calculated that the likelihood of finding such a close grouping of stars was about one in half a million. He concluded that the stars in these double or multiple star systems might be drawn to one another by gravitational pull, thus providing the first evidence for the existence of binary stars and star clusters. His work on double stars may have influenced his friend William Herschel's research on the same topic.

Another consequence of Michell's statistical work was the realization that fixed luminosity for stars was a poor approximation. Hershel had developed a model of the Milky Way using this approximation and a large number of star directions. While the shape was correct, various appendages to the model were not. The variable luminosity meant the evidence for the edge of the galaxy was suspect and Hershel lost faith in his model.

=== Black holes ===
In a paper for the Philosophical Transactions of the Royal Society of London, read on 27 November 1783, Michell was the first to propose the existence of celestial bodies similar to black holes. Having accepted Newton's corpuscular theory of light, which posited that light consists of minuscule particles, he reasoned that such particles, when emanated by a star, would be slowed down by its gravitational pull, and that it might therefore be possible to determine the star's mass based on the reduction in speed. This insight led in turn to the recognition that a star's gravitational pull might be so strong that the escape velocity would exceed the speed of light. Michell calculated that this would be the case with a star more than 500 times the size of the Sun. Since light would not be able to escape such a star, it would be invisible. In his own words:

If there should really exist in nature any bodies, whose density is not less than that of the sun, and whose diameters are more than 500 times the diameter of the sun, since their light could not arrive at us; or if there should exist any other bodies of a somewhat smaller size, which are not naturally luminous; of the existence of bodies under either of these circumstances, we could have no information from sight; yet, if any other luminous bodies should happen to revolve about them we might still perhaps from the motions of these revolving bodies infer the existence of the central ones with some degree of probability, as this might afford a clue to some of the apparent irregularities of the revolving bodies, which would not be easily explicable on any other hypothesis; but as the consequences of such a supposition are very obvious, and the consideration of them somewhat beside my present purpose, I shall not prosecute them any further.

— John Michell, 1784

Michell suggested that there might be many such objects in the universe, and today astronomers believe that black holes do indeed exist at the centers of most galaxies. Similarly, Michell proposed that astronomers could detect them by looking for star systems which behaved gravitationally like two stars, but where only one star could be seen. Michell argued that this would show the presence of a star from which light was not escaping. It was an extraordinarily accurate prediction. All of the dozen candidate stellar black holes in our galaxy (the Milky Way) are in X-ray compact binary systems.

Michell's ideas about gravity and light interested William Herschel, who tried to test them with his powerful telescopes. A few years after Michell came up with the concept of invisible, light-trapping stars, the French mathematician Pierre-Simon Laplace suggested essentially the same idea in his 1796 book, Exposition du Système du Monde.

It has been written that Michell was so far ahead of his time in regard to black holes that the idea "made little impression" on his contemporaries. "He died in quiet obscurity", states the American Physical Society, "and his notion of a 'dark star' was forgotten until his writings re-surfaced in the 1970s."

=== Telescopes ===
Michell constructed telescopes for his own use. One of them, a reflecting telescope with a 10-foot focal length and a 30-inch aperture, was bought by the distinguished astronomer William Herschel after Michell's death. The two men had many interests in common, and exchanged letters at least twice, but only one record suggests that they ever met. Herschel recorded having visited and seen Michell's telescope while in the area in 1792; Michell was already frail, and his telescope was in disrepair. Herschel bought the telescope the following year, for £30.

== Other professional activities ==
Michell also wrote a paper on surveying that his biographer has described as "elegant" in theory. Michell was elected a member of the Royal Society. He was first invited to meetings of the Royal Society in 1751 as a guest of Sir George Savile, who would become his patron. He later attended meetings "one to four times a year", while at Cambridge. His paper on the cause of earthquakes was read before the Society beginning on 28 February 1760, leading to a recommendation by Savile and another member that Michell be invited to join the Society. He was elected a member on 12 June 1760. Michell followed his work in seismology with work in astronomy, and after publishing his findings in 1767 he served on an astronomical committee of the Royal Society.

More recently, Michell has become known for his letter to Cavendish, published in 1784, on the effect of gravity on light. This paper was rediscovered in the 1970s and is now recognised as anticipating several astronomical ideas that had been considered to be 20th century innovations. Michell is now credited with being the first to study the case of a heavenly object massive enough to prevent light from escaping (the concept of escape velocity was well known at the time). Such an object, often referred to as a dark star, would not be directly visible, but could be identified by the motions of a companion star if it was part of a binary system. The classical minimum radius for escape assuming light behaved like particles of matter is numerically equal to the Schwarzschild radius in general relativity. Michell also suggested using a prism to measure what is now known as gravitational redshift, the gravitational weakening of starlight due to the surface gravity of the source. Michell acknowledged that some of these ideas were not technically practical at the time, but wrote that he hoped they would be useful to future generations. By the time that Michell's paper was rediscovered nearly two centuries later, these ideas had been reinvented by others.

== Personal life ==
Michell was a man of "wide latitude in religious belief". He was described by a contemporary as "a little short man, of black complexion, and fat", and was "esteemed a very ingenious Man, and an excellent Philosopher." During his years at Thornhill, he welcomed visitors including Benjamin Franklin, Joseph Priestley, Jan Ingenhousz, and Henry Cavendish (the discoverer of hydrogen). Michell wrote to Franklin in 1767 describing his first visit to Thornhill, "the place I told you I was going to remove to".

Priestley lived in nearby Birstall for a time. It was at Michell's rectory opposite the church that Priestley and Ingenhousz met for the first time. At the same meeting John Smeaton was introduced to Benjamin Franklin and together they viewed the canal that Smeaton had just finished constructing nearby. Michell also helped Smeaton revise his book on the Eddystone Lighthouse.

Michell's first wife was Sarah Williamson (1727–1765), daughter of Luke Williamson and Sutton Holmes, "a young lady of considerable fortune", whom he married in 1764 and who unfortunately died only a year later, in 1765. On 13 February 1773, in Newark, Nottinghamshire, he married Ann Brecknock (1736–1805), daughter of Matthew and Ann Brecknock of Nottinghamshire. They had one child, Mary, who married Sir Thomas Turton of Leeds, son of William Turton Esq. of Kingston Lisle, Berkshire, and Jane Clarke of Hertford, Hertfordshire.

Michell's younger brother Gilbert was a merchant in London who later lived with Michell in Thornhill, where the two brothers were active in local real estate, purchasing many properties in the West Riding of Yorkshire.

== Legacy ==
=== Recognition ===
Michell has been called one of the "greatest unsung scientists of all time". The American Physical Society (APS) described him as being "so far ahead of his scientific contemporaries that his ideas languished in obscurity, until they were re-invented more than a century later". The Society stated that while "he was one of the most brilliant and original scientists of his time, Michell remains virtually unknown today, in part because he did little to develop and promote his own path-breaking ideas". According to another science journalist, "a few specifics of Michell's work really do sound like they are ripped from the pages of a twentieth century astronomy textbook."

Michell has been described as arguably having "the broadest competence of any British natural philosopher of the eighteenth century: equally skilled in experiment and observation, mathematical theory, and instruments, his field of inquiry was the universe."

== Biographies ==
Michell is the subject of the book Weighing the World: The Reverend John Michell of Thornhill (2012) by Russell McCormmach.

== Selected publications ==
- Observations on the Comet of January 1760 at Cambridge, Philosophical Transactions (1760)
- Conjectures Concerning the Cause and Observations upon the Phaenomena of Earthquakes, ibid. (1760)
- A Recommendation of Hadley's Quadrant for Surveying, ibid. (1765)
- Proposal of a Method for measuring Degrees of Longitude upon Parallels of the Equator, ibid. (1766)
- An Inquiry into the Probable Parallax and Magnitude of the Fixed Stars, ibid. (1767)
- On the Twinkling of the Fixed Stars, ibid. (1767)
- Michell, John (27 November 1783), "On the Means of Discovering the Distance, Magnitude, &c. of the Fixed Stars, in Consequence of the Diminution of the Velocity of Their Light, in Case Such a Diminution Should be Found to Take Place in any of Them, and Such Other Data Should be Procured from Observations, as Would be Farther Necessary for That Purpose. By the Rev. John Michell, B. D. F. R. S. In a Letter to Henry Cavendish, Esq. F. R. S. and A. S.", Philosophical Transactions of the Royal Society of London, 74, The Royal Society: 35–57, Bibcode:1784RSPT...74...35M, doi:10.1098/rstl.1784.0008, ISSN 0080-4614, JSTOR 106576

== Sources ==
- Eisenstaedt, Jean (1991). "De l'influence de la gravitation sur la propagation de la lumière en théorie newtonienne. L'archéologie des trous noirs". Archive for History of Exact Sciences. 42 (4): 315–386. Bibcode:1991AHES...42..315E. doi:10.1007/bf00375157. S2CID 121763556.
- Eisenstaedt, Jean, Avant Einstein Relativité, lumière, gravitation, Paris: Seuil (2005)
- Gibbons, Gary. "The man who invented black holes [his work emerges out of the dark after two centuries] (Archived)" (PDF). New Scientist: 1101.
- Hardin, Clyde R (1966). "The scientific work of the Reverend John Michell". Annals of Science. 22: 27–47. doi:10.1080/00033796600203015.
- Christa Jungnickel and Russell McCormmach, Cavendish, American Philosophical Society, Philadelphia, 1996, ISBN 0-87169-220-1.
- McCormack, Russell (1968). "John Michell and Henry Cavendish: Weighing the stars". British Journal for the History of Science. 4 (2): 126–155. Bibcode:1968BrJHS...4..126M. doi:10.1017/s0007087400003459. S2CID 144701609.
- Schaffer, Simon (1979). "John Michell and black holes". Journal for the History of Astronomy. 10: 42–43. Bibcode:1979JHA....10...42S. doi:10.1177/002182867901000104. S2CID 123958527.
- "Rev John Michell", FamilySearch

Academic offices
| Preceded by Charles Mason | Woodwardian Professor of Geology, University of Cambridge; 1762–1764 | Succeeded by Samuel Ogden |
