= John Cole (geographer) =

British geographer (1928–2020)

John Peter Cole (9 December 1928 – 1 April 2020) was a British geographer.

Cole was born in Sydney, Australia. He graduated from the University of Nottingham in 1950. He later returned there to join the staff of the Geography Department, rising to become professor of urban and regional geography. He was emeritus professor of geography at the university. From 1957 he wrote or co-authored over 25 books on geography, including Geography of World Affairs, first published in 1959. His work ran from school texts to academic papers, and he was an early adopter of computers in geographical studies. He was a visiting professor at the Universities of Washington, Columbia, Mexico, Valparaiso, Nanjing and Beijing. He retired in 1994.

He died at his home in Bramcote on 1 April 2020, aged 91. He had lived in this house since at least the 1970s, potentially longer. His wife was from Kansas. She moved back to the United States of America following his death.

== Bibliography ==
- Geography of World Affairs (1959, several later editions)
- Quantitative Geography: Techniques and Theories in Geography (with C. A. M. King) (1968)
- New Ways in Geography: A Guide for Teachers (with N. J. Beynon) (1969)
- Latin America: An Economic and Social Geography (1975)
- Situations in Human Geography: A Practical Approach (1978)
- Regional Inequality in Services and Purchasing Power in the USSR, 1940-1976 (with M. E. Harrison) (1978)
- Peru, 1940-2000: Performance and Prospects (with P. M. Mather) (1978)
- The Development Gap: A Spatial Analysis of World Poverty and Inequality (1981)
- Geography of the Soviet Union (1984)
- China 1950-2000: Performance and Prospects (1985)
- Development and Underdevelopment: A Profile of the Third World (1987)
- Modern Soviet Economic Performance (with Trevor Buck) (1987)
- Geography of the World's Major Regions (1996)
- A Geography of the European Union (with Francis Cole) (1997)
