= Marrite =

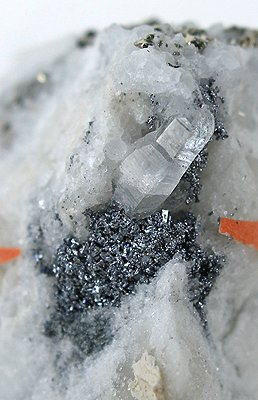
- The two arrows point to the marrite microcrystals (one or two at each arrow, dull), the rest is galena (bright)

General
- Category: Sulfosalt mineral
- Formula: PbAgAsS_{3}
- IMA symbol: Mrr
- Strunz classification: 2.JB.15
- Crystal system: Monoclinic
- Crystal class: Prismatic (2/m) (same H-M symbol)
- Space group: P2_{1}/a
- Unit cell: a = 7.29 Å, b = 12.68 Å, c = 5.99 Å; β = 91.22°; V = 553.57 Å^{3}; Z = 4

Identification
- Formula mass: 486.19 g/mol
- Color: Lead gray, steel gray
- Crystal habit: Tabular or striated crystals
- Twinning: Partly bent twin lamellae observable in polished section.
- Cleavage: None
- Fracture: Conchoidal
- Tenacity: Brittle
- Mohs scale hardness: 3
- Luster: Metallic
- Streak: Black with brownish tint
- Diaphaneity: Opaque
- Specific gravity: 5.82
- Optical properties: Biaxial
- Refractive index: Anistrophic
- Pleochroism: White, with red internal reflections.
- Other characteristics: Of hydrothermal origin along with other sulfosalts in dolomite.

Marrite (mar'-ite) is a mineral with the chemical formula PbAgAsS_{3}. It is the arsenic equivalent of freieslebenite (PbAgSbS_{3}), but also displays close polyhedral characteristics with sicherite and diaphorite. Marrite was first described in 1905, and was named in honor of geologist John Edward Marr (1857–1933) of Cambridge, England.

== Crystal habit ==
Marrite is part of the monoclinic crystal class, and ^{2}/_{m} point group. The symmetry reveals that this mineral is composed of 3 axes of unequal lengths. Two of the axes are perpendicular at 90 degrees, while one axis intersects at an angle less than 90 degrees. Crystal habit includes striated, meaning it forms parallel lines along crystal faces; or tabular, meaning that structure dimensions are thin in 1 direction.

== Optical mineralogy ==
Under a microscope, marrite has a distinct anisotropic refractive index, meaning the velocity of light varies depending on the direction being traveled through the mineral. It is typical of anisotropic minerals to display colorful, optical properties when viewed under cross polarized light. This differs from its vague gray color when viewed in plane polarized light, which is the reason optical mineralogy is essential for correctly identifying similar minerals. Marrite belongs to the biaxial optical class, which signifies that it has two optic axes. An optic axis is the direction of light that travels at 0 birefringence, causing the mineral to appear isotropic. When viewing the indicatrix of biaxial minerals, both optic axes are always perpendicular to one of the two circular sections.

== Occurrence ==
The only known occurrence of Marrite is the type locality of the Lengenbach quarry in Binntal, Valais, Switzerland. It is primarily formed because of hydrothermal activity, which involves water and high temperatures. Marrite is predominantly found in dolomite along with a variety of other sulfosalts.
