= John Rotheram =

English cleric

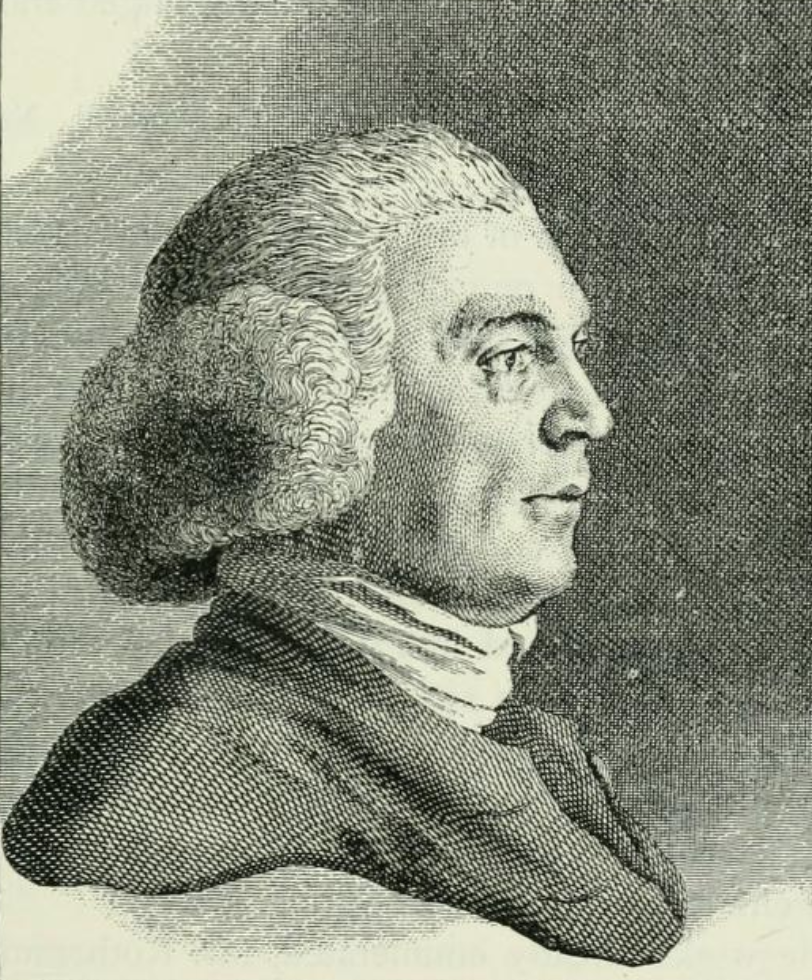
John Rotheram

John Rotheram (1725–1789) was an English cleric, known as a theological writer.

== Life ==
The second of the three sons of the Rev. William Rotherham (as the father spelt his name), who master of the free grammar school of Haydon Bridge, Northumberland, was born there on 22 June 1725, and was educated at his father's school. He entered The Queen's College, Oxford, as batler, on 21 February 1745, partly maintained by his elder brother, the Rev. Thomas Rotheram, professor in Codrington College in Barbados. He graduated B.A. in 1748–9, and then went to Barbados as tutor to the two sons of the Frere family, arriving in the island on 20 Jan. 1749–50. In 1751 he accepted the post of assistant in Codrington College. For his "services to religion" as a controversialist he was, though absent, created M.A. on 11 December 1753 by special decree of Oxford University. In 1757 he returned to England.

Rotheram accepted, on arriving in London, the curacy of Tottenham in Middlesex, and held it until 1766. From 1760 to 1767 he held a Percy fellowship at University College, Oxford, and he was also one of the preachers at the Royal Chapel, Whitehall. Richard Trevor, the bishop of Durham, gave him the rectory of Ryton, where he was from February 1766 to 1769. On 30 October 1769 he was appointed by Trevor to the rectory of Houghton-le-Spring, which he continued to hold until his death; and from 1778 to 1783, when he resigned the benefice in favour of his nephew Richard Wallis, he was vicar of Seaham. He was chaplain to Bishop Trevor, on whom he preached a funeral sermon at Newcastle on 27 July 1771, and to his successor as bishop; he was elected proctor in convocation in 1774, and he was a trustee of Nathaniel Crewe's charity.

Rotheram was struck by a stroke at Bamburgh Castle, when visiting Archdeacon John Sharp, and died there on 16 July 1789. His remains were laid near the grave of his brother, in the chancel of Houghton church, and a marble tablet was erected to his memory.

== Works ==
While living with the Frere family in Barbados, Rotheram wrote his first work: The Force of the Argument for the Truth of Christianity drawn from a Collective View of Prophecy, 1752, which was prompted by the controversy between Thomas Sherlock and Conyers Middleton concerning the place of prophecy in religion. From Codrington College he produced the larger volume: A Sketch of the One Great Argument, formed from the several concurring Evidences for the Truth of Christianity (1754 and 1763).

Besides single sermons, Rotheram published also:

- An Apology for the Athanasian Creed (anon.), 1760; 2nd edit. with his name in 1762. This was answered anonymously in 1773, probably by William Adams.
- An Essay on Faith and its Connection with Good Works, 1766 (4th edit. corrected, 1772; new edit. 1801), the substance of a course of sermons before the university of Oxford; the portion dealing with The Origin of Faith was published separately in 1761 and 1763.
- Three Sermons on Public Occasions before the University of Oxford, 1766, all previously published separately.
  - A sermon on the origin of faith. Preached before the University of Oxford, at St. Peter's, Oct. 28, 1761
  - The influence of religion on human laws. A sermon preached at St. Mary's in Oxford, at the Assizes. Thursday, March 3, 1763
  - Government a divine institution. A sermon preached before the University of Oxford at St. Mary's, on the twenty-ninth of May M.DCC. LXV
- An Essay on Establishments in Religion, with Remarks on the Confessional (anon.), 1767; reprinted in the Churchman Armed, 1814, i. 183–276, and answered by Caleb Fleming and others.
- An Essay on the Distinction between the Soul and Body of Man, 1781.
- An Essay on Human Liberty, 1782.

== Notes ==
Attribution

This article incorporates text from a publication now in the public domain: "Rotheram, John (1725-1789)". Dictionary of National Biography. London: Smith, Elder & Co. 1885–1900.
