= John Edward Marr =

British geologist

John Edward Marr FGS FRS
- Born: 14 June 1857; Poulton-le-Sands, England
- Died: 1 October 1933 (aged 76)
- Education: St John's College, Cambridge
- Known for: Work on the succession of palaezoic rocks Theoretical work on the Upper Silesian fossils found in Lower Silesian regions Succession of the Stockdale Shales
- Awards: Sedgwick Prize (1882); Lyell Medal (1900); Wollaston Medal (1914); Royal Medal (1930)
- Scientific career
- Fields: Geology
- Workplaces: University of Cambridge
- Academic advisors: Thomas George Bonney; T. McK. Hughes
- Notable students: Gertrude Elles

John Edward Marr (14 June 1857 – 1 October 1933) was a British geologist.

After studying at Lancaster Royal Grammar School, he matriculated to St John's College, Cambridge, graduating with First Class Honours in 1878. Following undergraduate work in the Lake District, he travelled to Bohemia to investigate the fossil collection of Joachim Barrande, where his work won him the Sedgwick Prize in 1882. In 1886, Marr became a lecturer at the University of Cambridge Department of Geology, a position he held for 32 years until he succeeded Thomas McKenny Hughes as Woodwardian Professor of Geology in 1917.

== Early life and education ==
Marr was born in Poulton-le-Sands on 14 June 1857 to John Marr, a retired silk merchant, and his wife Mary Simpson. After the family stayed in Caernarfon in 1863, Marr became interested in geology, having discovered a fossil which was named after him. From 1867 to 1875 he studied at the Lancaster Royal Grammar School, where he met R. H. Tiddeman, who took Marr on a number of field trips and geological surveys. In 1875, he matriculated to St John's College, Cambridge to study geology as an exhibitioner, having won a Foundation Scholarship. There he studied under Thomas George Bonney and Thomas McKenny Hughes, graduating with First Class Honours in 1878. As an undergraduate, he published several papers, including one on his discovery of Cambrian fossils in Caernarfonshire that could not be accurately dated, something that occupied a lot of his later work. He was also a member of the Sedgwick Club during his time at Cambridge. In 1879, he became a Fellow of the Geological Society of London, and in 1881 was elected a Fellow of St John's College.

== Research work and Later Life ==
After graduation, Marr used two research funds from the Worts Fund of Cambridge University to investigate the work done in Bohemia and Scandinavia to reorder the older palaeozoic rocks, his work in the Lake District having convinced him that it was possible to order the confusing succession of paleozoic rocks as it then stood. In 1879, he travelled to the collection of Joachim Barrande, who had found newer Upper Silesian fossils among older Lower Silesian ones and hypothesised that the two groups existed side by side. Marr instead proved that the younger fossils had "dropped" into the older rock as a result of faults in the stone. Barrande himself was not convinced, but Marr's work on recategorising the Silesian fossils won him the Sedgwick Prize in 1882.

Marr then returned to the Lake District, where he worked with Henry Alleyne Nicholson on the succession of the Stockdale Shales. He then worked with Alfred Harker on a similar project in Shap. In his Lake District work Marr came up with the idea of lag faulting to explain the topography of the District, subscribing much of the layout to glacial erosion. His theories were later published in a 1916 book The Geology of the Lake District.

Having retired as a professor in 1930, he died in Cambridge on 1 October 1933.

== Other work and awards ==
In 1886, Marr became University Lecturer in Geology at the University of Cambridge, a position he held for 32 years until he succeeded Thomas McKenny Hughes as Woodwardian Professor of Geology in 1917. He spent 13 years as Professor before retiring due to ill-health in 1930, followed by his death on 1 October 1933.The Marr Memorial Fund supports the "study of Geology in the field", with preference given to students of the department.

Marr served as Secretary of the Geological Society of London from 1888 to 1898, Vice-President and President from 1904 to 1906, serving on the council for 35 years and as Foreign Secretary for 3. The Society awarded him the Lyell Medal in 1900 and the Wollaston Medal in 1914. In 1891 he was made a Fellow of the Royal Society, serving on the Society council from 1904 to 1906, and was awarded their Royal Medal in 1930.

He was made an Honorary Fellow of the Royal Society of Edinburgh in 1930.

The fossil Marrella, from the Burgess Shale, was named in his honour by its discoverer, Charles Doolittle Walcott. The mineral marrite, a lead-silver-arsenic sulphide, was named in his honour in 1905.

== Publications ==
- The Scientific Study of Scenery (1900)
- The Geology of the Lake District (1916)
- Deposition of the Sedimentary Rocks (1929)
- Cumberland. Cambridge County Geographies.
- North Lancashire. Cambridge County Geographies. 1912.
- Westmorland. Cambridge County Geographies.

Academic offices
Preceded by Thomas McKenny Hughes	Woodwardian Professor of Geology, University of Cambridge; 1917-1930	Succeeded by Owen Thomas Jones
