= Owen Thomas Jones =

Welsh geologist

- Born: 16 April 1878; Beulah, Ceredigion, Wales
- Died: 5 May 1967 (aged 89)
- Education: University College, Aberystwyth; Trinity College, Cambridge
- Awards: Lyell Medal (1926); Wollaston Medal (1945); Fellow of the Royal Society; FGS
- Scientific career
- Workplaces: University of Manchester; University of Cambridge

Owen Thomas Jones, FRS FGS (16 April 1878 – 5 May 1967) was a Welsh geologist.

== Education ==
He was born in Beulah, near Newcastle Emlyn, Cardiganshire, the only son of David Jones and Margaret Thomas. He attended the local village school in Trewen before going to Pencader Grammar School in 1893. In 1896 he went up to University College, Aberystwyth, to study physics, graduating in 1900. He then went to Trinity College, Cambridge, and was awarded a B.A. degree in Natural Sciences (geology) in 1902.

== Career ==
In 1903 he joined the British Geological Survey, working near his home in Carmarthenshire and Pembrokeshire. In 1910 he was appointed the first professor of geology in Aberystwyth. In 1913 he became professor of geology at the University of Manchester, and then, in 1930, Woodwardian Professor of Geology at the University of Cambridge (until 1943). He dedicated his working life to the study of Welsh geology.

== Awards and honours ==
In 1926 he was elected a Fellow of the Royal Society. In 1956 he was awarded the Royal Medal of the Royal Society, and on receiving it he was described as 'the most versatile of living British geologists'. The same year he was awarded the Wollaston Medal and the Lyell Medal of the Geological Society of London. He was twice president of the Geological Society.

He died at the age of 89 having produced more than 140 publications. A year before his death he published a paper describing the Welsh source of the bluestones of Stonehenge (written in Welsh).

Academic offices
Preceded by John Edward Marr	Woodwardian Professor of Geology, University of Cambridge; 1930-1943	Succeeded by W. B. R. King
