= Edward Fawcett (preservationist) =

English conservationist

Edward (Ted) Charles Richard Fawcett O.B.E., (22 September 1920 – 19 October 2013) was a promoter of garden history, conservationist and head of public relations at The National Trust.

== Early life ==
Fawcett was born near Glasgow in 1920 and raised in Harrogate. His parents were Harold and Una Fawcett. He attended Northaw boarding school and at Uppingham School. He spent three months in Paris learning French before returning to Glasgow to work as an accountant with his mother's family's firm, McClelland Kerr. He joined the Royal Navy Volunteer Reserve as a temporary midshipman, later commissioned as a Sub-Lieutenant.

== Wartime service ==
During World War II, Fawcett served in motor launches in Gibraltar and later moved to Escort destroyers as a Gunnery Control Officer. He took part in Operation Pedestal, a mission to deliver supplies to the besieged island of Malta, serving on HMS Bramham from the end of 1941, which towed the tanker Ohio into Malta. He spent one night in a boat saving survivors from the Santa Eliza from an oil-slicked sea. In 1943 he was Temporary Lieutenant on HMS Talybont. He served in the Atlantic, the Far East, in North Africa and in the D-Day landings.

== Conservationist ==
He left the Navy in 1947 and worked for Shell, where he went to the London School of Economics to study personnel management, and then at Joseph Lucas, a producer of car electrics, and became its overseas director. He took a degree in art history and French at Birkbeck, University of London.

He joined the Garden History Society (GHS) soon after it was formed in 1966. He was chairman 1973 to 1976 and 1988 to 1995; he was made vice-president in 2011.

He was appointed first director of public relations at the National Trust in 1969. He promoted gardens and the rural landscape, not just the houses, and did much to popularise the Trust by introducing innovations such as free entry to properties for members, annual handbooks, cafés and shops. By the time that he left in 1984 membership had increased to over a million. In the 1989 New Year Honours he was appointed OBE for services to the National Trust.

In collaboration with the architect Gordon Ballard he set up a residential course on the conservation of historic gardens at West Dean College, in West Sussex, which ran from 1978 to 1984. With the Architectural Association School of Architecture (AA) he later set up a postgraduate course in garden conservation; his wife Jane was working there on the AA Building Conservation course.

After his retirement he continued with the management of the Osterley Park and House, and, concerned about the neglect of Chiswick House Grounds, in 1984 he became the first chairman of Chiswick House Friends; they commissioned a bench in his memory.

He served on committees of the International Council on Monuments and Sites. He was a Trustee of the London Parks and Gardens Trust.

== Personal life and death ==
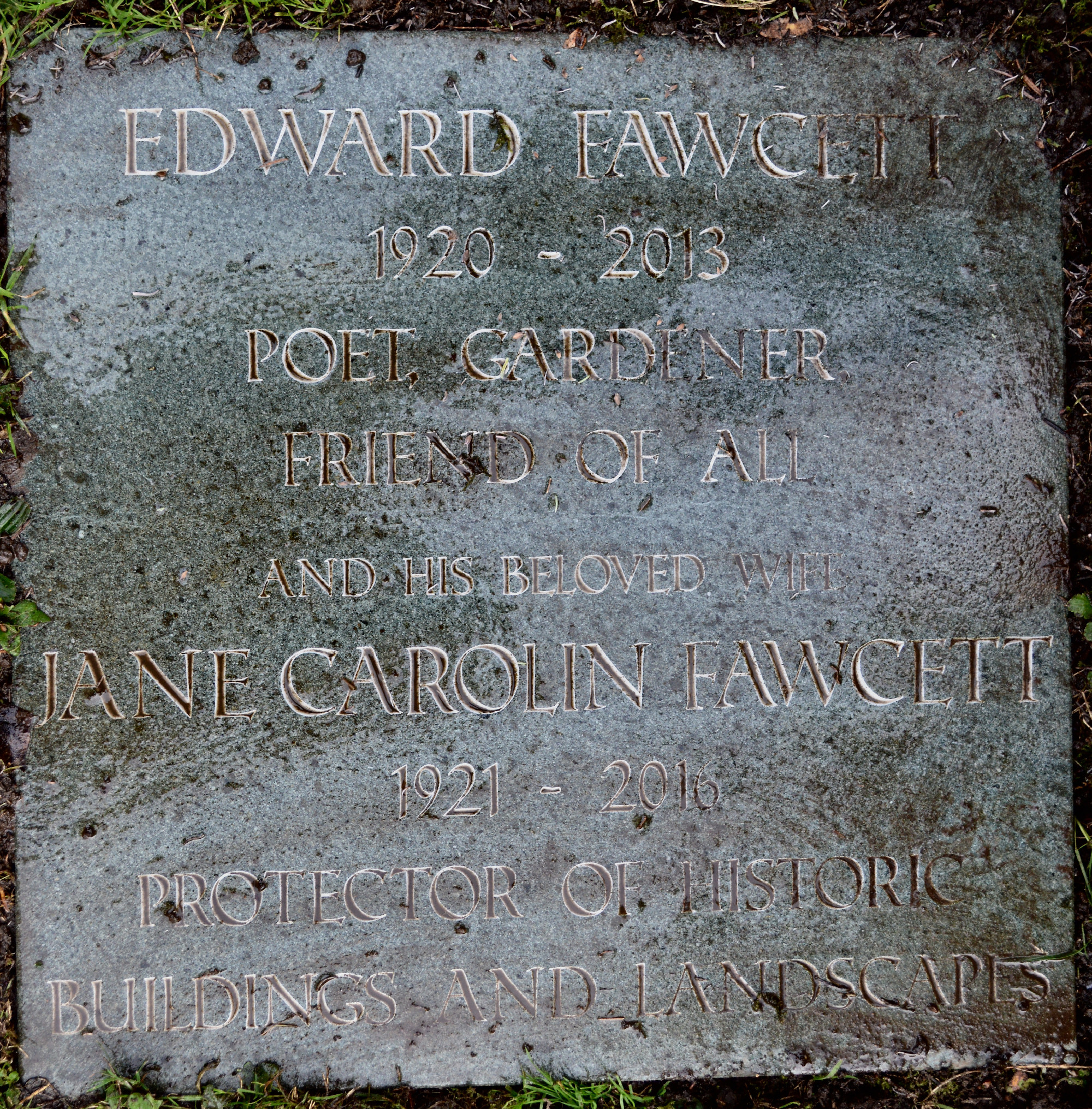
Memorial in the graveyard of St Peter's Church, Petersham, in Richmond, London

Fawcett married Jane Hughes (1921 – 2016) late 1947 and they had two children; Carolin (b 1951), an opera singer, and James (b 1950), an experimental neurologist. The family lived in Hampstead. He stood in the 1982 Hammersmith and Fulham London Borough Council election for the Alliance party.

His funeral service was at St Peter's Church, Petersham.

He also wrote poetry, having five volumes privately published, and was a dowser.

== Publications ==
- Some Poems (1981), privately published by The Stellar Press, Hatfield
- More Poems (1996)
- The Promised Land (1997)
- Late Harvest (2008)
