= Samuel Ogden (priest) =

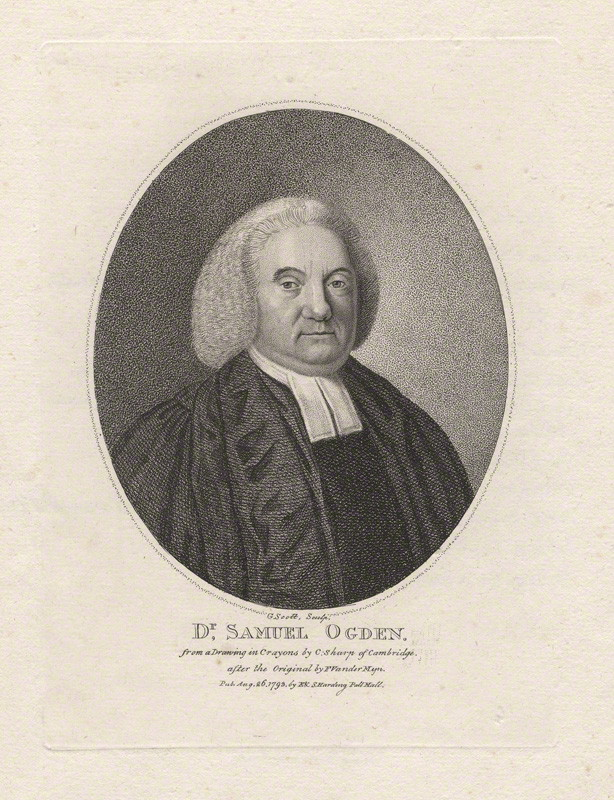
- Born: 28 July 1716; Manchester, England
- Died: 23 March 1778 (aged 61); Cambridge
- Burial place: Church of the Holy Sepulchre, Cambridge

Samuel Ogden (1716–1778) was a priest of Church of England and academic, known as a popular preacher. He held the chair of geology at Cambridge from 1764, but was entirely unqualified in the field.

== Life ==
Born at Manchester on 28 July 1716, he was the only son of Thomas Ogden (died 1766), a dyer there. He was educated at Manchester Grammar School, and admitted to King's College, Cambridge, as a "poor scholar" in March 1733, but moved in August 1736, to St John's College with the prospect of enjoying a Manchester exhibition. He graduated B.A. in January 1737–8, M.A. 1741, B.D. 1748, and D.D. 1753; was elected a Fellow of St John's College on the Ashton foundation on 25 March 1740, became senior fellow on 22 February 1758, and remained in that position until 1768. He was incorporated at Oxford on 11 July 1758.

Ogden gave early support to the poet William Whitehead; who may later have written verse for him. In June 1740 he was ordained deacon by the Bishop of Chester, and was advanced to the priesthood by Richard Reynolds, Bishop of Lincoln, in November 1741. From that date until 1747 he held the perpetual curacy of Coley Chapel of the parish of Halifax, and he was master of Heath Grammar School, Halifax from 1744 until March 1753, when he returned to Cambridge. He retained the perpetual curacy at Elland, in his old parish, until 1762.

Ogden was perpetual curate of the Church of the Holy Sepulchre, Cambridge from 1753, and preached there for about 18 years to crowded congregations, consisting mostly of members of the university. He performed his doctoral exercise for D.D. against John Green before the Duke of Newcastle, Chancellor of the university, who in 1754 conferred on him the vicarage of Damerham in Wiltshire. Finding Ogden free with his opinions, Newcastle gave him no further preferment.

In 1764 he was appointed to the Woodwardian Professorship of Geology at Cambridge, and held it until his death in 1778. Although Ogden apparently was appointed "without any knowledge of the field", he has been called a "good curator" who prepared a catalogue of Woodward's collection to replace Woodward's "perplexing documents" and he addressed issues left over by his predecessors.

He resigned the living of Damerham in 1766 in favour of the Rev. Charles Haynes. From that year until 1778 Ogden held the college living of Lawford in Essex, with the rectory of Stansfield in Suffolk. He chased further patronage, but was unsuccessful. He was a candidate for the Mastership of St John's College in 1765 and in 1775, but on the latter occasion only polled three votes.

== Death and legacy ==
In an attack of paralysis, Ogden died, on 22 March 1778, and was buried on the south side of the communion table at the Church of the Holy Sepulchre. A tablet was placed in the church to his memory.

Ogden left a considerable fortune, which passed to his relatives. He had intended that William Craven, should be his residuary legatee, and had deposited the will with him; but Craven, through Ogden's influence, was appointed in 1770 Sir Thomas Adams's Professor of Arabic. He would accept only the gift of Ogden's Arabic books.

== Preacher ==
Several descriptions have been given of Ogden in the pulpit. Gilbert Wakefield (in Memoirs of the life of Gilbert Wakefield) depicts "a large, black, scowling figure, a ponderous body with a lowering visage, embrowned by the horrors of a sable periwig. His voice was growling and morose, and his sentences desultory, tart, and snappish". John Mainwaring in his Remarks on Pursuits of Literature dwells on his "portly figure, dignified air, broad visage, dark complexion, arched eyebrows and piercing eyes, the solemn, emphatic, commanding utterance". William Paley speaks of the strangeness of his delivery, "a most solemn, drawling, whining tone; he seemed to think he was always in the pulpit".

Ogden was the favourite preacher of George III of Great Britain; and his son Ernest Augustus, King of Hanover recommended his sermons as models for brevity and terseness. James Boswell admired their "subtilty of reasoning", and commended them to Samuel Johnson.

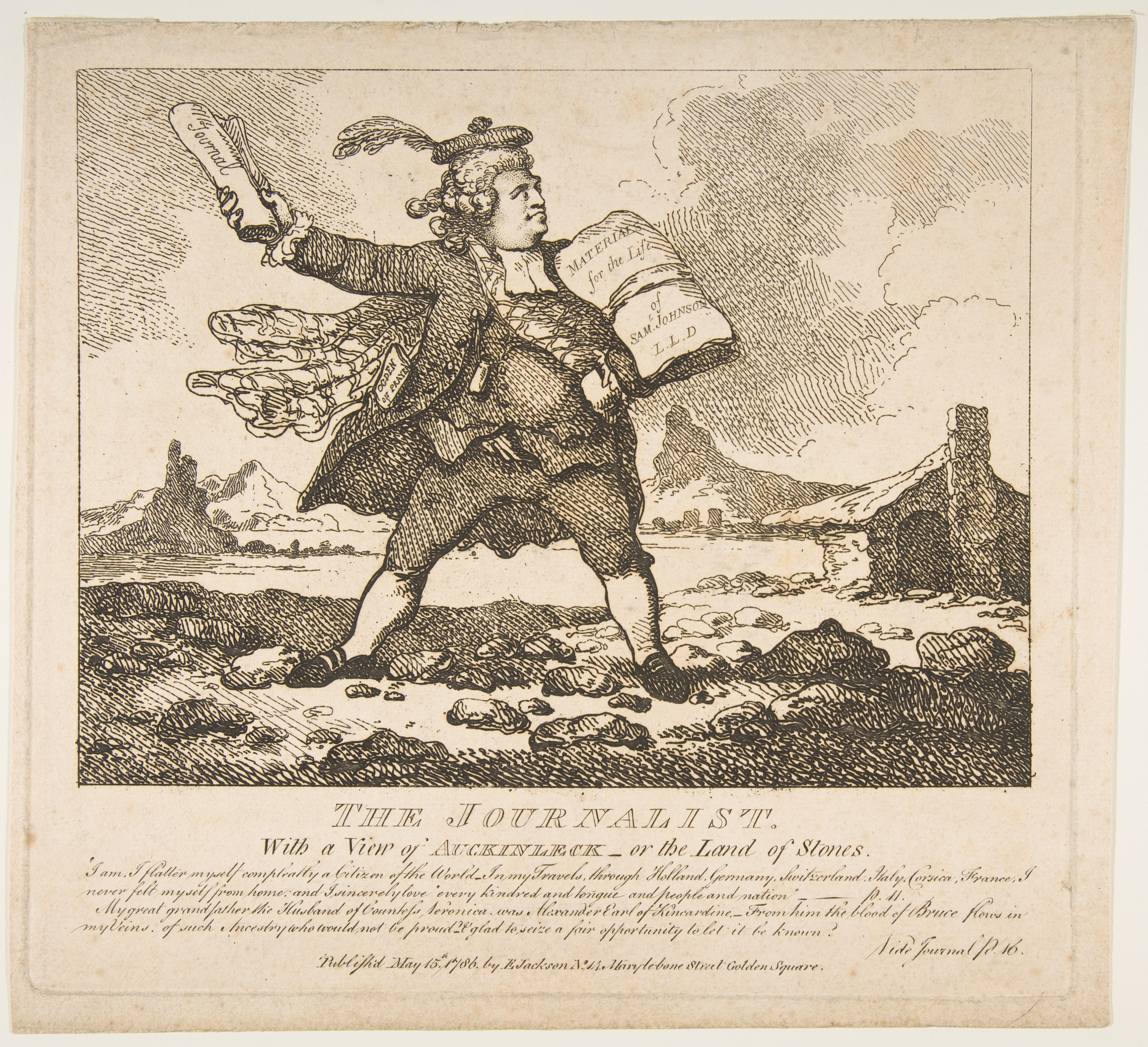
Caricature by Thomas Rowlandson of the Tour of the Hebrides, James Boswell with "Ogden on Prayer" in his jacket pocket

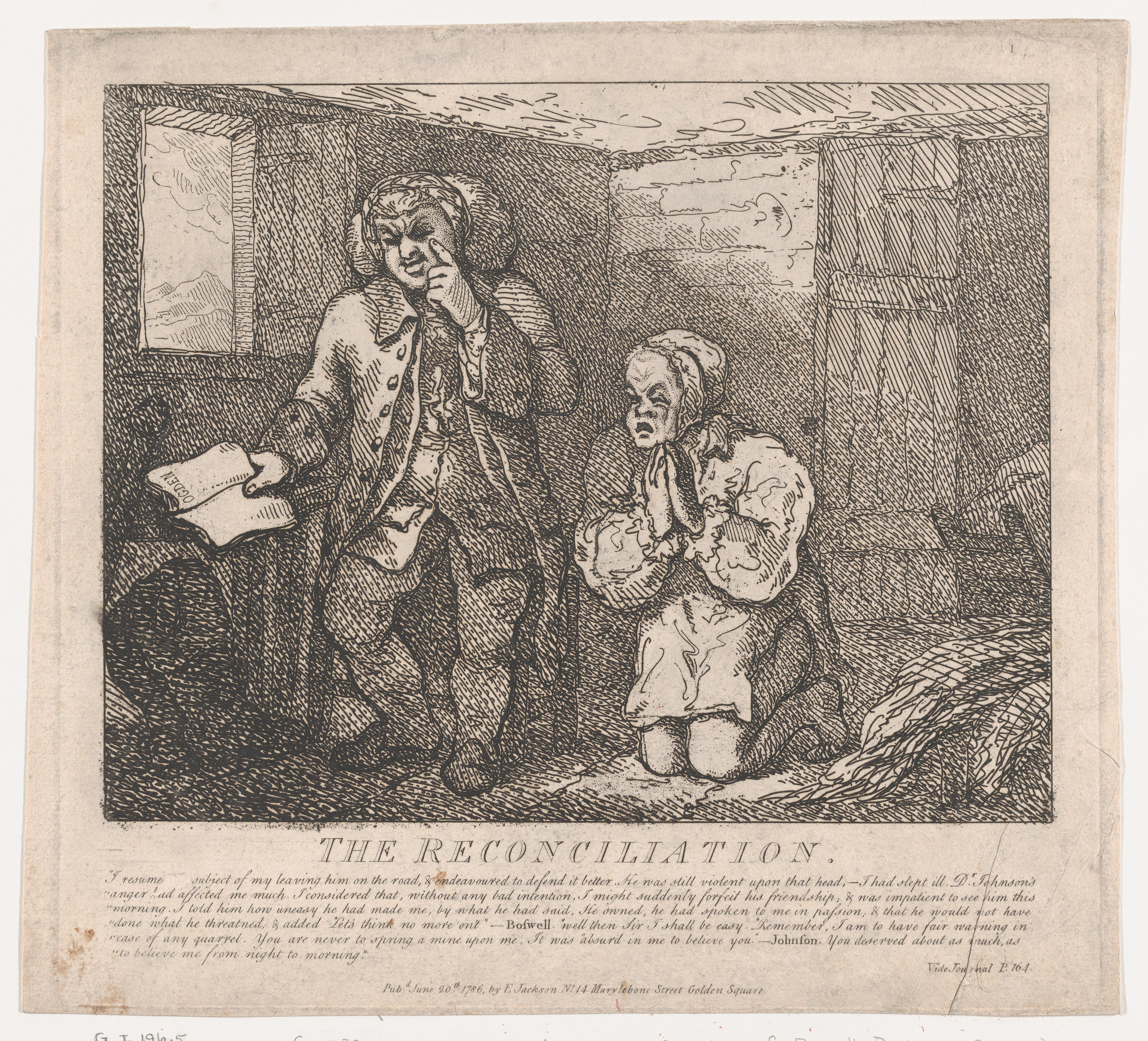
Caricature by Thomas Rowlandson, with Samuel Johnson holding a book of "Ogden", and James Boswell kneeling

== Works ==
Ogden's published discourses were:

- Two sermons preached before the University of Cambridge, 1758.
- Ten sermons on the efficacy of prayer and intercession, 1770; 2nd edit. 1770.
- Twenty-three sermons on the Ten Commandments, 1776.
- Fourteen sermons on the articles of the Christian faith, 1777. Richard Hurd was delighted with them, and purposed putting these into the hands of the young princes.
- Collected sermons, to which are now first added "Sermons on the Lord's Supper." With an account of the Author's Life, and a Vindication of his Writings against some late Objections, 1780, 2 vols.; 1786, 2 vols.; 1788, 2 vols.; 1805, 1 vol. The biographer was Samuel Hallifax; the objector was John Mainwaring (a friend of Ogden and Fellow of St John's), in a volume of Sermons, with a Dissertation on that Species of Composition, 1780. He defended himself against Hallifax in his anonymous Remarks on the Pursuits of Literature, 1798.

In 1832 Thomas Smart Hughes published Ogden's sermons as vol. xxii. of Divines of the Church of England, with a new account of his life.

Ogden contributed to Cambridge collections of verses. That on the accession of George III contained three sets by him, Latin, English, and Arabic; which produced a caustic epigram from Richard Arden, 1st Baron Alvanley.

== Notes ==
Academic offices
| Preceded by John Michell | Woodwardian Professor of Geology, University of Cambridge; 1764-1778 | Succeeded by Thomas Green |
