= Thomas Ashton (divine) =

English cleric

Thomas Ashton, D.D. (1716–1775) was an English cleric.

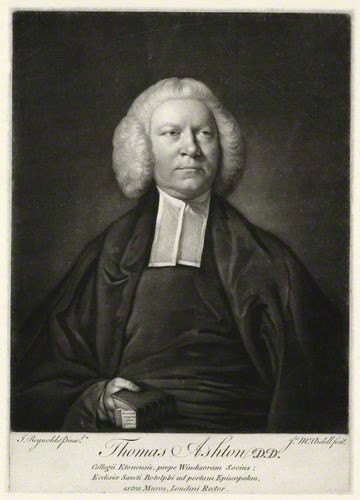
Thomas Ashton, 1756 mezzotint by James Macardell, after Joshua Reynolds.

== Life ==
Ashton was the son of Dr. Ashton, usher of Lancaster grammar school. He was educated at Eton College, where a group of friends formed—Ashton, Thomas Gray, Horace Walpole, and Richard West—who called themselves the "Quadruple Alliance".

Ashton went in 1733 to King's College, Cambridge. He is the "Thomas Ashton, Esq., tutor to the Earl of Plymouth", to whom Walpole addressed his Epistle from Florence.

For some time Ashton held the living of Aldingham, Lancashire; in May 1749 he was presented to the rectory of Sturminster Marshall in Dorset; and in 1752 to the rectory of St Botolph, Bishopsgate. Meanwhile, he had fallen out with Walpole, who complained to Sir Horace Mann, on 25 July 1750, that Ashton had written against his friend Conyers Middleton. Up to this point, Walpole had helped Ashton's advancement in the church.

In 1759 Ashton took the degree of D.D.; in December 1760 he married a Miss Amyand; and in May 1762 was elected preacher at Lincoln's Inn, resigning in 1764. He died on 1 March 1775.

== Works ==
Ashton was the author of a number of sermons, collected in a volume of Sermons on several Occasions, 1770. In 1754 he had an altercation with a Methodist minister of the name of Jones, to whom he addressed A Letter to the Rev. Thomas Jones, intended as a rational and candid answer to his sermon preached at St. Botolph, Bishopsgate. He also wrote some pamphlets against the admission of aliens to Eton fellowships.
