= Joseph Letherland =

Scottish physician

- Born: 1699
- Died: 31 March 1764 (aged 64–65)
- Occupation: Physician

Joseph Letherland (1699 – 31 March 1764) was a Scottish physician.

== Biography ==
Letherland was born at Stratford-on-Avon in 1699. He entered the university of Leyden 30 September 1722, and graduated M.D. 5 July 1724 with an inaugural dissertation, ‘Veterum medicorum sententiæ de Phrenitide curandâ’ (Leyden, 1724, 4to). Some years afterwards he was created doctor of medicine of Cambridge by royal mandate 9 April 1736, and thus qualified for the fellowship of the Royal College of Physicians, where he was admitted candidate 30 September 1736, and fellow 30 September 1737, afterwards holding the office of censor and other college dignities. He was elected physician to St. Thomas's Hospital 7 July 1736, and resigned that office at the close of 1758. In 1761 Letherland was appointed physician to the queen, on the recommendation of Dr. William Heberden the elder, who had declined the honour. He died 31 March 1764, and was buried in the church of St. Mary, Aldermanbury, where a memorial tablet was placed to him.

Letherland always practised in London, but without becoming much known to the public, though he was highly esteemed by his colleagues for his learning and professional attainments. His classical learning was shown in a reply to Conyers Middleton's dissertation on the servile condition of physicians among the Romans, in which he vindicated the position of the Roman physicians: ‘Notæ breves in Dissertationem de Medicorum apud Romanos conditione a C. Middleton editam,’ 8vo, London, 1726. This was his only separate publication, but he is known to have contributed largely to John Fothergill's ‘Account of the Sore Throat attended with Ulcers,’ 1748. The historical portion, identifying the disease with one described by Spanish physicians in the sixteenth and seventeenth centuries, is admitted to be his work (Thomas Healde, Oratio Harveiana, 4to, London, 1765). Indeed, he has the credit of being the first to draw attention to this disease (the modern diphtheria) in 1739 (John Chandler, On the Disease called a Cold, 1761, p. 56), though he modestly never asserted his claim to priority.
