= Reflections on the Variations, or Inconsistencies, Which Are Found Among the Four Evangelists =

Reflec‍tions on the Variations, or Inconſiftencies, which are found among the four Evangelists, in their different Accounts of the ſame Fac‍ts [sic] is an essay by Conyers Middleton; it was published posthumously in 1752 as a part of his Miscellaneous Works.

The inconsistencies in the Gospels of the New Testament found by Middleton were later listed as 11 in number, by William Newcome.
