= Thomas Green (geologist) =

English geologist and professor

Thomas Green (c. 1738 – 2 June 1788) was an English geologist, Woodwardian Professor of Geology at the University of Cambridge between 1778 and his death.

Green was born in Wymeswold, Leicestershire, and his father was also called Thomas. He was educated at the Loughborough school of Mr Parkinson (now Loughborough Grammar School). He was admitted to Trinity College, Cambridge as a sizar on 11 June 1756, and matriculated in the Michaelmas term of 1756. He became a scholar in 1759, was awarded a B.A. in 1760 and an M.A. in 1763.

Green was appointed Woodwardian Professor of Geology in 1778, succeeding Samuel Ogden. He was succeeded by John Hailstone.

Academic offices
| Preceded by Samuel Ogden | Woodwardian Professor of Geology, University of Cambridge; 1778-1788 | Succeeded by John Hailstone |
