= Thomas McKenny Hughes =

British geologist

- Born: 17 December 1832; Aberystwyth, Wales
- Died: 9 June 1917 (aged 84); Cambridge, England
- Education: Trinity College, Cambridge
- Spouse: Mary Caroline Weston
- Children: 3
- Scientific career
- Fields: Geology
- Workplaces: University of Cambridge
- Academic advisors: Adam Sedgwick
- Notable students: Gertrude Elles; John Edward Marr

Thomas McKenny Hughes (17 December 1832 – 9 June 1917) was a Welsh geologist. He was Woodwardian Professor of Geology at Cambridge University.

== Private life ==
Thomas M. Hughes was born in Aberystwyth, one of the nine children (six sisters, two brother) of the Welsh bishop Joshua Hughes (1807–1889) and his wife Margaret Hughes (née McKenny). His younger brother Joshua Pritchard Hughes (1847–1938) was bishop of Llandaff. The Mckenny connection was through his maternal grandfather, Sir Thomas McKenny, first baronet and Lord Mayor of Dublin.

Thomas Hughes married Mary Caroline Weston in 1882 (daughter of Rev. G.F. Weston of Crosby Ravensworth, Westmoreland). She was 30 years younger than him, and the marriage happened because of a change in rules at Cambridge University. They had three sons, Tom, George and Alfred. Tom was killed in 1918 whilst carrying out aerial reconnaissance behind enemy lines in France. George was a clerk to the Worshipful Company of Goldsmiths, and Alfred was an entomologist.

== Education and career ==
Hughes received the first part of his education at Leamington and Llandovery, and matriculated at Trinity College, Cambridge in 1853, from which he graduated in 1857, and as M.A. in 1867. Hughes had attended Adam Sedgwick's lectures in Geology and was a member of the Sedgwick Club which formed in Adam Sedgwick's honour.

From 1860 to 1861, Hughes held the post of secretary to the British consul in Rome, Charles Newton and later as acting Consul. It was at this time his interest in archaeology was sparked. Whilst in Rome, Hughes made collections of fossils from the local area.

In 1861, the then Director-General of the Geological Survey, Sir Roderick Murchison offered Hughes a position. He began his Survey work as an Assistant Geologist. Hughes continued working for the Survey until 1873.

During his Survey career, Hughes worked in the following areas. Between 1865 and 1866 he was based in Hertford and St. Albans where he described the Drift Gravels. Then in 1866, Hughes was transferred to the Lake District and superintended by W. T. Aveline. Here he collected fossils from the 'Silurians'. He sided with Sedgwick in relation to the lower boundary of the Silurian, to the disagreement of Murchison. He also believed the 'Old Red Conglomerate to form a sort of passage between the Mountain Limestone and the Millstone Grit'. Hughes worked in Westmoreland, Cumberland and the Yorkshire Dales. In 1873 he lived in Sedbergh.

In the 1870s McKenny Hughes entered into correspondence with Charles Lyell. He started a debate regarding Mountain Limestone country. Lyell and Hughes went on many geological expeditions together. In 1872 they visited the limestone caves in the Dordogne and Aurignac.

Hughes returned to Cambridge University to succeed Adam Sedgwick as Woodwardian Professor of Geology in 1873. Nine candidates had applied for this post; Hughes got it with a small majority over Professor Thomas George Bonney.

Following his marriage in 1882, he taught his wife geology and she became a researcher in her own right. She also acted as a chaperone so that women students could attend fieldwork, in addition to lectures and practical classes. This resulted in an increase in women students in the Geology Department at Cambridge and a third of the university's Geological Club, the Sedgwick Club, were women.

Thomas and Mary McKenny Hughes attended the International Geological Congress in Berlin in 1885, in London in 1888, in Washington in 1891, in Zurich in 1894 and in Russia in 1897. She kept diaries and scrapbooks of their trips together.

Whilst Woodwardian Professor, McKenny Hughes endeavoured to establish a lasting memorial to Adam Sedgwick, in the form of a Museum and school of geology. This memorial museum would replace the cramped and inadequate Woodwardian Museum in the Cockerell Building near Senate House. An appeal committee was established and by 1878 they held £12,000. It would take another 26 years for the memorial to be built. Sir Thomas Graham Jackson was the chosen architect. The Sedgwick Museum was opened on 1 March 1904 by King Edward VII and Queen Alexandra.

== Later life ==
Hughes died at his home 'Ravensworth', Brooklands Avenue in Cambridge, 9 June 1917. His wife died a year later. His grandson, Graham Hughes, was later the art director of Goldsmiths' Company, who were behind the renaissance in modern silver design.

== Awards and work ==
His over 50 research publications, mainly on work performed during his time at the Survey, are mainly about Precambrian and Palaeozoic formations in Wales, as well as of the Lake District. He also worked on glacial deposits. Hughes was vice-president of the Geological Society in 1862, elected a Fellow of the Royal Society in 1889, and Lyell Medal recipient in 1891.

== Archives ==
17 boxes of the records of Thomas McKenny Hughes are at the Sedgwick Museum of Earth Sciences. The collection contains correspondence with contemporaries including Sir Charles Lyell and his wife; reports and papers concerning both his diplomatic and geological work 1860-1880s; records of the international geological congresses in Bologna, London, Zurich and Russia 1880s–1890s; tour and field-note books including sketches and annotated drawings; maps; records relating to the Woodwardian Museum; drafts of papers and speeches; and some photographic albums. A collection-level description is available on the Archives Hub. The Museum also has some of the records of Mary Caroline Hughes.

17 volumes and 6 boxes of Hughes family records can also be found at Cambridge University Library: Department of Manuscripts and University Archives.

There are also papers at Cambridgeshire Archives. These derive from Hughes membership of the Council of the Cambs & Isle of Ely Chamber of Agriculture, of which he was vice-chairman in 1902 and chairman in 1903–4.

Academic offices
Preceded by Adam Sedgwick	Woodwardian Professor of Geology, University of Cambridge; 1873-1917	Succeeded by John Edward Marr
