= Zachary Brooke (theologian) =

English clergyman and academic

Zachary Brooke (1716–1788) was an English clergyman and academic, Lady Margaret's Professor of Divinity at the University of Cambridge.

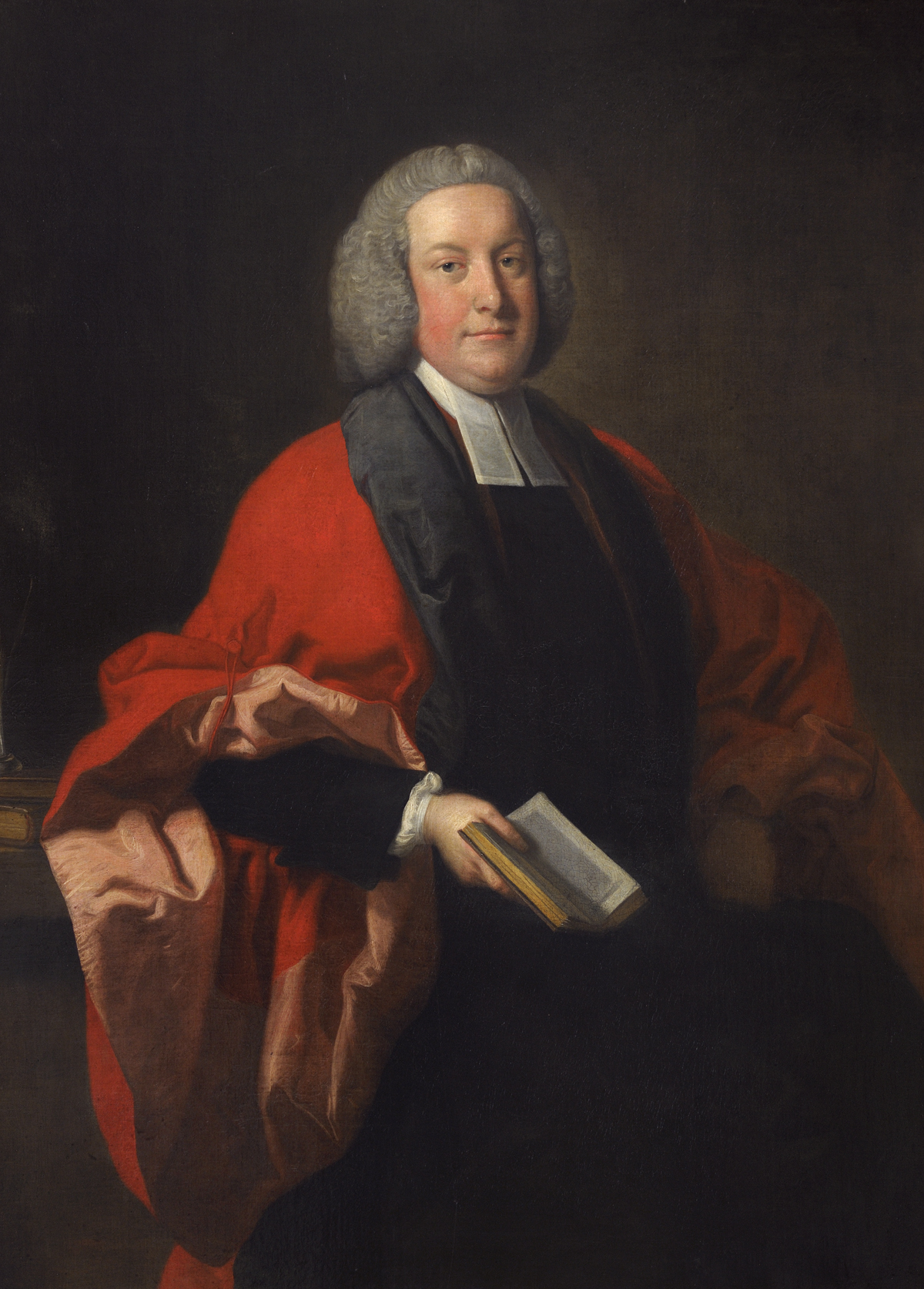
Zachary Brooke, 1754 portrait by Thomas Hudson.

== Life ==
The son of Zachary Brooke, a graduate of Sidney Sussex College, Cambridge (B.A. 1693-4, and M. A. 1697), and at one time vicar of Hawkston-cum-Newton, near Cambridge, was born in 1716 at Hamerton, Huntingdonshire. He was educated at Stamford school, and was admitted a sizar of St. John's College, Cambridge, 28 June 1734. He was subsequently elected a fellow there, proceeded B.A. in 1737, M.A. in 1741, B.D. in 1748, and D.D. in 1753.

He was elected to the Margaret professorship of divinity at Cambridge in 1765, and was at the same time a candidate for the mastership of St. John's College. He was chaplain to the king from 1758, and was vicar of Ickleton, Cambridgeshire, and rector of Forncett St. Mary and St. Peter, Suffolk. He died at Forncett on 7 August 1788. He had married the daughter of W. Hanchet.

== Works ==
He attacked the Free Inquiry of Conyers Middleton in his Defensio miraculorum quæ in ecclesia christiana facta esse perhibentur post tempora Apostolorum, Cambridge, 1748, which appeared in English in 1750. This work called forth several 'Letters' in reply. Brooke was also the author of a collection of sermons, issued in 1763.
