= William Bellenden =

17th-century Scottish classical scholar

William Bellenden (c. 1550 – c. 1633) was a Scottish classical scholar.

James I of England and Ireland; VI of Scotland appointed him magister libellorum supplicum or master of requests. King James is also said to have provided Bellenden with the means of living independently at Paris, where he became professor at the university, and advocate in the parliament.

== Works ==
The first of the works by which he is known was published anonymously in 1608, with the title Ciceronis Princeps, a laborious compilation of all Cicero's remarks on the origin and principles of regal government, digested and systematically arranged. In 1612 there appeared a similar work, devoted to the consideration of consular authority and the Roman Senate, Ciceronis Consul, Senator, Senatusque Romanus. His third work, De Statu Prisci Orbis, 1615, is a good outline of general history. All three works were combined in a single large volume, entitled De Statu Libri Tres, 1615, which was first brought into due notice by Dr Samuel Parr, who, in 1787, published an edition with a preface, famous for the elegance of its Latinity, in which he eulogized Burke, Fox and Lord North as the "three English luminaries."

The greatest of Bellenden's works is the extensive treatise De Tribus Luminibus Romanorum, printed and published posthumously at Paris in 1633. The book is unfinished, and treats only of the first luminary, Cicero; the others intended were apparently Seneca and Pliny. It contains a most elaborate history of Rome and its institutions, drawn from Cicero, and thus forms a storehouse of all the historical notices contained in that voluminous author. It is said that nearly all the copies were lost on the passage to England. One of the few that survived was placed in the university library at Cambridge, and freely drawn upon by Conyers Middleton, the librarian, in his History of the Life of Cicero. Both Joseph Warton and Dr Parr accused Middleton of deliberate plagiarism, which was the more likely to have escaped detection owing to the small number of existing copies of Bellenden's work.
