= Richard Hill Tiddeman =

Geologist

Richard Hill Tiddeman (11 February 1842 – 20 February 1917) was a British geologist, known as a leading expert on the Carboniferous rocks of the counties of Yorkshire, Cumberland, and Lancashire.

== Biography ==
Richard Hill Tiddeman, whose father was an Anglican cleric and Oxford alumnus, was educated at Llanrwst Grammar School and matriculated in 1858 at Oriel College, Oxford. There he graduated with a B.A. in 1862 and an M.A. in 1872. He was employed by the Geological Survey of England and Wales from 1864 to 1870 as an Assistant Geologist and from 1870 to 1902 as a Geologist. He served under the Survey's four successive directors Roderick Murchison, Andrew Ramsay, James Geikie, and Jethro Teall. Tiddeman contributed to many of the Survey's memoirs, maps, and other publications.

Although most of Tiddeman's research involved the Carboniferous rocks of north Lancashire, West Yorkshire, and Westmorland, he also worked in North Wales and South Glamorgan. His fame stems primarily from his pioneering research on reef knolls near Settle and the Quaternary deposits of the Victoria Cave (which is often visited from walking tours from Settle). In London in September 1888 at the 4th International Geological Congress, he presented his ideas about the formation of the fossil reef mounds that fringe the Askrigg Block and how geologic fault movements influence sedimentary deposition. At the congress, he and John Edward Marr led a geological excursion near Settle from Monday, September 24th to Saturday, September 29th.

Tiddeman was awarded the Murchison Medal in 1911. At the award ceremony, which Tiddeman was unable to attend due to a sudden attack of influenza, Edmund Johnston Garwood noted the importance of Tiddeman's research for understanding glaciation and the mammalian fauna of the Pleistocene. In 1914 the Yorkshire Geological Society elected Tiddeman as president.

Geike's hypothesis that the Pleistocene consisted of 4 major glacial periods and 3 major interglacial periods was significantly influenced by Tiddeman, as well as Searles V. Wood and John Aitken. In his study of the Victoria Cave, Tiddeman identified pre-glacial cave deposits with hippopotamus, hyena, and human bones. He supervised the excavations from 1873 to 1878 following excavations by William Boyd Dawkins — however, Dawkins disputed Tiddeman's (valid) hypotheses concerning ice ages and interglacial periods.

After his retirement in 1902, Tiddeman lived in Oxford but frequently went to London to attend meetings of the Geological Society. Upon his death in 1917 he was survived by his widow and their two daughters.

== Selected publications ==
- Tiddeman, R. H. (1871). "The Work and Problems of the Victoria Cave Exploration". Proceedings of the Yorkshire Geological Society. 6 (1): 77–92. Bibcode:1871PYGS....6...77T. doi:10.1144/pygs.6.77.
- Tiddeman, R. H. (1872). "Discovery of Extinct Mammals in the Victoria Caves, Settle". Nature. 6 (137): 127–128. doi:10.1038/006127b0. S2CID 4048838.
- Tiddeman, R. H. (1873). "IV.—The Older Deposits in the Victoria Cave, Settle, Yorkshire". Geological Magazine. 10 (103): 11–16. Bibcode:1873GeoM...10...11T. doi:10.1017/S0016756800470330. S2CID 129393155.
- Tiddeman, R. H. (1878). "On the Age of the Hyaena-Bed at the Victoria Cave, Settle, and Its Bearing on the Antiquity of Man". The Journal of the Anthropological Institute of Great Britain and Ireland. 7: 165–185. doi:10.2307/2841385. JSTOR 2841385.
- Tiddeman, R. H. (1889). "Brilliant Meteors". Nature. 41 (1049): 105. doi:10.1038/041105c0. S2CID 4035769.
- Tiddeman, R. H. (1890). "Physical History of the Carboniferous Rocks in Upper Aire-dale". Proceedings of the Yorkshire Geological Society. 11 (3): 482–492. Bibcode:1890PYGS...11..482T. doi:10.1144/pygs.11.3.482.
- Dakyns, John Roche; Tiddeman, Richard Hill; Gunn, William; Strahan, Sir Aubrey; Fox-Strangways, Charles; Goodchild, John George (1890). "Chapter III. Carboniferous Rocks. Section. The Caves by R. H. Tiddeman". The Geology of the Country Around Ingleborough, with Parts of Wensleydale and Wharfedale: (Explanation of Quarter-sheet 97 S.W., New Series, Sheet 50). pp. 33–40.
- Dakyns, John Roche; Tiddeman, Richard Hill; Russell, Robert; Clough, Charles Thomas; Strahan, Sir Aubrey (1891). "Chapter XII. Permian and Triassic Rocks by W. T. Aveline and R. H. Tiddeman". The Geology of the Country Around Mallerstang, with Parts of Wensleydale, Swaledale, and Arkendale: (Explanation of Quarter-sheet 97 N.W., New Series, Sheet 40). pp. 161–164.
- Tiddeman, R. H. (1900). "III.—On the Age of the Raised Beach of Southern Britain as seen in Gower". Geological Magazine. 7 (10): 441–443. Bibcode:1900GeoM....7..441T. doi:10.1017/S0016756800183335. S2CID 129710020.
- Tiddeman, R. H. (1901). "VI.—On the Formation of Reef Knolls". Geological Magazine. 8 (1): 20–23. Bibcode:1901GeoM....8...20T. doi:10.1017/S0016756800174758. S2CID 131475293.
- Tiddeman, R. H. (1910). The Water Supply of Oxfordshire, with Records of Sinkings and Borings. H.M. Stationery Office; 108 pages
