= Charles Mason (geologist) =

- Born: c. 1698
- Died: 18 December 1770 (aged 71–72)
- Education: DD, Trinity College, Cambridge, 1749
- Occupations: Academic and clergyman
- Known for: Woodwardian Professor (1734–1762)

Charles Mason (c. 1698 – 18 December 1770) was an academic and a clergyman of the Church of England.

== Education and clerical life ==
He was schooled at Wem, Shropshire, and became a Fellow of Trinity College, Cambridge in 1725.

At Trinity he gained a BA in 1723, an MA in 1726, was incorporated at Oxford in 1731 and went on to be awarded a BD from Trinity College, Cambridge in 1736 and a DD, in 1749.

He was ordained as a Deacon in 1733, became Vicar of Barrington, Cambridgeshire, in 1742 and was later Rector of Orwell, Cambridgeshire (1762–1771).

== Academic life ==
Mason was appointed as the Woodwardian Professor of Geology in 1734, a position he held until 1762, and he was elected as a Fellow of the Royal Society in 1742.

=== The Woodwardian Professorship ===
The Woodwardian Professorship was almost a sinecure for the early holders of the office and, like most of the early appointees, Mason had no qualifications in geology. The diligence he applied to the role has been questioned; during the period of his professorship

he printed a single Latin lecture (in 1734). Like Middleton, he devotes the greater part of it to praise of Woodward and his executors ; and then, after commending the clause in the above letter to the Vice-Chancellor which makes the Lecturer's stipend depend on his reading lectures, he ends with a promise to devote his best energies to the work. Notwithstanding this engagement, we believe that all he did was to make a considerable private collection of fossils, which was sold by auction after his death. It is noteworthy that he was Vicar of Harrington in Cambridgeshire from 1742 to 1747, and Rector of Orwell in the same county from 1747 to his death. As no man can be in two places at once, and as Woodward had expressly forbidden his Lecturer to hold any preferment, office, or post, which might interfere with his duty as set forth in the Will, it is evident that Mason must have neglected either his parish in favour of his lectureship, or his lectureship in favour of his parish.

Various writers have also alleged that the integrity of the collections which Woodward passed on, only about 30 years earlier, were compromised by Mason's actions whilst Woodwardian Professor; a letter sent by John Price, in 1756, to Alexander Catcott records that he had visited Woodward's collection in Cambridge, and that: "Dr Mason has taken it into his head to discard all the peat fossils, not allowing them to be ante-deluvian. His argument for this is that peat-earth is continually forming and growing at this day. Consequently that it by degrees in time increases and covers whatever nuts, twigs, etc are accidentally on its surface". Price's concern may reflect a comment written a hundred years after Mason's appointment: "This gentleman anxious, it would seem, to be useful, and not having at that day the means of increasing and improving the contents of the Museum, thought fit unfortunately to re-arrange or rather de-range the whole, and, by attempting to follow a plan proposed by Dr. Woodward in a published essay, has destroyed the integrity of the collections, and prevented that comparison with the printed catalogue which formed a great part of the value and interest of the cabinets, while they remained in their original condition and as they had come into the possession of the University. It cannot but be regretted that so much time and labour as seem to have been expended in this worse than useless task should not have been usefully employed in some pursuit more congenial, or at all events more innocent".

=== Other academic activity ===
It was Mason who made the extraordinary discovery, in the library of Trinity College, of a packet of thirty loose and tattered folio leaves, almost covered with the handwriting of Milton. It is thought that Mason recognised the nature of this material around 1735 and the loose-leaf sheets were bound for the first time in 1736. This forms what is now known as Milton's poetical notebook, or the Trinity Manuscript, which has been described as “the chief treasure of Trinity Library”.

During his life, Mason compiled a complete map of Cambridgeshire which was later published in 1806, long after his death.

== Death ==
The inscription on his tomb at St Andrew's Church, Orwell, Cambridgeshire, reads Senior Fellow of Trinity College and Woodwardian Profeſſor of Foſſils, F.R.S. and Rector of Orwell. Departed this life on December 18th 1770, in the 72nd year of his Age; on that basis his date of birth must have been in 1698 (or in the final few weeks of 1697) rather than the more frequently quoted 1699.

== Publications ==
- Charles Mason (1734) Oratio de physiologiæ explicandæ munere, ex celeberrimi Woodwardi Testamento instituto.

Academic offices
Preceded by Conyers Middleton	Woodwardian Professor of Geology, University of Cambridge; 1734-1762	Succeeded by John Michell
