= Woodwardian Professor of Geology =

The Woodwardian Professor of Geology is a professorship held in the Department of Earth Sciences at the University of Cambridge. It was founded by John Woodward in 1728 under the title of Professor of Fossils. Woodward's will left to the University a large collection of fossils and also dictated that the professor should be elected by the Archbishop of Canterbury, the Bishop of Ely, the President of the Royal Society, the President of the Royal College of Physicians, the Member of Parliament for the University of Cambridge, and the University Senate.

Woodward's will directed that the person appointed would be paid £100 a year to read at least four lectures a year on a subject treated in his "Natural History of the Earth" and that they would look after Woodward's collection and catalogues. The Woodwardian Professors of the eighteenth century were not expected to teach but were expected to make themselves available for discussion with friends, visitors and students on a casual, personal basis.

Sedgwick and his predecessors were all appointed under the terms of Woodward's original bequest. Before Sedgwick's appointment, geology was not taught in any systematic way at Cambridge and the office had been almost a sinecure. From Sedgwick's time the Woodwardian Professorship became a highly respected Chair of geology.

== Incumbents of the Woodwardian Professorship of Geology ==
- Conyers Middleton, 1731
- Charles Mason, 1734 (died 1770 and described on his tomb in Orwell church as "Woodwardian Professor of Fossils")
- John Michell, 1762
- Samuel Ogden, 1764
- Thomas Green, 1778
- John Hailstone, 1788
- Adam Sedgwick, 1818
- Thomas McKenny Hughes, 1873
- John Edward Marr, 1917
- Owen Thomas Jones, 1930
- William Bernard Robinson King, 1943
- Oliver Meredith Boone Bulman, 1955
- Harry Blackmore Whittington, 1966-1983
- Ian Nicholas McCave, 1985-2008
- David A. Hodell, 2008-

== See also ==
- List of Professorships at the University of Cambridge
