= Douglas Scott =

Doug or Douglas Scott may refer to:

== Public officials ==
- Douglas Scott (politician) (1920–2012), Australian National Party senator
- Douglas Scott (judge) (born 1941), South African on Supreme Court of Appeal
- Douglas P. Scott (born 1960), American legislator and mayor in Illinois

== Writers ==
- Douglas Scott (writer) (1926–1996), British author of thriller fiction
- Doug Scott (1941–2020), English mountaineer and author
- George Douglas Scott, British computer scientist since 1981, chairman of TEDCO and author, a/k/a Doug Scott
- Douglas D. Scott, American archaeologist and historian since 1987

== Others ==
- Douglas Scott (designer) (1913–1990), British industrial originator of Routemaster double-decker bus
- Doug Scott (Canadian football) (born 1955), CFL defensive end and tackle
- Douglas Scott (choreographer), American dancer and artistic director since 1990
