= Queen's Award for Enterprise Promotion =

Awards in the UK

The Queen's Award for Enterprise Promotion is one of the Queen's Awards for Enterprise, and is awarded annually to people who play an outstanding role in promoting the growth of business enterprise and/or entrepreneurial skills in other people. It is bestowed by the Queen on the advice of the prime minister of the United Kingdom. Recipients receive an engraved crystal glass commemorative item, a Grant of Appointment and are invited to a reception at Buckingham Palace. Sometimes the award is presented by another member of the British Royal Family, and sometimes at another location.

For example, people who:

- give up their time – and sometimes provide financial support – to help potential entrepreneurs in education or in the early phases of business development
- work in education, training or youth work and help provide others with enterprise skills
- are involved in social enterprise and either achieve business outcomes or help others develop business skills

Entry is by nomination only and people cannot nominate themselves.

Thirteen awardees have been from the National Enterprise Network.

== History ==
The award was initiated in 2004, with the first awards being made in 2005. The award is for achievement in enterprise promotion, between five and ten awards have been made annually since 2005, in addition to one lifetime achievement award each year and sometimes an honorary award (three such awards have been made as of 2015).

== 2005 ==
=== Lifetime Achievement ===
- Kenneth O'Neill, Professor of Entrepreneurship and Small Business Development, School of Marketing, Entrepreneurship and Strategy, University of Ulster, Northern Ireland

=== Achievement in Enterprise Promotion ===
- Sikander Badat, head of policy, Ethnic Minority Business Development, Chamber Link, Bolton
- Alan Barrell, FRSA, chairman of several companies, Cambridge
- Dinah Bennett, FRSA, OBE, programme director, Policy and International Development Centre for Executive Education and Enterprise, Durham Business School, Durham
- Stephen Dumbell, chief executive officer, Knowsley Development Trust, Merseyside
- Diane Gowland, director, Centre for Innovation and Partnerships, Newham College, London
- Gary McEwan, managing director, The Maitland Partnership Ltd, Hillington, Renfrewshire
- Brian Murray, chief executive, Workspace, The Business Centre, Draperstown, Magherafelt, Northern Ireland
- Joy Nichols, chief executive, Nichols Agency Ltd, London
- Edward Prosser, inventor/innovator, Cardiff
- Charles Skene, OBE, founder and trustee, Skene Young Entrepreneurs Award, Aberdeen

== 2006 ==
=== Lifetime Achievement ===
- David Rowe, director of the University of Warwick Science Park Ltd, West Midlands.

=== Achievement in Enterprise Promotion ===
- John Anderson CBE, non-executive chairman of the North-East Business and Innovation Centre, Sunderland
- Derek Browne, chief executive of Entrepreneurs in Action, London.
- Janet Brumby, development manager of Young Enterprise, Hull and East Riding.
- Walter Herriot OBE, managing director of St John's Innovation Centre, Cambridge
- Jason Holt, director, R Holt & Co, London.
- Bryan Keating, managing partner of the CIP partnership, visiting professor at the University of Ulster and chairman of the advisory board of the Northern Ireland Centre for Entrepreneurship, Belfast.
- David Kirby, professor of entrepreneurship, University of Surrey, Guildford.
- Amanda Parris, business centre manager, Rotherham Investment and Development Office, Rotherham Metropolitan Borough Council, South Yorkshire.
- Peter Westgarth, chief executive, The Duke of Edinburgh's Award Scheme and former chief executive of Young Enterprise UK, Oxford.

=== Honorary ===
- Douglas Richard, director and co-founder, Library House, Cambridge.

== 2007 ==
=== Lifetime Achievement ===
- Joan Richards MBE, youth business advisor, Business Connect, Neath, Port Talbot, Wales

=== Achievement in Enterprise Promotion ===
- Pauline Barnett, deputy chief executive, East London Small Business Centre Ltd., London.
- Nigel Brown, chairman, NW Brown Group Limited, Cambridge.
- Jane Delfino, innovations director, United Learning Trust, Manchester.
- Anne Duncan, chief executive, Yellowfin Ltd., Southampton.
- Geoffrey Ford, chairman, Ford Component Manufacturing Limited, South Shields, Tyne and Wear.
- Charles Hadcock, owner and director, The Watermark, Preston, Lancashire.
- Janet Scicluna, proprietor, Janet Scicluna associates, Cardiff.
- David Secher, chief executive, N8 Group, Sheffield.
- Caroline Theobald, managing director, Bridge Club Ltd., Newcastle upon Tyne.

== 2008 ==
=== Lifetime Achievement ===
- John Eversley MBE, director and vice-chair, Tyne and Wear Enterprise Trust Ltd, Newcastle upon Tyne.

=== Achievement in Enterprise Promotion ===
- Zulfiqar Ali, chairman, Reach BCS, Rochdale, Lancashire.
- Sally Arkley, managing director, Women's Business Development Agency, Coventry, Warwickshire.
- Paul Barry-Walsh, chairman, Fredericks Foundation, Lightwater, Surrey and chairman, Netstore plc, Reading, Berkshire.
- Brian Dunsby, principal, Perlex associates, Harrogate, North Yorkshire.
- John Jennens, business counsellor, Oxfordshire Business Enterprise, Banbury, Oxfordshire.
- Michael Leithrow, executive director and general manager, Northern Pinetree Trust, Birtley, County Durham.
- John May, chief executive, Career Academies UK, London.
- Pamela Neal, mentor and workshop facilitator, CODA Business Management Ltd, Newport, Wales.
- Janette Pallas, business incubation and enterprise manager, De Montfort University, Leicester.

=== Honorary ===
- Nicholas O'Shiel, director and chief executive, Omagh Enterprise Company Ltd, Omagh, County Tyrone, Northern Ireland.

== 2009 ==
=== Lifetime Achievement ===
- (Arthur) Allan Gibb OBE, former director, Small Business Centre, Durham University, Durham

=== Achievement in Enterprise Promotion ===
- Karen Arnold, Chief Executive, The Enterprise and Skills Company Limited, Wimborne, Dorset.
- Charles John Cracknell, Youth Enterprise and Microbusiness Manager and founder of John Cracknell Youth Enterprise Bank, Hull City Council, East Riding of Yorkshire.
- Jacqueline Frost, enterprise projects manager, Rotherham Metropolitan Borough Council, South Yorkshire.
- David Irwin, partner, Irwin Grayson associates, Stocksfield, Northumberland.
- James Murray Wells, founder and Executive Chairman of Prescription Eyewear Limited (trading as Glasses Direct), London.
- Beverley Pold, Business Development and Policy Manager, Chwarae Teg/Fair Play, Cardiff.
- John Thompson, Roger M Bale Professor of Entrepreneurship, University of Huddersfield, West Yorkshire.
- Angela Wright, chief executive, Solent Skill Quest Limited, Southampton, Hampshire.
- Charlotte Young, Chair of Board of Trustees, School for Social Entrepreneurs, London.

=== Honorary ===
- Charles Gerard Ford, director and chief executive of Advantage Northern Ireland Limited, Newtownabbey, Northern Ireland.

== 2010 ==
In 2009 there were postal delays due to a strike, and the nomination period for 2010 was extended to 4 November 2009.

=== Lifetime Achievement ===
- (George) Douglas Scott, chief executive officer, TEDCO Ltd, Jarrow, Tyne and Wear.

=== Achievement in Enterprise Promotion ===
- Timothy Allan, former chair, Young Enterprise Scotland, Glasgow, Scotland.
- Nicholas Bowen, head teacher, St Benet Biscop Catholic High School, Bedlington, Northumberland.
- Paul Davidson, chief executive, Bolton Business Ventures, Bolton, Lancashire.
- Simon Denny, associate dean, Research and Knowledge Transfer, Northampton Business School, University of Northampton, Northamptonshire.
- Beverly Hurley, chief executive, YTKO, Cambridge.
- Murdoch MacLeod, director, MacLeod Construction Limited, Lochgilphead, Argyll, Scotland.
- Maureen Milgram Forrest, founder chair and current chair, LeicesterHerDay Trust, Leicester.
- Kenneth Nelson, chief executive officer and company secretary, Larne Enterprise Development Company Ltd (LEDCOM), Larne, Northern Ireland.
- Frank Nicholson, former managing director, Vaux Breweries, Sunderland, Tyne and Wear.
- Ederyn Williams, director, Warwick Ventures, University of Warwick, Coventry, Warwickshire.

== 2011 ==
=== Lifetime Achievement ===
- Ronald Batty former chief executive, CDC Enterprise Agency, Durham, County Durham

=== Achievement in Enterprise Promotion ===
- Keith Bates, development consultant of Keith Bates Development Services, Bristol
- David Benstead director of Diodes Zetex Limited, Oldham, Greater Manchester
- Robert Blackburn director of the Small Business Research Centre, Kingston University, Kingston upon Thames, London
- Alison Brown, head of technology, director of specialism, Catcote School Business and Enterprise College, Hartlepool, County Durham
- Geoffrey Davies OBE, managing director Alamo Group Europe Ltd., vice president, Alamo Inc (US), Worcestershire
- Paul Davies, voluntary chief executive and business coach, Clowne Enterprise, Clowne, Derbyshire
- Victoria Lennox, founder and chair of trustees, National Consortium of University Entrepreneurs, London
- Susan Marlow, professor of entrepreneurship, De Montfort University, Leicester
- Alexander Pratt founder of Serious Brands Ltd., Bierton, Buckinghamshire
- Khalid Saifullah director of Star Tissue UK Ltd., Blackburn, Lancashire

== 2012 ==
=== Lifetime Achievement ===
- Carmel Gahan, director of Ross Carberry Ltd, Swansea, Wales

=== Achievement in Enterprise Promotion ===
- Steve Rawlings, chief executive of Lakehouse, Romford, Essex
- Brian Tanner, professor of physics and Dean of Knowledge Transfer, Durham University, Durham
- Sandy Ogilvie, retired chief executive, Project North East, Gateshead, Tyne and Weir
- Claire Ferris, Manager, Work West Enterprise Agency, Belfast, N. Ireland
- Steve Hoyle, managing director, Regenerate Pennine Lancashire Ltd, Accrington, Lancashire
- Elizabeth Tappenden, director, In To Biz Limited, The Isle of Wight
- Hugh Burnett OBE, DL, founder and chairman, Enterprise Works, Newhaven, East Sussex
- Russell Smith, chief executive officer, Business Boffins Ltd, Chinnor, Oxfordshire
- Chris Hunt, retired assistant head teacher and director, Stress in Teaching Limited, Bournemouth, Dorset
- Stuart Langworthy, Director of Business and Enterprise Specialism, Millbrook Academy, Brockworth, Gloucester

== 2013 ==
=== Lifetime Achievement ===
- Claire Dove MBE, chief executive, Blackburne House Group, Liverpool, Merseyside

=== Achievement in Enterprise Promotion ===
- Lady Cunningham, enterprise development coach, Ways into Successful Enterprise, Allerdale Borough Council, Workington, Cumbria
- Rajeeb Dey, CEO and founder, Enternships, London EC1
- Richard Gallafent, patent and trademark attorney, senior partner in Gallafents LLP, a private practice in London
- Michael Herd, executive director, The Sussex Innovation Centre, University of Sussex, Falmer, East Sussex
- Ian Smith, vice principal, Surbiton High School for Girls, Kingston upon Thames, Surrey
- Elizabeth Towns-Andrews, director of research and enterprise, University of Huddersfield, Huddersfield, West Yorkshire
- John Vernon, business advisor, Oxfordshire Business Enterprise, Banbury, Oxfordshire

== 2014 ==
=== Lifetime Achievement ===
- Wray Irwin Director of Employability and Engagement, University of Northampton

=== Achievement in Enterprise Promotion ===
- Christine Atkinson, Deputy Director of Entrepreneurship, University of South Wales, Pontypridd, Wales
- Timothy Barnes, director of enterprise operations and UCL advances, University College London; Founder of Citrus Saturday, London
- Eric Binns, enterprise officer, Calderdale Council, Halifax, West Yorkshire
- Mark Hart, chair, Small Business and Entrepreneurship, Aston University, Birmingham
- Guy Mucklow, chief executive officer, Postcode Anywhere (Europe) Ltd, Worcester
- Ann Stonehouse, chair, Assist Women's Network, Middlesbrough, North Yorkshire
- Jayne Taggert, chief executive, Causeway Enterprise Agency, Coleraine, County Londonderry, Northern Ireland

== 2015 ==
=== Lifetime Achievement ===
- Christopher Pichon The Wenta Business Centre

=== Achievement in Enterprise Promotion ===
- Steven Stokes of the University of Wales Trinity St Davids
- Margaret Gibson of Women's Enterprise Scotland
- Richard Holt of Creative Innovation Centre CIC
- Nelson Campbell Gray, business investor
- Lopa Patel digital media entrepreneur

== 2016 ==
=== Lifetime Achievement ===
- Dorothy Francis, MBE, Co-Director of Co-operative and Social Enterprise Development Agency (CASE), Leicester

=== Achievement in Enterprise Promotion ===
- Darrin M Disley, co-founder and chief executive officer of Horizon Discovery Group plc, Cambridge
- Bejay Mulenga, founder, Supa Tuck and Supa Academy, London
- Katherine Welch, founder, Social Enterprise Acumen CIC, Durham
- Claire Locke, DL, founder, Artigiano, entrepreneur and angel investor, vice-chair of The Prince's Trust Enterprise Fellowship, trustee, 1851 Trust, Portsmouth
