= UCL School of Management =

Business school of University College London

Coordinates: 51°30′18″N 00°01′10.6″W

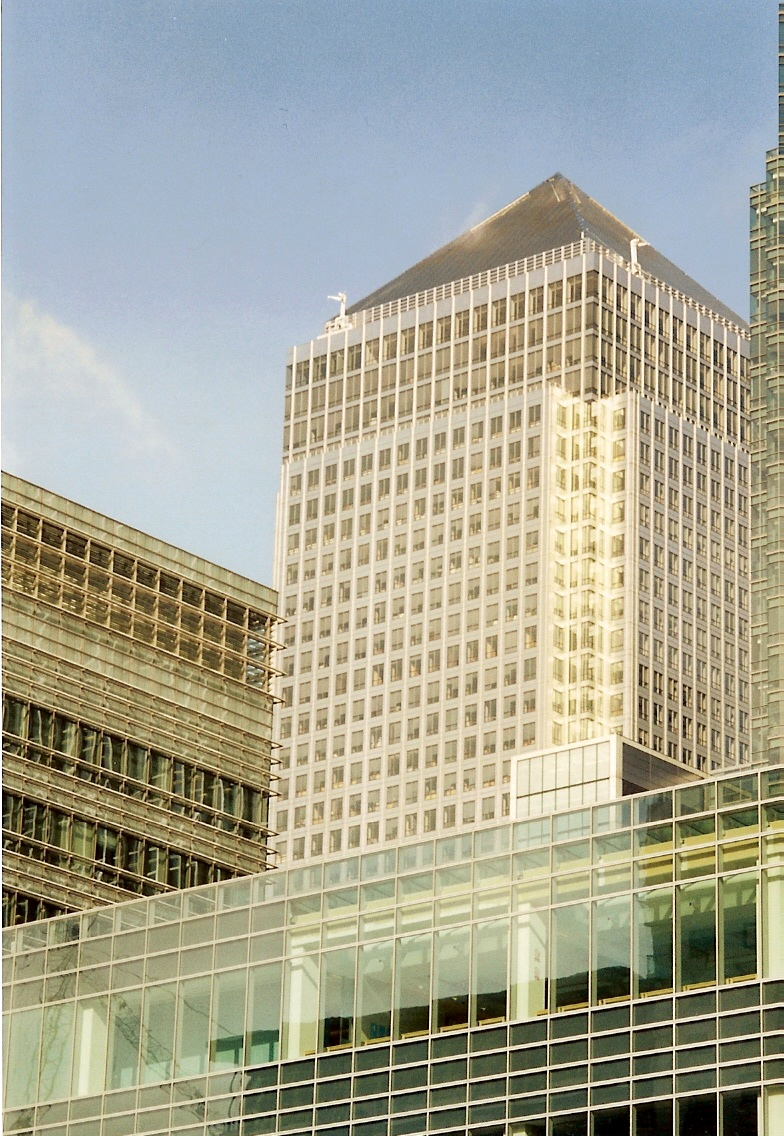
- UCL School of Management is based at the One Canada Square building in Canary Wharf, London
- Type: Business school
- Established: 2007
- Academic affiliation: University College London
- Director: Davide Ravasi
- Location: London, United Kingdom
- Campus: Urban
- Website: mgmt.ucl.ac.uk

The UCL School of Management is the business school of University College London (UCL). The School offers undergraduate, postgraduate, PhD and executive programmes in management, entrepreneurship, business analytics, business information systems, and finance.

== History ==
UCL's Department of Management Science and Innovation was established in 2007 along with UCL Advances, UCL's centre for business interaction and entrepreneurship. Steven C. Currall held the founding chair of the department. The department was established during a period of partnership between UCL and London Business School (LBS), both of which are constituent colleges of federal University of London and the department initially offered a master's degree in Technology Entrepreneurship and an undergraduate degree in Information Management for Business. The department grew significantly between 2007 and 2015 and expanded its offerings to include a master's in Management and bachelor's degree in Management Science.

In August, 2015, the Department of Management Science and Innovation was renamed the UCL School of Management, with Bert De Reyck as founding Director.

In July 2021, Professor Davide Ravasi was confirmed as the next director of the UCL School of Management with immediate effect for a period of five years in the first instance.

== Location ==
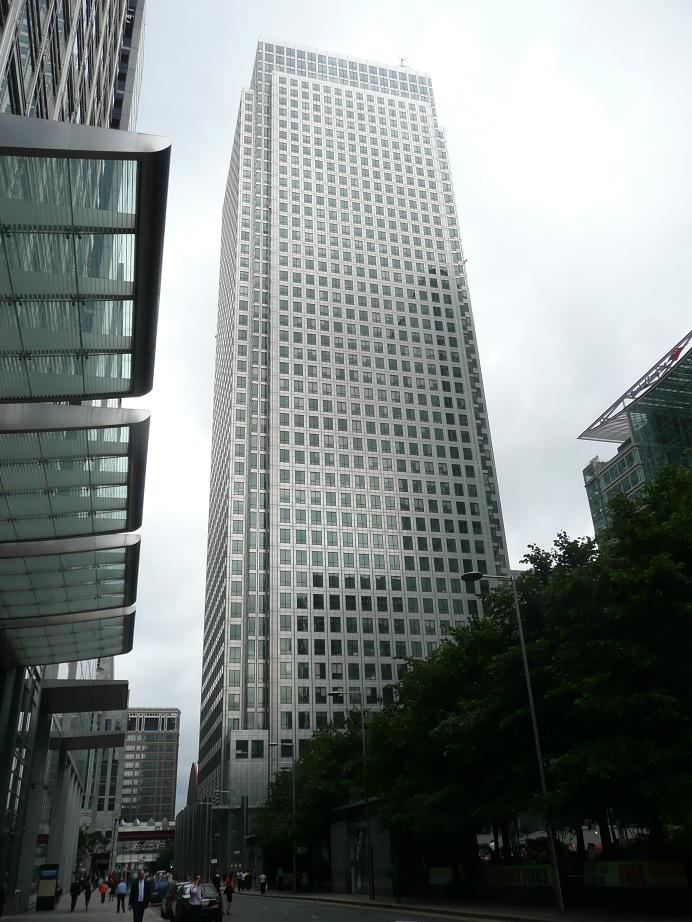
UCL School of Management is based on the 38th and 50th floors of One Canada Square building in Canary Wharf, London

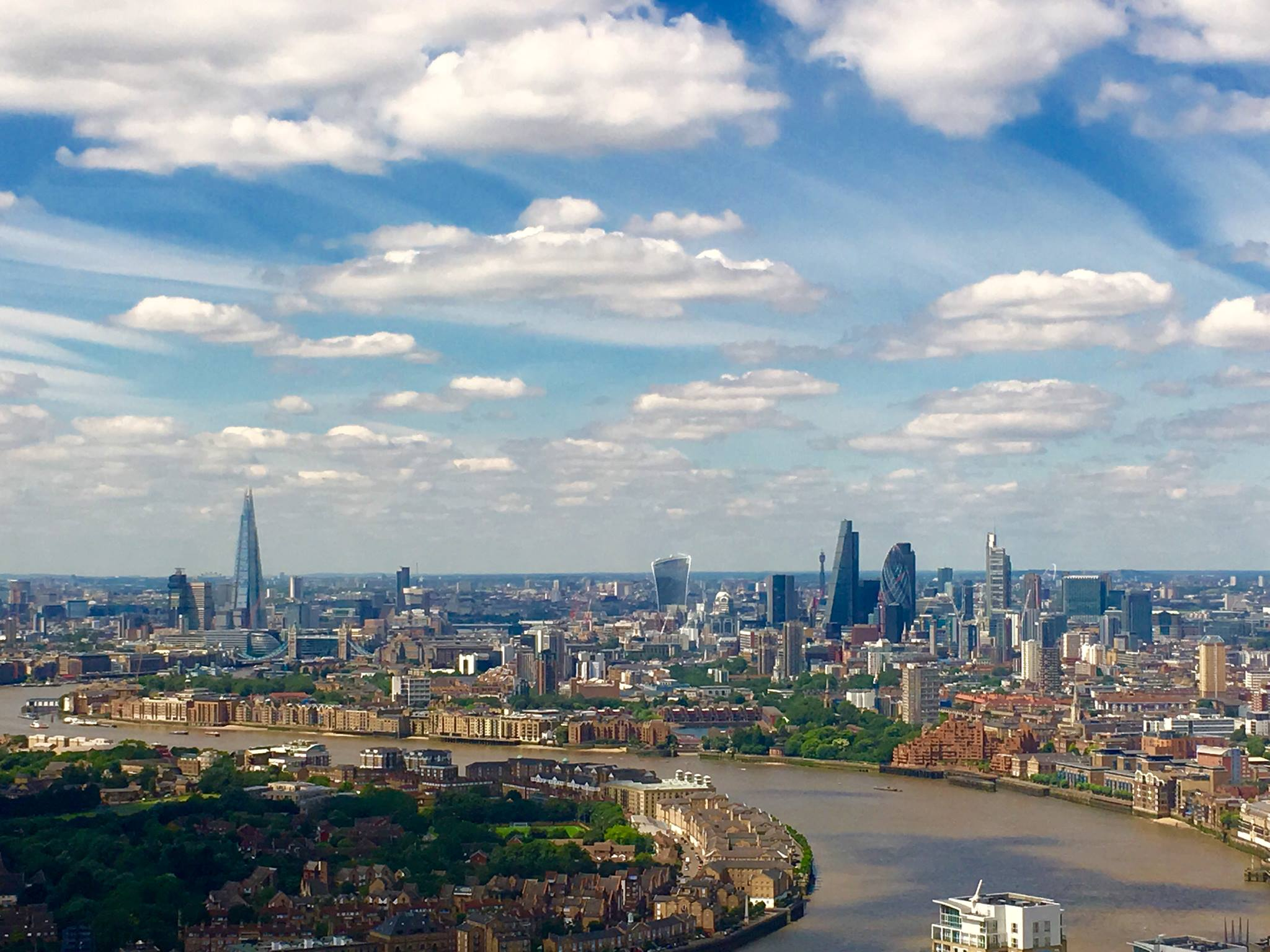
View of Central London from UCL School of Management

The UCL School of Management is located on Levels 38 and 50 (~194m up) of One Canada Square in Canary Wharf financial estate in the London Docklands. The school is located in the same building as Level39, Europe’s biggest financial technology accelerator. The school, working in association with UCL Advances, is closely linked to East London Tech City, the third-largest technology startup cluster in the world. The school also has a base on the main UCL campus in Bloomsbury, where the School's undergraduate programmes are based.

== Research ==
The UCL School of Management currently comprises 25 research faculty and 50 teaching faculty that focus in areas of Organizational Behavior, Innovation, Entrepreneurship, Strategy, Operations Management, Marketing and Analytics. In the UK government’s 2014 Research Excellence Framework (REF), 55 per cent of the school's research output was judged to be "world-leading", and it ranked second in UK (after LBS) for world leading (4*) research output. Martin Kilduff is the founding Deputy Director of Research of the school.

UCL departments in closely related fields of computer science, economics, planning and psychology, were ranked at the top for research in UK in the 2014 REF assessment. Moreover, in the REF assessment, UCL had the largest output of world leading (4*) research in STEM (Panel A and B) and social sciences (Panel C) among UK universities and it ranked at the top for overall research strength.

=== History of management research at UCL ===
Although management has recently emerged as specific area of research at UCL, some prominent figures in closely related fields were faculty members at UCL. Karl Pearson who founded the world's first statistics department at UCL in 1911, is regarded as the father of modern statistics. Pearson's mentor and polymath, Francis Galton, who founded the erstwhile Galton Laboratory of UCL, is considered to be the father of psychometrics and differential psychology. Several important contributions to areas such as statistics and evolutionary game theory were made by figures like Kirstine Smith, Ronald Fisher, J.B.S. Haldane and John Maynard Smith associated with the lab. In the field of experimental psychology, several faculty members of UCL's Faculty of Brain Sciences like James Sully, Charles Spearman and Tim Shallice made noted contributions to advance the field. The Bartlett, was the first architecture and built environment school established in the UK in 1841 and since, many of its faculty members like Patrick Abercrombie and Peter Hall have made notable contributions to the field of planning. Moreover, 1922 Nobel Laureate and faculty member of UCL Medical School, Archibald Hill is considered to be one of the founders of Operations Research.

== Reputation and ranking ==
Its master's program in management has around twenty applications made for every place. The school's master's program in technology entrepreneurship has spun out several successful startups.

== Student life ==
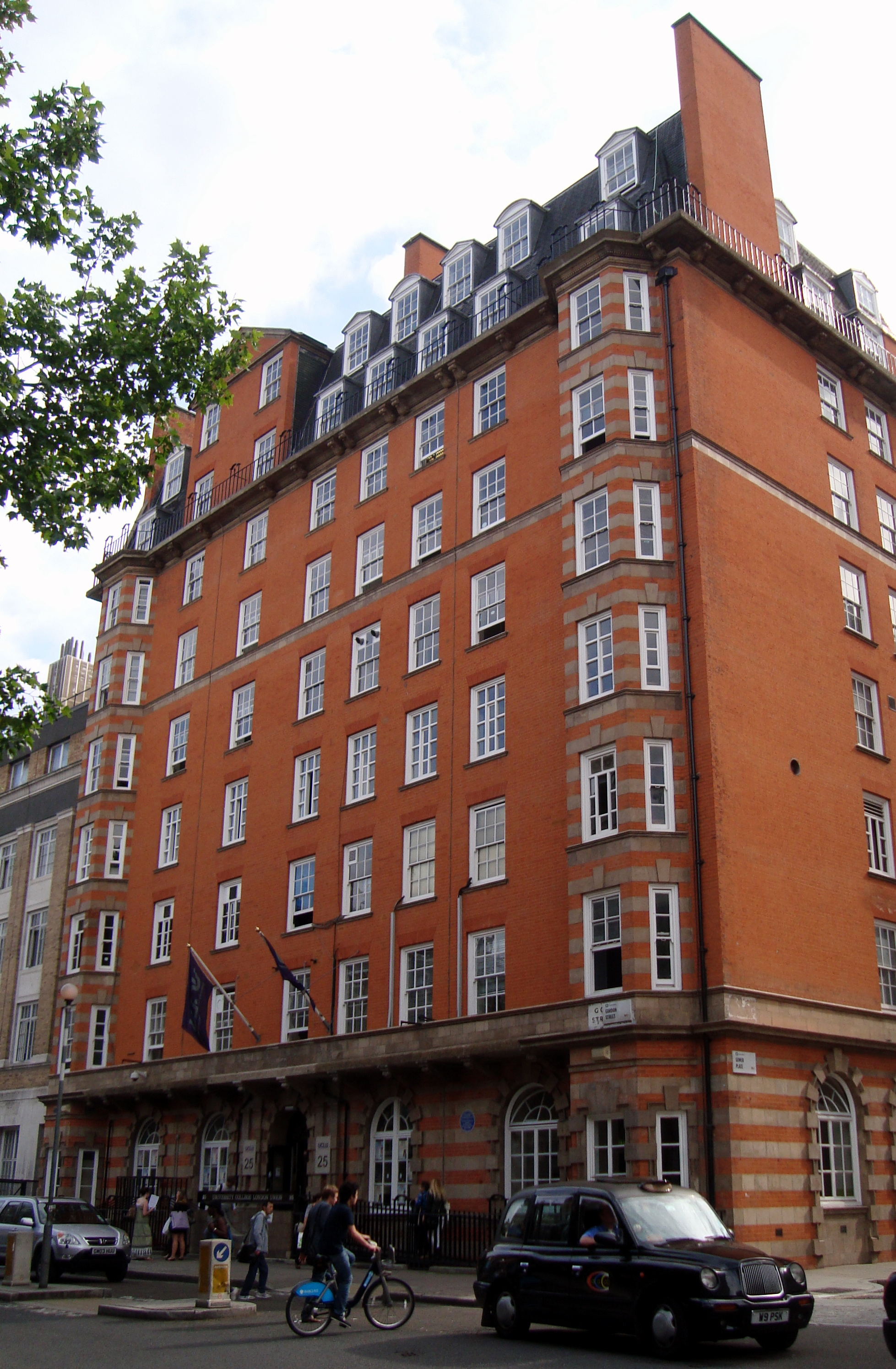
The main UCL Union building situated on Gordon Street

All students of UCL are automatically members of University College London Union which has over 200 clubs and societies covering a wide range of sporting, cultural and artistic interests. Societies like UCLU Business Society, Economics and Finance Society and Entrepreneur Society specifically cater to students interested in entrepreneurship, business, economics and finance.

UCL Advances, which has close links to School of Management, runs series of programs like the Bright Ideas Awards, Citrus Saturday, London Entrepreneurs' Challenge and Entrepreneurship Guest Lectures to engage students interested in entrepreneurship, and offers incubation programs to support start-ups in East London Tech City and support to small businesses through programs like Goldman Sachs 10,000 Small Businesses. UCL Advances, along with UCL Business and UCL Consultants, is part of UCL Enterprise, which provides structures for engaging with business for commercial and societal benefit via entrepreneurship, technology transfer (see UCL Business) and consulting.

UCLU has over 50 sporting clubs and a fitness centre in Bloomsbury, a sports centre in Somers Town and a 90-acre athletics ground in Shenley which until 1998 was also used by Arsenal F.C. Student Central (erstwhile University of London Union) also provides sporting, fitness, cultural and recreational facilities including central London's largest swimming pool, accessible to all University of London students.
