= Charles Ford =

Charles Ford may refer to:

== Government ==
- Charles Ford (British politician) (1845–1918), British politician
- Charles Ford (California politician), member of the 1861–62 California State Assembly
- Charles Ford (Oklahoma politician) (1931–2021), American politician
- Charles A. Ford (born 1950), American ambassador to Honduras
- Charles A. Ford (Virginia politician) (1855–1933), Shenandoah Baptist leader, merchant and member of the Virginia House of Delegates
- Charles Wilbraham Watson Ford (1896–1972), officer in the British Indian Army during World War II

== Sports ==
- Charlie Ford (American football) (born 1948), cornerback
- Charlie Ford (golfer) (born 1985), English golfer

== Media ==
- Charles E. Ford (1899–1942), newsreel and film producer and director
- Charles Henri Ford (1908–2002), American poet and artist, editor of the Surrealist magazine View
- Charles Ford (OITNB), a fictional character in Orange Is the New Black
- Charles Ford (film historian) (1908–1989), Franco-Belgian writer, film historian, journalist, radio and television producer

== Other ==
- Charles Ford (outlaw) (1857–1884), member of the James Gang
- Charles Ford (trade unionist) (1923–2000), British trade union leader
- Charles Edmund Ford (1912–1999), English biologist
- Charles Gerard Ford, Northern Ireland businessman
- Charles Reginald Ford (1880–1972), New Zealand explorer, land agent, and architect
