= Paleontography =

Paleontography (from Ancient Greek παλαιός “old”, ὤν "being", γραφή "I write") is the formal description of fossil remains. It is a subdiscipline of paleontology. The term has been in use in this sense for more than a hundred and fifty years, for example by the Palaeontographical Society. A paleontographer (or palaeontographer) is anyone who works in the field.

The term has recently been adopted for someone who uses medical imaging technology to scan fossils. Mainly use CT scan or a non-invasive scan technology. Sean Mclain Brown, journalist at the Sierra Madre Mountain News, coined the term in February 1999 in the Sierra Madre Mountain News (Volume 2, issue 30). Inventor/Software engineer Lee Schiel of Early Response Imaging and Doctors Michael Smith and John Nesson of Arcadia Methodist Hospital were the first pioneers of this field in the late 1990s.
