= James Scott Bowerbank =

British naturalist and palaeontologist (1797–1877)

James Scott Bowerbank FRS
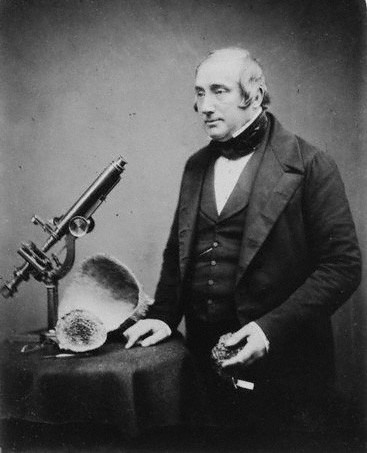
- James Scott Bowerbank
- Born: 14 July 1797; Bishopsgate, London
- Died: 8 March 1877 (aged 79); St Leonards-on-Sea
- Scientific career
- Fields: naturalist

James Scott Bowerbank FRS (14 July 1797 – 8 March 1877) was a British naturalist and palaeontologist.

== Biography ==
Bowerbank was born in Bishopsgate, London, and succeeded in conjunction with his brother to his father's distillery, in which he was actively engaged until 1847.

In early years astronomy and natural history, especially botany, engaged much of his attention; he became an enthusiastic worker at the microscope, studying the structure of shells, corals, moss agates, and flints. He also formed an extensive collection of fossils. The organic remains of the London Clay attracted particular attention, and about the year 1836 he and six other workers founded The London Clay Club – the members comprising Dr Bowerbank, Frederick E. Edwards (1799–1875), author of The Eocene Mollusca (Palaeontograph. Soc.), Searles Valentine Wood, John Morris, Alfred White, N. T. Wetherell, surgeon of Highgate (1800–1875), and James De Carle Sowerby. In 1840, Bowerbank published A History of the Fossil Fruits and Seeds of the London Clay, and two years later he was elected Fellow of the Royal Society.

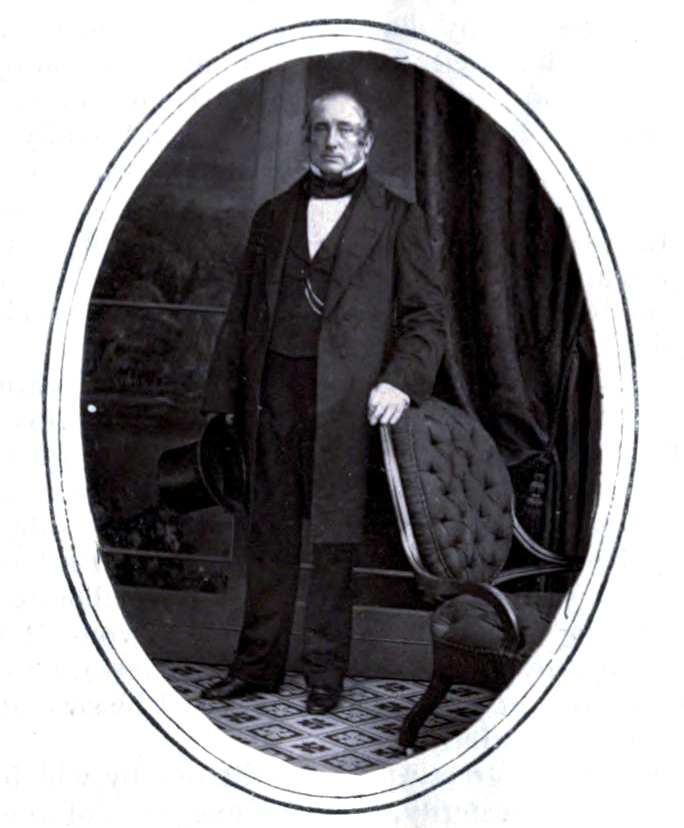

In 1847 he suggested the establishment of a society for the publication of undescribed British Fossils, and thus originated the Palaeontographical Society. From 1844 until 1864 he did much to encourage a love of natural science by being at home every Monday evening at his residence in Park Street, Islington, and afterwards in Highbury Grove, where the treasures of his museum, his 4 microscopes, and his personal assistance were at the service of every earnest student. He became specially interested in the study of sponges, and he was author of A Monograph of the British Spongiadae in 4 vols., published by the Ray Society, 1864–1882. He retired in 1864 to St Leonards-on-Sea, where he died on 8 March 1877.
