= UWSP =

UWSP may refer to:

- United Wa State Party, a Burmese political organization
- University of Wisconsin–Stevens Point, a public university in Stevens Point, Wisconsin
- University of Warwick Science Park, a university-based science park in the United Kingdom
