= Beverley Pold =

British businesswoman

Beverley Pold (Bev Pold), is the Business Development/Policy manager, Chwarae Teg/Fair Play, Cardiff.

In 2009, she was awarded the Queen's Award for Enterprise Promotion. In 2014 she was nominated for the St. David's Awards Enterprise Award.

Pold is vice-chair of rural enterprise agency Antur Teifi, contributor to the Women's Enterprise UK Policy group and member of University of South Wales WAVE (Women Adding Value to the Economy) advisory group.
