= Gilbert Jessop (cricketer, born 1906) =

English cricketer

Personal information
- Full name: Gilbert Laird Osborne Jessop
- Born: 6 September 1906; Kensington, London, England
- Died: 16 January 1990 (aged 83); Lambeth, London, England
- Batting: Right-handed
- Bowling: Right-arm off break
- Relatives: Gilbert Jessop senior (father); Osman Jessop (uncle)

Domestic team information
- Years: Team
- 1929: Marylebone Cricket Club
- 1933: Hampshire
- 1936: Cambridgeshire
- 1939–1952: Dorset

Career statistics
Competition	First-class
Matches	4
Runs scored	86
Batting average	12.28
100s/50s	–/–
Top score	29
Balls bowled	126
Wickets	1
Bowling average	67.00
5 wickets in innings	–
10 wickets in match	–
Best bowling	1/16
Catches/stumpings	2/–
- Source: Cricinfo, 2 March 2010

Gilbert Laird Osborne Jessop (6 September 1906 — 16 January 1990) was an English first-class cricketer and clergyman.

== Education and first-class cricket ==
The son of the Test cricketer Gilbert Jessop, he was born at Kensington in September 1906. Jessop was educated at Weymouth College, where he represented the college cricket team from 1922 to 1924, having success as an off break bowler, taking 97 wickets for the college. From there, he matriculated to Christ's College, Cambridge. He played in the freshman match at Cambridge, performing well enough to be afforded a further two trial matches for Cambridge University Cricket Club, but he did not impress enough in these matches to warrant selection for the Cambridge eleven. However, Jessop did make his debut in first-class cricket for the Marylebone Cricket Club against Wales at Lord's in 1929. Having gained his Bachelor of Arts, Jessop proceeded to Ridley Hall, Cambridge prior to taking Holy Orders in the Church of England. He undertook his early ecclesiastical duties as curate at Havant, Having completed his residency qualification to play for Hampshire, Jessop made three first-class appearances for the county in 1933, playing against the touring West Indians and twice in the County Championship against Sussex and Middlesex. He scored 89 runs in his four first-class matches at an average of 12.28, with a highest score of 29. His only first-class wicket was that of Sussex's James Langridge.

== Later ecclesiastical career ==
Jessop relocated to Cambridge in 1934, where he took up the post of chaplain at Queens' College, Cambridge and was curate at St Andrew the Great in Cambridge. Whilst resident at Cambridge, he played minor counties cricket for Cambridgeshire in 1936, making five appearances in the Minor Counties Championship. Later in 1936, he was appointed vicar at Fordington, Dorset. In 1939, he made his debut for Dorset in the Minor Counties Championship. During the Second World War, Jessop was a chaplain in the Royal Navy Volunteer Reserve. Following the war, he returned to playing minor counties cricket for Dorset, doing so until 1952, making a total of 42 appearances for the county in the Minor Counties Championship.

In 1958, he was appointed vicar of Tacarigua in British Trinidad, an appointment he held for two years. Following that, he held leadership roles at Boy's Schools in Jamaica between 1961 and 1965, before being appointed rector at Annotto Bay in Jamaica in 1966. He returned to England in 1968 to assume the rectorship of Kegworth, Leicestershire. His appointment there lasted until 1972, when he became master of St John's Hospital, Bath. Jessop died on 16 January 1990 at St Thomas' Hospital, London. His uncle, Osman Jessop, also played first-class cricket.
