= Simon Denny =

Simon Denny may refer to:

- Simon Denny (artist) (born 1982), New Zealand-born artist
- Simon Denny (professor), English academic
- Simon Baker (born 1969), Australian-American actor known earlier in his life as Simon Baker-Denny
