= Weymouth College =

College in Weymouth, England

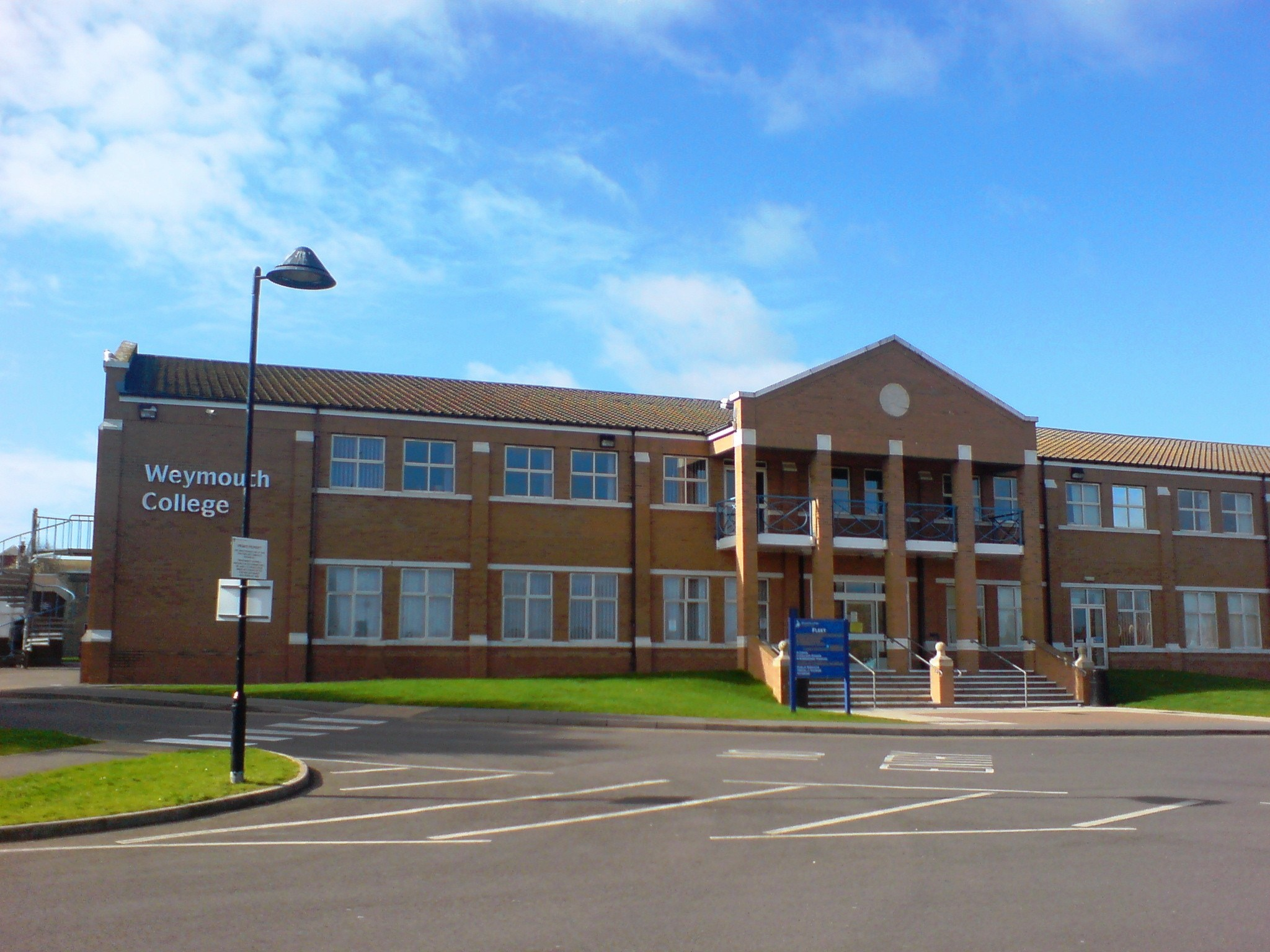

Location
- Cranford Avenue; Weymouth, Dorset, DT4 7LQ; England; 50.623°N 2.452°W

Information
- Type: FE College
- Established: 1985
- Local authority: Dorset
- Department for Education URN: 130653 Tables
- Ofsted: Reports
- Principal and CEO: Jasper Allen-Denton
- Gender: Mixed
- Age: 16+
- Former name: Weymouth Grammar School
- Website: Official website

Weymouth College is a further education college located in Weymouth, England. The college has over 4,000 students, studying on a wide range of practical and academic courses in many subjects. The college is part of The University of Plymouth Colleges network.

The college previously had a second site on Newstead Road, but consolidated to a single main campus at Cranford Avenue in 2000.

There was a private school (Eng: "public school") of the same name from 1862 to 1940 in Weymouth.

== History ==
=== Grammar school ===
This site was opened in 1914 as Weymouth Secondary School, which in 1927 became known as Weymouth Grammar School. In 1939, the school began sharing this site with South Dorset Technical College. In the 1960s, the school moved to new premises in Chickerell Road, leaving the technical college with sole use of the site. The grammar school was co-educational with around 1,050 boys and girls, administered by the South Dorset Divisional Executive of Dorset Education Committee.

=== Merger and formation ===
1985 saw the creation of the modern Weymouth College, a tertiary college, with the merging of the technical college with Weymouth College (the former Weymouth College site became known as the Cranford Avenue campus).

=== New site ===
In 2001, the Newstead Road site was sold for housing development, and all students based there were transferred to new facilities at the Cranford Avenue campus, creating the college as it exists today.

Weymouth College has expanded its provision beyond its traditional curriculum offering. A sports centre and gym facility for public use was opened at the Cranford Avenue site, with the college additionally taking over the operation of the former Weymouth Sports Club site on Dorchester Road, now renamed as Redlands Community Sports Hub.

Weymouth College was merged with the land-based college Kingston Maurward College in 2024.

== Alumni ==
- Mark Hix (born 1962), chef
- Karen Arnold (born 1964), businesswoman

=== Weymouth Grammar School ===
- Charles Bawden, professor of Mongolian from 1970-84 at the School of Oriental and African Studies
- Brian Carter, former professional footballer.
- Mark Constantine, entrepreneur & co-founder of Lush
- Michael Robert House (1930-2002) geologist and palaeontologist
- Prof Graham Hutchings, chemist, Regius Professor of Chemistry since 2016 at Cardiff University
- Prof Nick Jennings, Vice-Chancellor and President Loughborough University
- Michael Middleton (priest)
- Gilbert Jessop, cricketer
