= Brian Dunsby =

British businessman (1940–2025)

Brian Dunsby OBE
- Born: Brian Leslie Dunsby; 22 January 1940
- Died: 4 January 2025 (aged 84); Harrogate, North Yorkshire, England
- Occupation: Businessman
- Awards: Queen's Award for Enterprise Promotion (2008)

Brian Leslie Dunsby, OBE (22 January 1940 – 4 January 2025) was a British businessman.

He was the principal of Perlex Associates, Harrogate, North Yorkshire. He was the chief executive of the non-profit Yorkshire Business Market LTD. He founded a perlite business which he sold to a major agricultural supplier. Afterwards, he channelled much of his energies through Perlex Associates, which outsourced organizational tasks helping other entrepreneurs to create and grow new businesses.

== Business career ==
In 1992, Dunsby became Chief Executive of the Institute of Business Advisers.

Dunsby was elected director of the International Council of Small Business in 1999, organizing the 2003 World Conference.

In 2001, he was elected director of the UK Institute for Small Business and Entrepreneurship. He was also organizing the International Entrepreneurship Conferences from 2004 until 2008.

During the 2001–2006 period, he was on the governing body of the World Association of SMEs. Dunsby was the Chief Executive of the Harrogate Chamber of Commerce from 2006 to 2016.

Dunsby organized the Harrogate Christmas Market in 2013, an award-winning event put on by Perlex Associates and the Harrogate Chamber of Commerce, under the auspices of the non-profit Yorkshire Business Market Ltd.

Dunsby was the secretary of the John Innes Manufacturers Association (JIMA), until he retired from that role after 32 years of involvement with the organization in 2010.

== Personal life and death ==
Dunsby was born on 22 January 1940. He died at home in Harrogate, on 4 January 2025, aged 84.

== Awards and nominations ==
In 2008, he was awarded the Queen's Award for Enterprise Promotion.

He was appointed OBE in the 2017 Birthday Honours.
