= Maureen Milgram Forrest =

British businesswoman (born 1938)

- Born: 1 February 1938; London
- Died: 1 March 2013 (aged 75); Victoria, British Columbia
- Other names: Lillian Maureen Bernice Forrest
- Occupation(s): Journalist, theatrical director, charity director
- Known for: Awarded the Queen's Award for Enterprise Promotion (2010)

Maureen Milgram Forrest (1 February 1938 - 1 March 2013) was a British co-founder of LeicesterHERday Trust and the original project director for the BRIT School in Croydon, London. She was also known as Lillian Maureen Bernice Forrest.

== Life ==
Born in London on 1 February 1938, Forrest emigrated to Toronto with her parents in the 1950s. She attended the University of Toronto, gaining a graduate degree in Leisure Service Administration. She later moved to Victoria, British Columbia, where she produced the musical The Wonder of it All at the Royal British Columbia Museum. In 1987, she was awarded Victoria's Woman of the Year.

She returned to live in England in the late 1980s, where she was initially employed by the Leicester Mercury newspaper. She was director of the Ken Chamberlain Trust.

In the late 1990s she was artistic director and chief executive of the Brewhouse Arts Centre in Burton upon Trent, Staffordshire.

In 2009 Forrest was a judge for the Leicester First award, and presented it to Stuart Berry at the Walkers Stadium along with footballer Alan Birchenall.

She moved back to Victoria in 2010. That year she was awarded the Queen's Award for Enterprise Promotion.

She died in Victoria, British Columbia, on 1 March 2013.

== Works ==
- The INA Carlyle Winners of the Poetry Digest Love Poetry Competition 1994 (ed) (With Alan Forrest) ISBN 978-1-85473-012-1
