= Martin Kilduff =

British academic

Martin Kilduff is a British academic. He is the Professor of Management and Director of Research at the UCL School of Management.

== Early life ==
Martin Kilduff grew up in the Camden Town area of London, England. He attended Primrose Hill primary school followed by Quintin grammar school. His higher education was pursued in the U.S. He received his BA and MBA from Washington State University and his MS and PhD from Cornell University.

== Career ==
Kilduff was an assistant professor of Organizational Behavior at INSEAD, professor of management at Pennsylvania State University, the Kleberg/King Ranch Centennial Professor of Management at the University of Texas at Austin, and the Diageo Professor of Management Studies at the University of Cambridge. He is a professor of management at the UCL School of Management.

From 2006 to 2008, Kilduff was editor of Academy of Management Review and was also associate editor of Administrative Science Quarterly for two periods totalling nine years. He was also active on the five-year executive committee track of the Organization and Management Theory Division of the Academy of Management including serving as Division Chair 2021–22. In 2025, he was inducted into the Fellows Group of the Academy of Management His research focuses on social networks and includes the co-authored books A Connected World: Social Networks and Organizations (Cambridge University Press: 2023); Social Networks and Organizations (Sage: 2003); and Interpersonal networks in organizations: Cognition, personality, dynamics and culture (Cambridge University Press: 2008). His research relates personality to network structure (e.g., Journal of Applied Psychology, 2008), perceived networks to actual networks (e.g., Organizational Behavior and Human Decision Processes, 2008), and proposes new theory concerning scientific innovation (e.g., Academy of Management Review, 2011).

== Works ==
Selected journal articles:

- Kilduff, M., Wang, K., Lee, S. Y., Tsai, W., Chuang, Y. T., & Tsai, F. S. 2024. Hiding and seeking knowledge-providing ties from rivals: A strategic perspective on network perceptions. Academy of Management Journal, 67: 1207–1233.
- Mehra, A., Kilduff, M., & Brass, D. 2001. The social networks of high and low self-monitors: Implications for workplace performance. Administrative Science Quarterly, 46: 121–146.
- Balkundi, P., & Kilduff, M. 2005. The ties that lead: A social network approach to leadership. Leadership Quarterly, 16: 941–961.
- Kilduff, M., & Krackhardt, D. 1994. Bringing the individual back in: A structural analysis of the internal market for reputation in organizations. Academy of Management Journal, 37: 87–108.
- Kilduff, M., Angelmar, R., & Mehra, A. 2000. Top management team diversity and firm performance: Examining the role of cognitions. Organization Science, 11: 21–34.
- Kilduff, M., & Brass, D. J. 2010. Organizational social network research: Core ideas and key debates. Academy of Management Annals, 4: 317–357.
- Mehra, A., Kilduff, M., & Brass, D.J. 1998. At the margins: A distinctiveness approach to the social identity and social networks of underrepresented groups. Academy of Management Journal, 41: 441–452.

Selected book chapters:

- Kilduff, M., & Balkundi, P. 2011. A network approach to leader cognition and effectiveness. In A. Bryman, K. Grint, B. Jackson, & M. Uhl-Bien (Eds.), Sage Handbook of Leadership: 118–135. London: Sage.
- Kilduff, M., Crossland, C., & Tsai, W. 2008. Pathways of opportunity in dynamic organizational networks. In M. Uhl-Bien & R. Marion (Eds.), Complexity leadership: Part 1: conceptual foundations: 83- 99. Charlotte, NC: Information Age Publishing.
- Kilduff, M., & Kelemen, M. 2004. Deconstructing discourse. In, D. Grant, C. Hardy, C. Oswick & L. Putnam (Eds.), The Sage Handbook of organizational discourse: 259–272. London: Sage.
- Kilduff, M., & Kelemen, M. 2003. Bringing ideas back in: Eclecticism and discovery in organizational studies. Research in the Sociology of Organizations, 21: 89–109.
- Kilduff, M. 2000. Hegemonic masculinity and organizational behavior. In R.T. Golembiewski (Ed.), Handbook of organizational behavior, 2nd. ed.: 599–609. New York: Marcel Dekker.
- Kilduff, M. 1993. The reproduction of inertia in multinational corporations. In S. Ghoshal & E. Westney (Eds.), Organization theory and the multinational corporation: 259–274. New York: St. Martin's Press.
