= Lopa Patel =

Digital entrepreneur

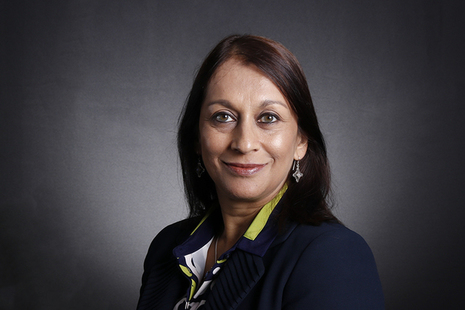
Lopa Patel

Lopa Patel, MBE, is a digital entrepreneur. Her parents were shopkeepers who arrived in Britain as refugees from Kenya in the 1970s. After graduating BSc from UMIST in 1986 and pursuing a graduate traineeship at ICI, Patel took over a printing business which she developed into the database management and direct marketing company DMS Direct. She went on to found Redhotcurry.com (a recipe-sharing site that developed into a South Asian lifestyle portal) and the online shopping site TheRedhotshop.com. She is also the founder and CEO of Diversity UK, a think tank that studies and promotes diversity in Britain. In 2009 she was appointed to the board of Becta (British Educational Communications and Technology Agency). In 2014 she set up the online news and lifestyle publisher New Asian Post.

Patel was one of eight media experts appointed to a panel to advise on a review of the BBC Charter in 2015.

== Awards ==
Patel won an Asian Woman of the Year Award in 2005 for her work as a new media entrepreneur, an achievement showcased in a Department of Work and Pensions report to Parliament on equality of opportunity. In 2009 she was awarded an MBE for "services to the creative industries". In 2015 she became the first Asian woman to receive the Queen's Award for Enterprise Promotion. She was also a finalist for Businesswoman of the Year in the English Asian Business Awards.

In 2017 she was awarded an honorary doctorate by The Open University "for her exceptional contribution to diversity in the STEM sector".
