= University of Plymouth Academic Partnerships =

- Type: Public
- Established: 2004
- Parent institution: University of Plymouth
- Location: Plymouth, International
- Campus: Various
- Website: www.plymouth.ac.uk/business-partners/global-academic-partnerships

University of Plymouth Academic Partnerships is a partnership between the University of Plymouth, local colleges, and universities to deliver a range of higher education courses in the UK, as well as the Channel Islands, and at international institutions.

== History ==
The University of Plymouth Academic Partnerships began as a network of local colleges in 1989 with the Polytechnic South West. The polytechnic entered into partnership agreements with local FE colleges in Cornwall, Devon and Somerset to extend the provision of HE opportunities.

The initial intake was 450 students. By 1992, the polytechnic had become the University of Plymouth, and the network was devised as the University of Plymouth Colleges Network (UPC) in 2003.

In 2004, the UPC was launched as a faculty within the university with its own Dean, and by 2007, student numbers had reached 9,500 students.

=== Present day ===
UPC has expanded international and was subsequently replaced by an international 'Academic Institutions Partnership' scheme ran and managed by the university.

Students studying at partner colleges in the UK have access to the University of Plymouth's library. All students at partner colleges have limited access to the University of Plymouth's student services, and full access to the online careers and employability system.

== Members ==
Region		Academic Partner
Europe	Channel Islands	Highlands College in Saviour, Jersey
Europe	Greece	Business College of Athens (BCA); Hellenic National Defence College (HNDC)
Europe	Switzerland	International Institute in Geneva
Europe	United Kingdom	Bridgwater and Taunton College; BCNO Group: The British College of Osteopathic Medicine (BCOM), London AND The European School of Osteopathy (ESO), Kent; City of Bristol College; City College Plymouth; Cornwall College in St Austell; Dartington Trust, Totnes; Exeter College; MWS - HMTU, HMS Drake; GSM London; Institute for Export and International Trade, Peterborough; MLA College, Plymouth; Petroc in Barnstaple; RILA Institute of Health Sciences, London; South Devon College in Paignton; Strode College in Street; Truro and Penwith College; Weymouth College
Asia		HKU School of Professional and Continuing Education (HKU SPACE), Hong Kong; National School of Business Management, Sri Lanka; Peninsula College Malaysia, Malaysia
