= Beverly Hurley =

British businesswoman

Beverly Hurley CBE is the Chief Executive, YTKO Group, Cambridge. In 2010, she was awarded the Queen's Award for Enterprise Promotion. Hurley served on the EEDA board from 14 December 2007 until August 2010.

Hurley was appointed Commander of the Most Excellent Order of the British Empire (CBE) in the 2014 New Year Honours for services to enterprise.
