= David Kirby (business professor) =

British academic (born 1945)

David Anthony Kirby FRSA (born 2 April 1945) is a British academic working in the area of business administration and entrepreneurship.

From 2007, Kirby served as the founding Dean of the Faculty of Business Administration, Economics and Political Science at the British University in Egypt.

== Education ==
Kirby studied Geography at Durham University (BA, 1966) and completed a PhD in Social Sciences at the same institution (1969), where he worked concurrently as a part-time tutor within the Department of Geography.

== Career ==
He is currently Vice President (Research, Enterprise and Community Service) in the British University in Egypt, where he has been employed since 2007, initially as Founding Dean and Vodafone Chair of Business Administration. Prior to that appointment he was a professor of entrepreneurship at the University of Surrey in Guildford, UK, having held the UK's first chair in Entrepreneurship at the University of Durham in 1989. He is a pioneer of entrepreneurship education in the UK and in 2006 was awarded the Queen's Award for Enterprise Promotion.
