= Charlotte Young =

Charlotte Elizabeth Young OBE is the chairwoman of board of trustees of the School for Social Entrepreneurs in London, since 2006. In 2009, she was awarded the Queen's Award for Enterprise Promotion.

Formerly Young was dean of management at the University of Westminster, director of management development with Thorn EMI, and in 1990 co-founded YSC, the largest international business psychology consultancy.

Young was appointed Officer of the Order of the British Empire (OBE) in the 2022 Birthday Honours for services to social enterprise.
