= Anne Duncan =

British businesswoman

Anne Duncan, is the chief executive of Ecospeed Marine. In 2007, she was awarded the Queen's Award for Enterprise Promotion. From 2000 to 2009, she was CEO of Yellowfin, a company based in Southampton, which developed the Yellowfin Variable Surface Drive marine propulsion system.
