= Nicholas O'Shiel =

Northern Ireland businessman and civil servant

Dr Nicholas O'Shiel is the chief executive of the Omagh Enterprise Company Ltd, Omagh, County Tyrone, Northern Ireland. He has been the chair of the governing body of South West College since 2019. In 2008, he was awarded the Queen's Award for Enterprise Promotion - the only honorary awardee that year.
