= Bridgwater and Taunton College =

Coordinates: 51°07′53″N 2°59′16″W

Location
- Bath Road; Bridgwater, Somerset, TA6 4PZ; England

Information
- Type: Sixth form and further education college
- Established: 1973
- Local authority: Somerset
- Department for Education URN: 130803 Tables
- Ofsted: Reports
- Chairman of Governing Body: Derek Randall
- Principal: Andy Berry
- Gender: Co-educational
- Website: btc.ac.uk

Bridgwater and Taunton College is a further education college based in the heart of Somerset, England, with main centres in Bridgwater, Taunton and Cannington. It educates approximately 3000 students between the ages of 16–18 in academic and vocational programmes in addition to several thousand part-time or mature students. The college was founded in 1973, although the history of its predecessor institutions dates to 1891.

After a merger with Cannington College in September 2004, the college expanded its curriculum of full-time and part-time courses for school leavers, adults, university level students, the business community and students from overseas. In 2016, Bridgwater College merged with Somerset College to become Bridgwater & Taunton College and launched University Centre Somerset.

The college offers courses from entry level through higher education. In addition to A-Levels and BTEC qualifications, the college offers the International Baccalaureate Diploma Programme. The college has links with the University of Plymouth by way of the University of Plymouth Colleges network, Bournemouth University, Oxford Brookes University and is part of the Wessex Partnership, in association with Bath Spa University.

In 2012 the college became the sponsor of a Multi Academy Trust named Bridgwater and Taunton College Trust. The college aims to support the development of schools within the Trust.

== History ==
Bridgwater College was founded in its present form in 1973. The college was created by the reconstitution of its predecessor, the Bridgwater Technical College, to provide Bridgwater with a sixth-form and further education college. The college has occupied buildings at its present site in Bath Road since 1978.

=== Bridgwater Technical College ===
Through the Technical College the roots of tertiary education in Bridgwater can be traced to the establishment of the Bridgwater School of Art in George Street in 1860. A second art school was established in 1888 in Queen Street. This became the Bridgwater Art and Technical School after its relocation to Lonsdale House in Blake Street in 1891. The school, which had been renamed as the Art and Technical Institute since at least 1931, was renamed again in 1958 when it became the Bridgwater Technical College. During the following two years, the college expanded with the acquisition of premises in Mount Street, Queen Street and new buildings in Broadway, where it continued until the college acquired its current name in 1973. Further buildings in Park Road were occupied from 1975, but by 1988 most of the college's departments were located at its buildings in Bath Road.

Cannington College, the local agricultural training provider opened in 1921 and merged with Bridgwater College in 2004. It brought with it campuses in Cannington, Paignton and Yeovil. Students studying animal management at the Paignton campus accessed Paignton Zoo until 2017 when the campus closed.

=== Somerset College of Arts and Technology ===
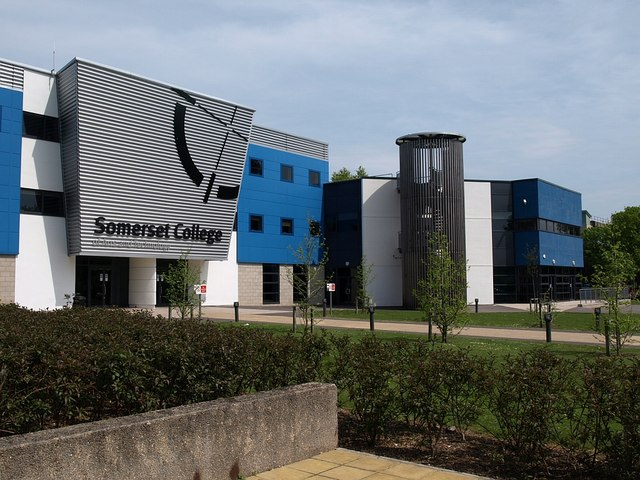
The main façade of the college

The college in Taunton originated as the School of Science and Art and was established in Bath Place in 1856. This followed the Great Exhibition of 1851 which inspired arts education and saw several new art schools open across the country.

In 1898 a foundation stone of the Technical Institute was laid and in February 1900, the Institute was formally opened.

By the 1960s, the College spanned three sites: Corporation Street, the Old Huish Grammar School and the Elms on Wellington Road. All remote sites eventually closed, with the Wellington Road site housing all the provision by the 90s.

In 1956 work began on the present 15-acre (61,000 m^{2}) site at Wellington Road, Taunton and by 1967 all departments were in situ. The College of Art was relocated to an award-winning building, on the campus of the Somerset Technical College in the early 1970s and it became the Somerset College of Arts and Technology in 1974.

In 2001, new £4.2 million technology centre for the college was started.

In 2005 the circular, three story Atrium was opened, the latest phase of a £15 million redevelopment scheme. As well as incorporating a main reception and shopping mall area, information and guidance points, classrooms, and student common rooms, the Atrium houses the majority of the college’s Service Industries division. Other developments have included a conference centre, nursery and a new Health and Social Care centre also completed in 2005.

==== Genesis Project ====
The Genesis Project opened in 2006 and is based at Somerset College. It is a single story centre consisting of several pavilions built from environmentally friendly materials such as straw, timber, earth and clay. The pavilions contain seminar rooms and lecture theatres with exhibition space promoting the very latest in sustainable technology, along with a construction area where visitors can see practical demonstrations of sustainable construction techniques.

=== Bridgwater and Taunton College ===
Bridgwater and Taunton College was formed in 1974 after the merger of Somerset College of Art and Taunton Technical College.

On 1 September 2016, Somerset College of Arts and Technology officially merged with Bridgwater College creating 'Bridgwater and Taunton College'.

In 2017, the college was told by Ofsted to stop referring to itself as outstanding, due to a drop in performance.

In February 2018, the southern hub of the National College for Nuclear was launched at the Bridgwater Campus, funded by the Department for Education (£15 million), the Heart of the South-West local enterprise partnership (£3 million), and Bridgwater and Taunton (£4.5 million). The college is expected to service the building and operation of the Hinkley Point C nuclear power station. The college over 300 students following 30 full-time and apprenticeship courses, and also provides short courses to over 200 adults per year.

== Campuses ==
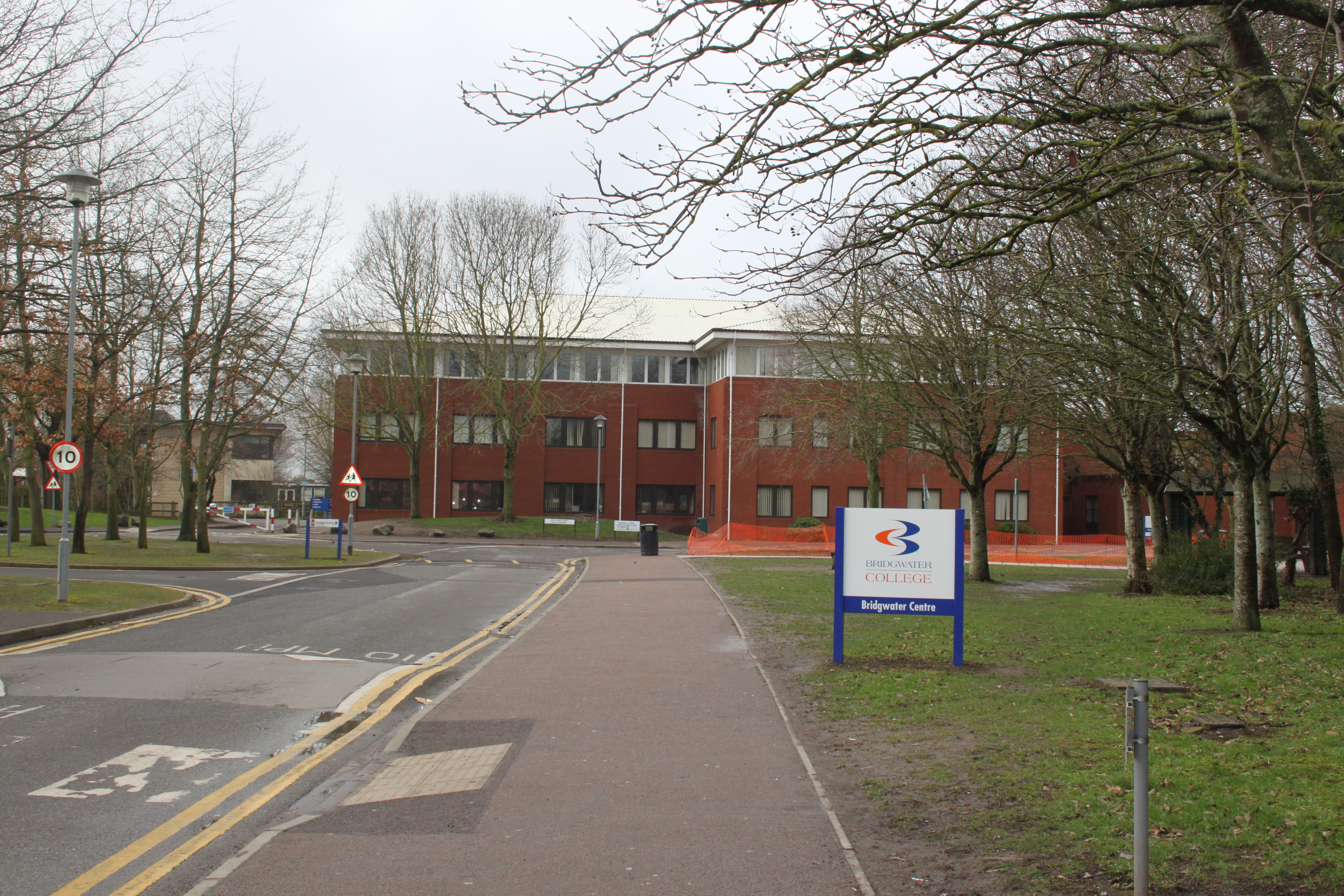
Bridgwater College

The main centre, Bridgwater Campus, houses facilities which include a television studio, forensics laboratory, a motorsport centre and an £8 million building devoted to health & fitness. The centre also houses numerous commercial units such as an early years centre, a beauty salon, a hair salon, a gym, and The McMillan Theatre which opened in 2015. The southern hub of the National College for Nuclear opened in 2018.

The Taunton Campus, on the site of the former Somerset College of Arts and Technology is home to University Centre Somerset as well as a hair and beauty centre, art house and onsite nursery.

The Cannington Campus was established as Cannington College in 1921. Facilities include a new golf course, equestrian centre, commercially run farm, glass houses covering 1,000 m^{2} (11,000 sq ft), wildlife havens, vineyard and the new animal management centre.

The Energy Skills Centre was completed in 2011 to teach nuclear decommissioning for shutting down Hinkley Point B Nuclear Power Station and constructing power plants. Hinkley C. The building also has a windmill and photo-voltaic panels on the roof.

== See also ==
- List of UCAS institutions
- List of universities in the United Kingdom
