= Michael House (geologist) =

British geologist

- Born: Michael Robert House; August 27, 1930; Blandford Forum, England
- Died: August 6, 2002 (aged 71); Weymouth, England
- Education: Downing College, Cambridge
- Awards: Murchison Medal (1991)
- Scientific career
- Fields: Paleontology, geology
- Workplaces: University of Durham; University of Oxford; University of Hull; University of Southampton

Michael Robert House (27 August 1930 – 6 August 2002) was a British geologist, who was best known for his work on ammonites, and the stratigraphy of the Devonian. He was awarded the Murchison Medal of the Geological Society of London in 1991.

== Early life ==
House was born on 27 August 1930 in Blandford Forum, Dorset. His mother was Lilian-May, and his father, Jack, was a plumber who worked in a naval dockyard. House was the middle of three brothers. When House was two, his family moved to Wyke Regis, near Weymouth.

House went to school at Weymouth Grammar School, and it was there that his geography teacher, J Morgan, introduced House to the geology of the region from Weymouth to Lulworth, which was described in a 1947 memoir by Arkell.

== Career ==
From 1949 to 1951, House did his national service in the army, and was stationed near Reading. In October 1951, House went to Downing College, Cambridge to study geology, where he was soon introduced to Arkell, who was then a senior research fellow at Trinity College, Cambridge .

As an undergraduate, his academic potential was clear to Arkell and his head of department,WBR King, and they persuaded Kingsley Dunham at Durham to offer House a lectureship before he had completed his final year examinations. He graduated in 1954. In Durham, House lectured, and began to research the Devonian ammonoids, working towards a PhD. He won a year's fellowship to the US, where he worked on Devonian ammonoid collections.

In 1963, House moved to Oxford to take up a lectureship and fellowship at St Peter's College. In 1967, House was appointed head of geology at the University of Hull. Later he served as dean of science (1976–1978) and pro-vice chancellor (1980–1983). In 1988, the department of geology at Hull was slated to be closed down, following the Oxburgh review of Earth Science departments. House moved to Southampton, before retiring to Weymouth.

== Research ==
House devoted much of his career to the study of ammonoids from the Devonian period, their paleoecology and preservation, and the sediments that they were preserved in. He recognised the value of these fossils for stratigraphy, and realised that they could be used to test ideas about the timing and extent of changes in climate, sea level and environment in the Devonian period.

== Family ==
House was married to Felicity, and they had two children. House died in Weymouth in August 2002, of stomach cancer.

== Professional service ==
House helped to establish the Ussher Society, for the study of the geology of southwest England, in 1962. He was the first editor of the Proceedings of the Ussher Society from 1962 to 1967, and chair (1976, 1977) and vice-chair of the committee (1978, 1979) and a committee member from 1999 - 2002. He was president of the Palaeontological Association and president of the Yorkshire Geological Society from 1972 to 1974; he was also president of section C of the British Association for the Advancement of Science (1977), of the Systematics Society (1978–1981) and president of the Palaeontographical Society from 1989 to 1994.

== Selected works ==
- House, Michael Robert (1958). Geology of the Dorset Coast from Poole to the Chesil Beach. Geologists' Association Field Guide. Vol. 22. pp. 1–21.
- House, M. R. (1979). The origin of major invertebrate groups. Special volumes (Systematics Association). Vol. 12. pp. 1–515. ISBN 0123574501.
- House, M. R.; Gale, A. S. (1995). Orbital forcing timescales and cyclostratigraphy. Geological Society special publication. Vol. 85. pp. 1–210. ISBN 1897799233.
- House, M. R.; Greensmith, J. T. (1993). Geology of the Dorset coast (2nd. ed). Geologists' Association guide. Vol. 22. pp. 1–164. ISBN 0900717580.

== Awards ==
Over the course of his career his work was recognised with a number of awards, including:

- Daniel Pidgeon Fund, GSL, 1957
- SEPM Best Paper award, 1962
- Wollaston Fund, 1964
- William Bolitho Gold Medal, Royal Cornwall Geol Soc
- Neville George Medal, Glasgow Geological Society 1984
- Sorby Medal, Yorkshire Geological Society 1986
- Murchison Medal, 1991
