= Allan Gibb =

Former director of the Small Business Centre, Durham University, Durham (1939–2019)

- Born: 20 November 1939
- Died: 21 December 2019 (aged 80)
- Education: Durham University; Manchester University

Arthur Allan Gibb OBE (20 November 1939 – 21 December 2019) was a British academic. He was the founder and former director of the Small Business Centre at Durham University. Established in 1971 to provide training and education for entrepreneurs, this was the first social enterprise of its kind in Europe.

== Biography ==
Gibb graduated with a degree in Economics from Manchester University in 1961. He spent four years working at the Economist Intelligence Unit before joining Durham University Business School as a Senior Research Assistant, being promoted successively to Research Fellow, Lecturer, and finally Senior Lecturer in 1980. As a staff candidate he earned his Ph.D. from Durham in 1977. He was appointed to the Chair in Small Business Studies in 1983.

Gibb was described in an OECD publication as "the doyen of entrepreneurship and small business development academics". In 2009, Gibb co-authored Leading the Entrepreneurial University, together with G. Haskins, P. Hannon and I. Robertson, published by the National Centre for Entrepreneurship in Education and Said Business School at the University of Oxford. Updated in 2012, the publication served as the principal handbook for the Entrepreneurial University Leaders Programme (EULP), launched at Oxford in 2010.

Gibb died on 21 December 2019, at the age of 80.

== Awards ==
In 2009, he received the Queen's Award for Enterprise Promotion for lifetime achievement. In 2012, Gibb was awarded the first European Entrepreneurship Education Award by the Sten K. Johnson Centre for Entrepreneurship in Sweden.
