= Searles Valentine Wood =

English palaeontologist

Searles Valentine Wood (February 14, 1798 – October 26, 1880) was an English palaeontologist.

== Life ==
Wood went to sea in 1811 as a midshipman in the British East India Company's service, which he left in 1826. He then settled at Hasketon near Woodbridge, Suffolk.

Wood devoted himself to a study of the mollusca of the Newer or Upper Tertiary (now Neogene) of Suffolk and Norfolk, and the Older Tertiary (Eocene) of the Hampshire Basin. His work in East Anglia focussed on the Crag deposits, "crag" being a local term for shelly sand that has been adopted by geologists. Opportunities for fossil-gathering were then plentiful, as these deposits were quarried to be used for fertiliser. These studies led to his chief work, A Monograph of the Crag Mollusca (1848–1856), published by the Palaeontographical Society. He was awarded the Wollaston medal for this work in 1860 by the Geological Society of London. A supplement was issued by him in 1872–1874, a second in 1879, and a third (edited by his son) in 1882.

He worked on the older deposits with his friend Frederick Edwards, Edwards describing the univalves and Wood the bivalves. This resulted in the publication of A Monograph of the Eocene Bivalves of England (1861–1871), also issued by the Palaeontographical Society.

He died at Martlesham, near Woodbridge.

His son, Searles Valentine Wood (1830-1884), was for some years a solicitor at Woodbridge, but gave up the profession and devoted his energies to geology, studying especially the structure of the deposits of the crag and glacial drifts.
