= Caroline Theobald =

Caroline Helen Theobald CBE is the managing director, Bridge Club Ltd., Newcastle upon Tyne. In 2007, she was awarded the Queen's Award for Enterprise Promotion.

She was appointed Commander of the Order of the British Empire (CBE) in the 2016 New Year Honours for services to business and entrepreneurship.
