= Frederick Erasmus Edwards =

British law clerk and amateur geologist

Frederick Erasmus Edwards FGS (1 October 1799 – 15 October 1875) was a British law clerk in the Court of Chancery and an amateur geologist, known for his collection of Eocene Tertiary Mollusca.

F. E. Edwards, with James Scott Bowerbank and five other naturalists, founded the London Clay Club in 1836 and was also a founding member of the Palaeontographical Society in 1847.

For more than forty years he was a law clerk in the Court of Chancery, working as chief clerk for two Masters of the Rolls, Wingfield and Blunt, and two Vice-Chancellors, Sir Richard Torin Kindersley and Sir Richard Malins. Edwards devoted his leisure time to the collection and study of fossil Mollusca.

Originally intended to illustrate the fossils of the London Clay, Mr. Edwards extended his researches over the Eocene strata of Sussex, Hampshire, and the Isle of Wight, where assisted by Mr. Henry Keeping, he made the most complete collection ever attempted by any geologist in a single series of deposits. This Collection was acquired by purchase, for the British Museum, in 1872–73.

He is buried on the western side of Highgate Cemetery.
