= Jason Holt (businessman) =

British business executive (born 1969)

Jason Bruno Acker Holt
- Born: 17 November 1969 (age 56)
- Education: Highgate School

Jason Bruno Acker Holt CBE (born 17 November 1969), is a director of R. Holt & Co, London.

Holt was born into a family of jewellers. His father, R. Holt, had founded R. Holt & Co, a Hatton Garden firm, in 1948.

Holt was educated at Highgate School; he trained as a lawyer and worked for Eversheds. In 1998 he joined R. Holt & Co as a partner.

Around 1999 he founded the not-for-profit Holts Gem and Jewellery School (now Holts Academy of Jewellery).

In 2006, he was awarded the Queen's Award for Enterprise Promotion. He was appointed Commander of the Order of the British Empire (CBE) in the 2015 New Year Honours for services to the jewellery sector and apprenticeships.
