= South Devon College =

Coordinates: 50.415°N 3.588°W

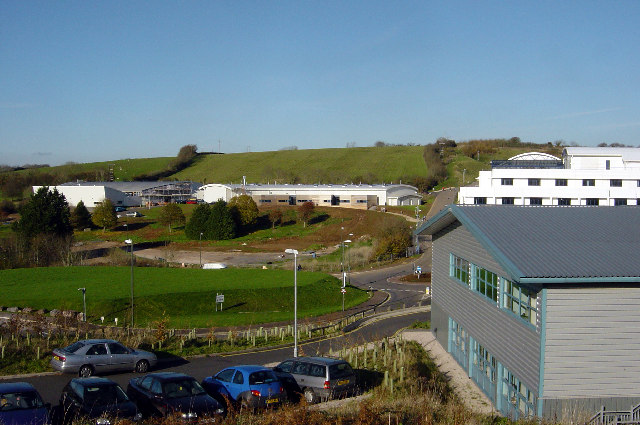
- Part of the College's University Centre in Paignton

Location
- Vantage Point, Long Road; Paignton; United Kingdom

Information
- Type: College of Further Education
- Principal: Laurence Frewin
- Mascot: Paws
- Website: http://www.southdevon.ac.uk

South Devon College is a further education college with 9 different campuses within Torbay and the surrounding area. The college is part of The University of Plymouth Colleges network.

In December 2017, South Devon College achieved an overall grade 2 - 'Good' - in an inspection by Ofsted. South Devon College was also ranked the Number one Further Education and Tertiary College in England in 2014.

== Campuses ==
=== Paignton Campus ===
There are three campuses in Paignton. The Vantage Point Campus is the college's main campus.

- Vantage Point includes a main, three-story building and separate buildings for automotive repair and construction and on site Nursery.
- The University Centre is home to University Centre South Devon which is TEF Gold rated and has lecture and seminar rooms with projection and audio technology. Rooms also have the facility to record lectures. The campus is at Long Road, Paignton, TQ4 7EJ.
- The South West Energy Centre (SWEC) is a solar-powered building for courses in Business, Accounting, Plumbing and Electrical. The campus is at Long Road, Paignton TQ4 7BJ.
- South Devon High School is based at South Devon College, Paignton Campus. Pupils at Key Stage 4 (pupils entering year 10) can choose up to three technical qualifications to study, including Digital Media and Creative Arts, Electronic Principles, Sports Science, Hospitality, Sustainable Construction, Childcare and Development, Health and Social Care. The campus is at Vantage Point, Long Road, Paignton, TQ4 7EJ.

=== Newton Abbot Campus ===
- The Automotive Skills Centre has workshops to deliver Automotive courses from Entry Level to Level 3, as well as apprenticeships. The campus is at Bradley Lane, Newton Abbot, TQ12 1LZ.
- The Brunel Centre is a construction centre. Courses covering the construction trades are run here. The campus is at Brunel Industrial Estate, Collett Way, Newton Abbot TQ12 4PH.

=== Torquay Campus ===
- The Centre for Health and Care Professions. The campus is situated at 187 Newton Road, Torquay, TQ2 7FT.

=== Kingswear Campus ===
Kingswear has one campus on the banks of the River Dart.

- South Devon Marine Academy is a centre for marine training and education. The Academy has 2 38 ft yachts, 5 rigid-hulled inflatable boats (RIBs), two displacement boats, workshops and research and development facilities. The location of this campus is Noss on Dart Marina, Bridge Rd, Kingswear, Dartmouth TQ6 0EA.
