= John Thompson (business academic) =

John Thompson, has been the Roger M Bale Professor of Entrepreneurship at the University of Huddersfield in West Yorkshire, United Kingdom, since 1997. In 2009, he was awarded the Queen's Award for Enterprise Promotion.
