= Sally Arkley =

British businesswoman

Sally Arkley MBE
- Occupation: Businesswoman

Sally Arkley MBE is a British businesswoman. Arkley is the managing director of the Women's Business Development Agency, Coventry, Warwickshire. In 2008, she was awarded the Queen's Award for Enterprise Promotion. In 2010, she received an MBE.
