= Bryan Keating =

British businessman

Bryan Keating CBE
- Education: BSc
- Occupations: Businessman, academic
- Awards: Queen's Award for Enterprise Promotion (2006); OBE (2013); CBE (2019)

Bryan Keating CBE is the managing partner of the CIP partnership, visiting professor at the University of Ulster and chairman of the advisory board of the Northern Ireland Centre for Entrepreneurship in Belfast.

In 2006, he was awarded the Queen's Award for Enterprise Promotion.

Keating was appointed an Officer of the Order of the British Empire (OBE) in the 2013 New Year Honours for services to economic development in Northern Ireland. He was appointed Commander of the same Order (CBE) in the 2019 New Year Honours for services to Economic Development in Northern Ireland.
