= Peter Westgarth =

British businessman

Peter Allen Westgarth CVO was the chief executive, The Duke of Edinburgh's Award (DofE) and former chief executive of Young Enterprise UK, Oxford. In 2006, he was awarded the Queen's Award for Enterprise Promotion.

Westgarth joined The Duke of Edinburgh's Award in 2005 and oversaw a complete rebrand, leaving in 2019. He was appointed Commander of the Royal Victorian Order (CVO) in the 2020 New Year Honours.
