= Zulfiqar Ali (mayor) =

Former mayor of Rochdale (born 1965)

Councillor Zulfiqar Ali

Mayor of Rochdale
- In office 2010–2011
- Preceded by: Keith Swift
- Succeeded by: Alan Godson

Councillor for Rochdale
- Incumbent
- Assumed office 2010

Personal details
- Born: 1965 (age 60–61) Bradford, Yorkshire
- Occupation: Politician

Zulfiqar Ali (born 1965) is former mayor of Rochdale, in the north west of England.

== Early life and career ==
He was born in Bradford. He took office in 2010.

In 2008, he was awarded the Queen's Award for Enterprise Promotion.

Civic offices
Preceded by Keith Swift	Mayor of Rochdale; 2010–2011	Succeeded by Alan Godson
