= Paul Davidson (businessman) =

British businessman

Paul Russell Davidson
- Born: January 1947
- Occupation(s): Chief Executive of Bolton Business Ventures; Managing Director of North Manchester Enterprise Group
- Awards: Queen's Award for Enterprise Promotion (2010)

Paul Russell Davidson (January 1947) is Chief Executive of Bolton Business Ventures, Bolton, Lancashire, where he became director on 28 November 2001. Davidson is also managing director of North Manchester Enterprise Group. Davidson lives in Sale, Cheshire.

In 2007, Davidson's Bolton Business Ventures introduced "pioneering" Halal Grants, working with the Islamic Bank of Britain.

At the award in Bolton and Bury Business Awards, attention was drawn to the millions of pounds investment and the thousands of jobs Davidson had secured for the area.

== Awards and honours ==
Davidson was awarded the Queen's Award for Enterprise Promotion (2010) as Chief Executive of Bolton Business Ventures.

Davidson was also given the Special Achievement award at the fifth the Bolton and Bury Business Awards.
