= Brian Carter =

English footballer (1938–2019)

Personal information
- Full name: Brian Carter
- Date of birth: 17 November 1938
- Place of birth: Dorchester, England
- Date of death: 21 July 2019 (aged 80)
- Height: 5 ft 6 1/2 in (1.69 m)
- Positions: Left half; right half

Senior career*
Years	Team	Apps	(Gls)
1955–1956	Weymouth		
1956–1961	Portsmouth	44	(0)
1961–1962	Bristol Rovers	4	(0)
1962–1967	Bath City	242	(7)
1967–1968	Bridgwater Town		
1969–1970	Welton Rovers (player-manager)		
1970–1971	Bridgwater Town		
1971–1972	Shepton Mallet		
1972–1976	Avon Bradford (player-manager)		
1976–1977	Melksham Town		
1977–?	Clandown		
- * Club domestic league appearances and goals

Brian Carter (17 November 1938–21 July 2019) was an English professional footballer who played as a midfielder in the English Football League for Portsmouth and Bristol Rovers in the 1950s and 1960s.

== Early life ==
Carter was born in Dorset, England, the son of Edward Carter and Eileen Bird. He attended Weymouth Grammar School and began his footballing career with Weymouth as a sixteen-year-old, signing professional terms with them when he turned 17.

== Footballing career ==
In January 1956, two months after his seventeenth birthday, he was signed by Portsmouth for a transfer fee of £2,500. He went on to make 44 league appearances in a five-year spell with the Fratton Park club. He moved to Bristol Rovers in June 1961 for a fee of £1,500 but left after nine months having made just four first team appearances.

From Bristol Rovers he joined Bath City in March 1962, where he appeared in 242 league matches, scoring seven goals. After this he played for a number of non-league clubs around the west of England, mostly in Somerset.
