= David Rowe (executive) =

British businessman

David Rowe is a former director of the University of Warwick Science Park, in the West Midlands of England from 1982–2011. In 2006 he was awarded the Queen's Award for Enterprise Promotion- the only lifetime achievement awardee that year.
