= David Secher =

British businessman

David Secher is a specialist in research commercialisation.

He was awarded the Queen's Award for Enterprise Promotion in 2007 for his work as the co-founder and chairman of Praxis (now Knowledge Exchange UK, of which he is now Patron) and the first chief executive of the N8 Group, a group of universities in the north of England. He is now the Principal of Cambridge Knowledge Transfer (a KT and Interim Management consultancy company); and a Life Fellow of Gonville and Caius College, Cambridge. He is also a Governor of Coventry University and a trustee of United Charities of Cambridge, of The Trinity Challenge, and of The Cambridge Trust. He has served as the Senior and Junior / Domestic Bursar of three Cambridge colleges.
