= Ken Nelson (businessman) =

British businessman (born 1962)

Kenneth John Nelson (born 23 February 1962) is the chief executive of the social enterprise Local Enterprise Development Company Ltd (LEDCOM), Larne, Northern Ireland. He began his career as a textile technologist. In 2010, he was awarded the Queen's Award for Enterprise Promotion. He has served on the board of governors of Ballymena Academy and on the board of governors of the Northern Regional College. On 15 September 2011 he was one of the experts who provided the Committee for Enterprise, Trade and Investment of the Northern Ireland Assembly with oral briefing on Enterprise NI programmes, Local Enterprise Agencies (LEAs) and procurement.

In 2012 Nelson was appointed to a five-year term on the board of Invest Northern Ireland. In 2016 he was appointed as chairman of Intertrade Ireland, a cross-border trade initiative founded as part of the Good Friday Agreement.
