= Angela Wright =

British businessperson

Angela Wright is the former chief executive and founder of Solent Skill Quest Limited, Southampton, Hampshire. She was chair of the National Enterprise Business Partnership (NEBPN), later the Institute for Education Business Excellence (IEBE). In 2009, she was awarded the Queen's Award for Enterprise Promotion.

== Personal life ==
Angela Millington went to Hartford Girls School in Cheshire but left at the age of 15 following her father's death and family relocation to Hampshire. She met Peter Wright in 1970 and they married in October 1971. They have two sons who are both in their 30s and have families of their own.

== Education ==
In 1984, Wright went to work for Don Tremayne, Hampshire Co-ordinator for Industrial Studies. During her time working for him, she completed her Open University Degree, in which she gained First Class Honours, a post-graduate Certificate in Education (Design & Technology), a post-graduate Diploma in Applied Social Science and a post-graduate Certificate in Management Studies.

== Career ==
In 1988–1990, Wright was seconded to UBI Teacher Placement Service where she joined the Communication Team and develop the Award Scheme and Case Study programme.

Wright was the Schools Curriculum Industry Partnership Co-ordinator for Hampshire from 1991 to 1995. In 1995, she was appointed Education Project Manager with Hampshire Training & Enterprise Council. During that time she established three Science and Technology Compacts in Eastleigh, Southampton and Portsmouth. She established a county-wide business mentoring programmes involving over 500 business volunteers support 14- to 16-year-old students falling behind on their studies. She authored work experience guidance for both teachers and employers. During this time, she also completed her teaching practice at Woolston Secondary School in Southampton.

Wright was appointed as CEO of the newly formed Eastleigh EBP in 1997 which then became an independent company with limited guarantee, renamed Solent Skill Quest in 1997. In 2006, she was appointed Chair of the National EBP Network and in 2007, Chair of the National Enterprise Development Group. In 2008, she hosted Peter Jones at the Millbrook Technology Campus during the Most Enterprising Place in Britain competition and won the South East award.

In 2009, she was awarded the Queen's Award for Enterprise Promotion.

In October 2010, Solent Skill Quest became an education charity with Solent EBP its local delivery arm. In 2013, Solent Skill Quest was renamed Skill Quest Trust. Skill Quest Trust acquired First Partnership EBP in March 2013.

Solent EBP awarded "Amazing People" awards from 2009.

Wright worked with national EBP colleagues to relaunch their national network, NEPBN. SHe was chair of the network from 2006 to 2009. She was appointed chair of Governors at Crestwood College for Business and Enterprise, Eastleigh in 2005 and is a governor at Compass School, Southampton – a pupil referral unit.

== Skill Quest Trust Ltd. ==
Skill Quest Trust Ltd. underwent voluntary liquidation in April 2015 in Eastleigh.
