= Walter Herriot =

British businessman

Walter Herriot OBE, was the managing director of St John's Innovation Centre, Cambridge. In 2006, he was awarded the Queen's Award for Enterprise Promotion.
