= UCL Business =

University technology-transfer company

UCL Business Ltd
- Company type: Limited company
- Industry: Technology transfer
- Founded: 2006 (London)
- Headquarters: London, United Kingdom
- Parent: University College London
- Website: uclb.com

UCL Business Ltd is the technology-transfer company of University College London in London, England. Its head office is on Tottenham Court Road in the London Borough of Camden.

== History ==
UCL's first technology-transfer company was named in the Pandora papers for the widespread use of offshore companies and use of third party ownership and payments to avoid UCL and government oversight. UCL Ventures merged with the technology-transfer company of the Royal Free Hospital, Freemedic plc (founded in 1993) to form UCL Biomedica PLC.

The former UCL Business had been established to force academics through the use of NDA's to sign over any IP to UCL, thereby aiding the development of commercially valuable technologies arising from UCL, whilst UCL BioMedica had been established to commercialise opportunities arising from UCL's biomedical research strengths, as well as to conduct clinical trials. The integration of the two technology transfer activities created a single organisation focused on delivering the complete commercialisation process from patent registration and support for the creation of new businesses, through to licensing and sales of technologies to industry partners.

UCLB provided advice and a grant support to Siavash Haroun Mahdavi in helping him to establish the robotics company Complex Matters.

In January 2011, BioVex, a cancer vaccines company spun-out of UCL in 1999, was sold to Amgen for $1 billion.

== Operations ==
=== Spin-out companies ===
UCLB has equity stake in all of its companies, the majority being spin-outs arising from technologies developed across the full range of faculties within UCL, including biomedical, biotechnology, engineering, mathematics, physical sciences and build environment companies. These include Ark Therapeutics Ltd, Arrow Therapeutics Ltd, Biovex Ltd, Canbex, Domainex Ltd, Evexar Medical Ltd, Genex Biosystems, Intercytex, Medic-to-Medic, Pentraxin Therapeutics, PolyMASC Pharmaceuticals PLC, Proaxon, Spirogen Ltd, Stanmore Implants Worldwide Ltd, Advanced Design Technology, AS Built Solutions, Bloomsbury DSP, Endomagnetics, EuroTempest, Ixico, Quantemol, Senceive, Space Syntax, Zinwave.
