= Karen Arnold =

British businessperson

Karen Arnold (born 1964) is a former company director who has been awarded an honorary doctorate from Bournemouth University for her Since 2015, she has worked in military transition, supporting those leaving the military. She was formerly the chief executive of The Enterprise and Skills Company Limited, based in Wimborne Minster, Dorset, which created the Yes Chef Competition on TV.

== Life ==
Arnold grew up in Port Isaac, Cornwall, and studied economics and accountancy. Her Enterprise and Skills Company, founded together with John Knowles, is devoted to promoting entrepreneurship among teenagers. This includes organising competitions in which teenagers briefly set up and run their own businesses.

She has been quoted as saying: "The new buzz word is employability and it is never too soon to encourage students to understand that as well as achieving their academic grades, they need to have a broad portfolio of employability skills which include working together, problem solving and other key skills".

Arnold was Chair of the Dorset Blind Association .

Arnold has been a director of the Dorset Chamber of Commerce and Industry from 17 September 2003 to 14 September 2006, and a governor of Weymouth College and of The Bishop of Winchester Academy.

Arnold is also on the advisory board of the Eden project.

== Awards ==
In 2009, she received the Queen's Award for Enterprise Promotion, and in 2014 she was awarded an honorary doctorate by Bournemouth University for services to education and the charitable sector.
