= Simon Denny (professor) =

British business academic

Simon Denny is a retired professor who was formerly Director of Enterprise, Development and Social Impact at the University of Northampton.

== Career ==
Born and raised in Essex, Denny left school at 17 and joined the British Army, where he rose to the rank of captain. While in the service he studied for a BA at Exeter University.

He was previously the associate dean, Research and Knowledge Transfer, Northampton Business School, University of Northampton, Northamptonshire. His research has included the longevity of social enterprises, demonstrating that they are on average more stable than publicly listed companies.

In 2006 Denny was awarded the university's Court Award for services to enterprise. In 2008 he was elected a Fellow of the Royal Society for the Encouragement of Arts, Manufactures and Commerce.

In 2010, he was awarded the Queen's Award for Enterprise Promotion.

== Works ==
- Social Enterprise: Accountability and Evaluation Around the World Routledge, 2013. With Frederick Seddon. ISBN 978-1136242298
