= Charles Gerard Ford =

British businessman

Charles Gerard Ford, is the director and chief executive of Advantage Northern Ireland Limited, Newtownabbey, Northern Ireland. In 2009, he was awarded the Queen's Award for Enterprise Promotion - the only honorary awardee that year.
