= George Douglas Scott =

British businessman (born 1959)

(George) Douglas Scott (Doug Scott) is Honorary Entrepreneurial Fellow in the Business School of Durham University, and managing director at What You See Is All There Is. He was previously the chief executive officer of Tyneside Economic Development Company (TEDCO Ltd), Jarrow, Tyne and Wear from 1997 to 2013.

== Early life ==
Born in Gateshead, Scott studied economics at the University of Durham where he gained a BA in 1979.

== Career ==
Scott started as a computer programmer, becoming a business librarian and computer scientist in 1981. In 1987 he became the managing editor of Headland Press, moving to TEDCO in 1988 where he rose to chief executive in 1997.

In 2010, he was awarded Queen's Award for Enterprise Promotion - Lifetime Achievement which is only awarded to a maximum of one person each year. His citation read in part "Doug Scott is CEO of a not-for-profit enterprise agency who has made a significant impact on local enterprise development and youth enterprise in the North East for over 20 years in both a paid and a voluntary capacity."

Scott was also chairman of the North East Enterprise Agencies, and vice chairman of the National Federation of Enterprise Agencies.

Scott is on the boards of Customer First UK, United Kingdom Business Incubation, South Tyneside College, Groundwork Trust South Tyneside and Newcastle and Money Answers South Tyneside.

Scott is a director of the Cavendish Consortium and used to be Chairman of the National Enterprise Network.
