= Osman Jessop =

English cricketer

Personal information
- Born: 3 January 1878; Cheltenham, Gloucestershire
- Died: 25 May 1941 (aged 63); Northwood, Middlesex
- Batting: Right-handed

Domestic team information
- Years: Team
- 1901-1911: Gloucestershire
- Source: Cricinfo, 30 March 2014

Osman Jessop (3 January 1878 – 25 May 1941) was an English cricketer. He played for Gloucestershire between 1901 and 1911.
