= Fredericks Foundation =

The Fredericks Foundation is a British microfinance charity that provides financial support and advice for social enterprises and charities.

== Charitable work ==
The Fredericks Foundation was established in 2001 by entrepreneur Paul Barry-Walsh, with the aim of assisting disadvantaged people to become self-employed, start their own business or find paid employment, and helping struggling businesses in difficult economic conditions. Fredericks is a Registered Charity (no 1086562).

The Fredericks Foundation has made over 1900 loans in its first 20 years of operation, with an average of £6,000 per loan. Fredericks has primarily concentrated on start-up microfinance for the financially disadvantaged. Prime Minister David Cameron attended the 10th Anniversary Conference at Blenheim Palace to launch the Fredericks Oxfordshire operation.
