= Douglas Scott (writer) =

Thriller writer (1926–1996)

Douglas Scott (4 December 1926 – 1996) was the pen name of Douglas Smith, a British author of thriller fiction, mostly published during the 1980s. His subject periods run from the theatres of the Second World War to post war Europe. A number of his novels feature seagoing prominently and he sometimes get categorised as an author of naval fiction.

Scott was born in Broughty Ferry, Scotland on 4 December 1926. He died in 1996.

== Bibliography ==
- The Spoils of War – Secker & Warburg, London, 1977 ISBN 0-436-47526-X
- The Gifts of Artemis – Secker & Warburg, London, 1979 ISBN 0-436-44441-0
  - (the above was retitled Operation Artemis, Bobbs-Merrill, Indianapolis, 1979 ISBN 0-672-52610-7 in the USA)
- The Burning of the Ships – Secker & Warburg, London, 1980 ISBN 0-436-44425-9
- Die for the Queen – Secker & Warburg, London, 1981 ISBN 0-436-44426-7
- In the Face of the Enemy – Secker & Warburg, London, 1982 ISBN 0-436-44427-5
- The Hanged Man – Secker & Warburg, London, 1983 ISBN 0-436-44424-0
- Chains – Secker & Warburg, London, 1984 ISBN 0-436-44423-2
- Eagle's Blood – Secker and Warburg, London, 1985 ISBN 0-436-44442-9
- The Albatross Run – Secker & Warburg, London, ISBN 0-436-44443-7
- Shadows – Secker & Warburg, London, 1987 ISBN 0-436-44444-5
- Whirlpool – Century, London, 1988 ISBN 0-7126-2361-2
