= Citrus Saturday =

- Website: www.citrussaturday.org

Citrus Saturday is an international experiential learning programme developed by UCL Advances, the centre for entrepreneurship and business interaction at University College London, aimed at teaching entrepreneurship and enterprise skills to young people around the world by giving them the opportunity to set up a one-day lemonade business and make profit for themselves. The program has developed the Citrus Saturday toolkit, used by groups that work with young people, providing guides, videos and other resources to enable participants to experience business at first-hand.

== History ==
Citrus Saturday was founded by UCL Advances in London in 2011, who sought to create a programme similar to Lemonade Day (in the USA) to promote entrepreneurship in other parts of the world.

Secondary School pupils local to the university in the London Borough of Camden participated in the first Citrus Saturday in July 2011 and by 2012 the program had expanded to Bridgwater, Dublin, Ireland and Edinburgh. In 2013 the program extended to several central locations in London like Covent Garden Market, the South Bank, Euston Station, Paddington Station and Camden Lock Market. and in to new places like Caen, France, Mbabane, Swaziland, and Maputo, Mozambique. Citrus Saturday expanded across Europe in 2014, with events taking place in Spain, Belgium, France, Germany and Greece.

== Awards and recognition ==
As of Winter 2014, 800 young people have sold citrus products across 150 stands with the help of over 400 volunteers in Europe and Africa, resulting in sales of £15,000. Citrus Saturday was awarded the European Institute of Entrepreneurship award for youth interaction. Timothy Barnes won the 2014 Queen's Award for Enterprise Promotion for his achievements in enterprise promotion.
