= Charles Edmund Ford =

Cytogeneticist

Charles Edmund Ford FRS FLS FZS
- Born: 24 October 1912
- Died: 7 January 1999 (aged 86)
- Education: King's College London
- Scientific career
- Fields: Cytogenetics

Charles Edmund Ford FRS FLS FZS (24 October 1912 – 7 January 1999) was a cytogeneticist.

Educated at Slough Grammar School, he graduated in botany from King's College London. He was made a Fellow of the Royal Society in 1965. He was also a Fellow of the Linnean Society of London and the Zoological Society of London
