= Palaeontographical Society =

Charitable organization

The Palaeontographical Society
- Abbreviation: PalSoc
- Formation: 1847
- Legal status: Registered charity
- Purpose: Palaeontology, Science Outreach, Education
- Location(s): UK based (UK and Ireland focus)
- Members: c. 100 members
- President: Dr Yves Candela
- Secretary: Dr Elsa Panciroli
- Website: The Palaeontographical Society

The Palaeontographical Society is a learned society, established in 1847, and is the oldest extant society devoted to the advancement of palaeontological knowledge. The society publishes monographs that further its primary purpose, which is to promote the description and illustration of fossil floras and faunas from Great Britain and Ireland. It also awards medals, prizes, and financial support for research dedicated to the taxonomy and systematic palaeontology of British and Irish fossils. Notable past members of the Society include Gideon Mantell, Roderick Murchison, Reverend Adam Sedgwick, Richard Owen, and Charles Darwin.

== History ==
The precursor of the Paleontographical Society was the London Clay Club, which was founded in 1836 by James Scott Bowerbank and six other naturalists; the club was superseded in 1847 by the Palaeontographical Society. The first council of the Society was presided over by Sir Henry Thomas de la Beche. Initial membership included: Prof. Thomas Bell, Frederick E. Edwards, Sir Philip de Malpas Grey Egerton, Hugh Falconer, William H. Fitton, J.W. Flower, Prof. Edward Forbes, Levett Landon Boscawen Ibbetson, Charles Lyell, John Morris, Prof. John Phillips, Joseph Prestwich, Daniel Sharpe, James Smith, Nathaniel T. Wetherell and Alfred White; the Treasurer was Searles Wood, and Honorary Secretary was J.S. Bowerbank. Thirty-seven local secretaries were also appointed. Notable members of the Society included Robert Heddle, William King, Charles Maclaren, Gideon Mantell, Sir Roderick Murchison and Reverend Adam Sedgwick. The membership totalled almost 600 individuals and institutions. In the following years, eminent scientists such as Richard Owen, Charles Darwin, Robert Chambers and Laurent-Guillaume de Koninck joined the ranks of the Society.

== Logo ==
The Palaeontographical Society's logo features a specimen of Eteoderoceras obesum (Spath, 1925), from the Black Ven Marls, Raricostatum Zone, Densinodulum Subzone, Sinemurian, Lower Jurassic of Stonebarrow, Charmouth, Dorset. The specimen was collected by James Frederick Jackson (1894-1966), of Charmouth – it was featured on Plate 10, fig. 2a of a recent monograph, and is held in Amgueddfa Cymru - National Museum Wales.

== Monographs of the Palaeontographical Society ==
Since starting publishing in March 1848 (Part 1 of Searles Valentine Wood's A Monograph of the Crag Mollusca), the society has published over 600 monographs. Many famous names have published monographs through the Palaeontographical Society. Charles Darwin published his monograph on fossil barnacles, and Richard Owen set out his early descriptions of dinosaurs, as well as his monograph on Mesozoic fossil mammals. Gertrude Lilian Elles and Ethel Mary Reader Wood published a key monograph on British graptolites. The monographs frequently feature highly detailed illustrations including some by Mary Buckland. Historically, the Palaeontographical Society published and distributed these monographs on its own. However, the society has recently established a partnership with Taylor & Francis who now take care of their publication, distribution, and online hosting. Taylor & Francis are also working to digitise all back issues of the series so that they are available to active members.

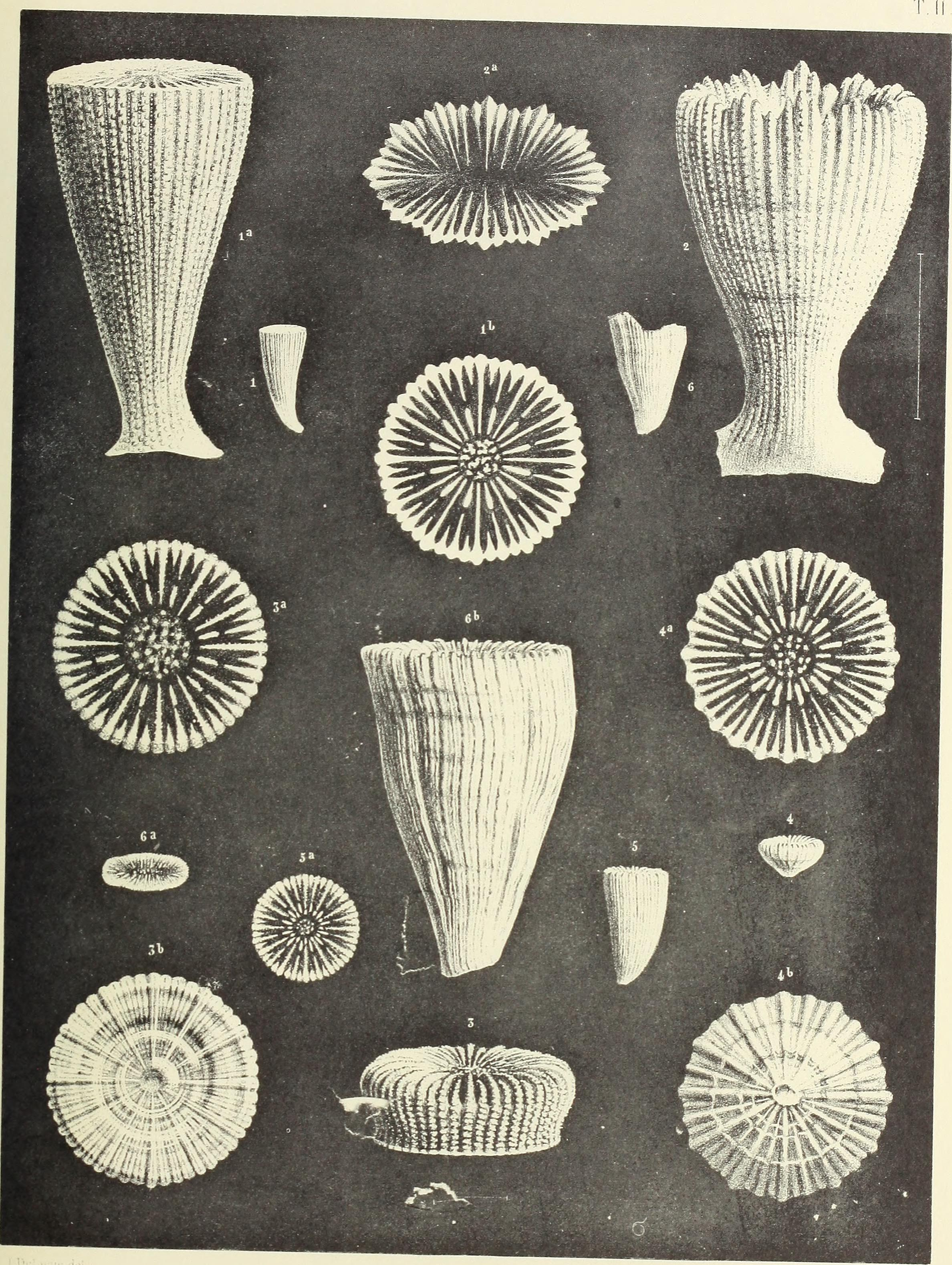
An example plate from Monographs of the Palaeontographical Society

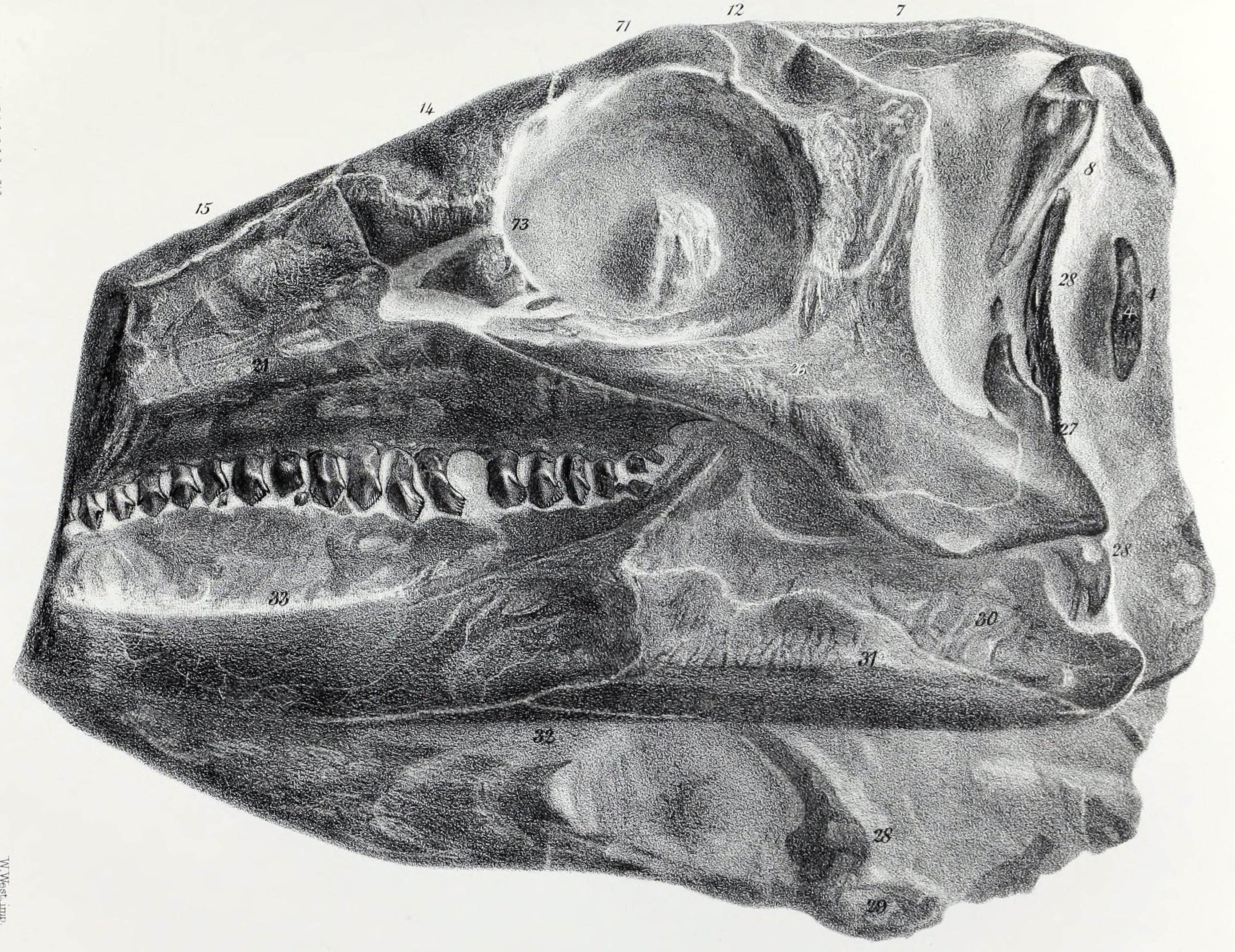
The skull of Scelidosaurus described by Owen in 1861

=== Examples ===
- 2025, Gale, A.S. British Fossil Cirripedia. Part 2, Calanticomorpha, Scalpellomorpha. Monographs of the Palaeontographical Society, 105–193 (Publ 671, part of Volume 179).
- 2023, Bonsor, J.A., Lockwood J.A.F., Leite, J.V., Scott-Murray, A, & Maidment, S.A. The osteology of the holotype of the british iguanodontian dinosaur Mantellisaurus atherfieldensis. Monographs of the Palaeontographical Society, 1–63 (Publ 665, part of Volume 177).
- 2015, Wright, C.W. & Kennedy, W.J. The Ammonoidea of the Lower Chalk. Part 6. Monograph of the Palaeontographical Society London: pp. 404–459, pls 125–145 (Publ 645, part of Volume 169).
- 2015, Smith, A.B. British Jurassic regular echinoids. Part 1 (Introduction, Cidaroida, Echinothurioida, Aspidodiadematoida and Pedinoida). Monograph of the Palaeontographical Society London: pp. 1–67, pls 1–41 (Publ 644, part of Volume 169).
- 2014, Donovan, S.K. & Fearnhead, F.E. The British Devonian Crinoidea. Part 1 – Introduction and Camerata. Monograph of the Palaeontographical Society London: pp. 1–55, pls 1–15 (Publ 643, part of Volume 168).
- 2014, Smith, A.S. & Benson, R.B.J. Osteology of Rhomaleosaurus thorntoni (Sauropterygia: Rhomaleosauridae) from the Lower Jurassic (Toarcian) of Northamptonshire, England. Monograph of the Palaeontographical Society London: pp. 1–40, pls 1–35 (Publ 642, part of Volume 168).
- 2013, Copestake, P. & Johnson, B. Lower Jurassic foraminifera from the Llanbedr (Mochras Farm) borehole, north Wales, UK. Monograph of the Palaeontographical Society London: pp. 1–403, pls 1–21 (Publ 641, part of Volume 167).
- 2013, Mohibullah, M., Williams, M. & Zalasiewicz, J.A. Late Ordovician ostracods of the Girvan District, south-west Scotland. Monograph of the Palaeontographical Society London: pp. 1–40, pls 1–6 (Publ 640, part of Volume 167).
- 2010, Hooker, J.J., The mammal fauna of the early Eocene Blackheath formation of Abbey Wood, London. Monographs of the Palaeontographical Society, 1–153 (Publ 671 part of Volume 164).
- 1901–1918, Elles & Wood's British Graptolites
- 1871, Owen's Fossil Mammals of the Liassic Formations
- 1861–1881, Owen's Fossil Reptilia of the Liassic
- 1855, Darwin's Fossil Balanidae and Verrucidae
- 1851, Darwin's Fossil Lepadidae

== Financial support, grants and awards ==
The Palaeontographical Society provides support for events and initiatives which meet its purpose to advance palaeontological knowledge with particular emphasis on British and Irish fossils. The Society also has five grants and awards to celebrate and provide support for research dedicated to the taxonomy and systematic palaeontology of British and Irish fossils.

=== The Edward Forbes Prize ===
The Edward Forbes Prize is awarded for publication excellence by early career researchers in the field of taxonomic and systematic palaeontology.

=== The Richard Owen Research Fund ===
The Richard Owen Research Fund serves to support palaeontological research (travel and accommodation for collections visits and/or fieldwork, analytical work, etc.) for describing the fossil fauna and flora of the UK and Ireland.

=== The Marsh Palaeoart Award ===
This award recognises talent in the depiction of fossil fauna and flora of the UK and Ireland.

=== The Bulman Fund ===
The Bulman Fund exists to help in the preparation of illustrations for monographs of the Society that have been accepted, and especially those that are in an advanced stage of preparation.

=== Palaeontographical Society Medal ===
The Palaeontographical Society Medal is awarded biennially in recognition of a sustained and important series of contributions to the taxonomic and systematic palaeontology of Great Britain and Ireland, especially those which address problems of palaeogeography, palaeoecology and phylogeny. Recipients are not limited to palaeontologists based in the UK and Ireland.

Past recipients:

- 2026: Dr Jerry J. Hooker
- 2024: Dr Paul Taylor
- 2022: Professor Susan E Evans
- 2020: Professor Jenny Clack
- 2018: Dr Robert Owens
- 2016: Dr Adrian W.A. Rushton
- 2014: Professor William James Kennedy (first recipient)

== Presidents of the society ==
Past presidents have included several Fellows of the Royal Society such as Sir Richard Owen, Thomas Henry Huxley, Willian John Hamilton, and Richard Fortey.

- 2026-present: Yves Candela
- 2021–2026: Caroline Buttler
- 2019–2021: Stephen K. Donovan
- 2013–2018: Paul M. Barrett
- 2009– 2012: Andrew B Smith
- 2007–2009: Richard Fortey
- 1998–: Chris Paul
- 1994–1998: Robin Cocks
- 1989–1994: Michael Robert House
- 1979–1984: Desmond T. Donovan
- 1974–1979: Richard Valentine Melville
- 1971–1974: Oliver Meredith Boone Bulman
- 1966-1971: Sir Cyril James Stubblefield
- 1942–1966: Herbert Leader Hawkins
- 1934–1942: Sir Arthur Smith Woodward
- 1928–1934: Francis Arthur Bather
- 1921–1928: Edwin Tulley Newton
- 1895–1921: Henry Woodward
- 1892–1895: Thomas Henry Huxley
- 1876–1892: Sir Richard Owen
- 1867-1876: James Scott Bowerbank
- 1855–1867: Willian John Hamilton
- 1847–1855: Sir Henry de la Beche

== See also ==
- James Scott Bowerbank
- Ray Society
