= Chwarae Teg =

Welsh charity for gender equality

- Founded: 1992
- Type: Charitable organisation
- Location: Cardiff
- Region served: Wales
- Key people: Lucy Reynolds Chief Exec
- Employees: 80
- Website: chwaraeteg.com//

Chwarae Teg (Welsh for 'Fair Play') was a charity in Wales supporting the economic development of women, as well as working with businesses and organisations to develop and improve working practices. It ceased operation in 2023.

== History ==
Chwarae Teg was launched by a consortium in 1992 in South Wales, and Jane Hutt, now a minister in the Welsh Government, was appointed its first director.

In 2009 Chwarae Teg launched their European Social Fund and Welsh Government sponsored project, Agile Nation (more details below). Referred to as "Chwarae Teg Agile Nation project #1", the project was completed in March 2015.

On 22 July 2015 Chwarae Teg launched another European Social Fund and Welsh Government sponsored project, "Agile Nation #2".

== Activities ==
=== Agile Nation ===
Launched in 2009 and completed in March 2015, the Chwarae Teg Agile Nation project aimed to promote gender equality, support the career advancement of women and contribute to a reduction in the gender pay gap. Agile Nation was a £12.5 million project funded by the European Social Fund and the Welsh Government.

The project had two training programs: Ascent (targeted at individual women) and Evolve (targeted at employers). These helped over 2,921 individual women and 504 businesses as of March 2015.

=== Policy ===
Chwarae Teg's policy function monitors economic and workforce developments that impact on women and business across Wales and provides advice to academia, government and industry. This knowledge is used to identify areas where new targeted projects can be developed to address areas of under-representation of women in the workplace.

=== Membership ===
Chwarae Teg is a registered charity which offers membership to individuals, businesses, organisations and institutions.

== Trustees ==
The trustees of Chwarae Teg are:

- Sandra Busby - Chair
- Jeffrey Andrews
- Carol Bogue-Lloyd
- Rachel Cunningham
- David Pritchard
- Susan Lane
- Dr Anita Shaw
- Catherine Thomas
- Alison Thorne
- Christopher Warner
- Sian Wiblin

== Past chief executives ==
- Jane Hutt (1992–1999)
- Ruth Marks (1999–2005)
- Marcella Maxwell (2006–2008)
- Katy Chamberlain (2008–2012)
- Joy Kent (2013-2016)
- Cerys Furlong (2016 - 2022)

== Past chairs ==
- Jane Jones
- Elan Closs Stephens CBE
- Gwenda Williams
- Jacky Tongue
- Debbie Green
