= List of presidents of the Geologists' Association =

This is a list of presidents of the Geologists' Association.

- 1858–59 Smith, Toulmin
- 1859–62 WILTSHIRE, The Revd. Thomas DSc FLS FGS
- 1862–64 Tennant, Professor James FGS FRGS
- 1864–66 CRESY, Edward
- 1866–68 RICHARDSON, Christopher Thomas MD
- 1868–71 Morris, Professor John MA FGS
- 1871–73 WILTSHIRE, The Revd. Thomas DSc FLS FGS
- 1873–75 Woodward, Henry LLD FRS FGS FZS
- 1875–77 Carruthers, William FRS FLS FGS
- 1877–79 Morris, Professor John MA FGS
- 1879–81 Jones, Professor T. Rupert FRS FGS
- 1881–83 Hudleston, W. H. MA FRS FGS FCS
- 1883–85 Hicks, Henry MD FRS FGS
- 1885–87 Topley, W. FRS FGS AssocInstCE
- 1887–89 Rudler, F. W. ISO FGS
- 1889–91 HOLMES, Thomas Vincent FGS
- 1891–93 Blake, The Revd. Professor J. F. MA FGS
- 1893–94 Woodward, Horace B. FRS FGS
- 1894–96 McMahon, Lt-General C. A. FRS FGS
- 1896–98 Newton, E. T. FRS FGS FZS
- 1898–00 Teall, Sir J. J. H. MA FRS FGS
- 1900–02 Whitaker, W. BA FRS FGS
- 1902–04 MONCKTON, Horace Woollaston FLS FGS
- 1904–06 Smith Woodward, Sir Arthur. LLD FRS FLS FGS
- 1906–08 HERRIES, Robert Stanfield MA FGS
- 1908–10 Watts, Professor W. W. LLD DSc MSc FRS FGS
- 1910–12 HILL, William FGS
- 1912–14 Evans, John W. CBE LLB DSc FRS FGS
- 1914–16 YOUNG, George W. FGS FZS
- 1916–18 Barrow, George FGS
- 1918–20 Green, J. F. N. BA FGS
- 1920–1-22 Whitaker, W. BA FRS FGS
- 1922–24 HAZZLEDINE WARREN, Samuel FGS
- 1924–26 DEWEY, Henry FGS
- 1926–28 BULL, Alfred Joseph MSc FGS
- 1928–30 Morley Davies, Arthur DSc ARCS FGS
- 1930–32 Watts, Professor W. W. LLD DSc MSc FRS FGS
- 1932–34 LEACH, Arthur Leonard FGS
- 1934–36 Kitson, Sir Albert E. CMG CBE FGS
- 1936–38 McINTYRE, Peter FGS
- 1938–40 Hawkins, Professor H. L. DSc FRS FGS
- 1940–42 STEBBING, William Pinkard D. FSA FGS LRIBA
- 1942–44 Read, Professor H. H. DSc ARCS FRS FGS
- 1944–46 KENNARD, Alfred Santer ALS FGS
- 1946–48 BROMEHEAD, Cyril Edward Nowill BA FGS
- 1948–50 BROWN, Edmund Ernest Stockwell MBE FGS
- 1950–52 Eastwood, Tom ARCS MIMM FGS
- 1952–54 HIMUS, Godfrey Wilfred PhD FGS
- 1954–56 Cox, L. R. OBE MA DSc RS FGS
- 1956–58 WRIGHT, Claud William MA FilDr CB FGS
- 1958–60 WILLIAMS, Professor David DSc PhD MIMM FGS
- 1960–62 PITT, Leslie John FGS
- 1962–64 KIRKALDY, Professor John Francis DSc FGS
- 1964–66 Curry, Dennis MA FGS
- 1966–68 Sutton, Professor J. DSc FRS FGS
- 1968–70 MONTFORD, Horace Moutrie OBE BSc FGS
- 1970–72 HOLMES, Stanley Charles Arthur MA FGS
- 1972–74 ARBER, Muriel Agnes MA FGS FRGS
- 1974–76 AGER, Professor Derek Victor DSc PhD DIC FGS
- 1976–78 MOORE, Francis Harry BSc PhD FGS
- 1978–80 BISHOP, Arthur Clive BSc PhD FGS
- 1980–82 SMITH, Alec James BSc PhD FGS
- 1982–84 KNILL, Professor John Lawrence DSc FICE FIGeol FGS
- 1984–86 KING, Anthony John Paynter FCII FGS
- 1986–88 HANCOCK, Professor John Michael MA PhD FGS
- 1988–90 EVANS, John Michael BA
- 1990–91 Halstead, Lambert Beverly PhD DSc FGS
- 1991–94 ROBINSON, John Eric BSc PhD
- 1994–96 GREEN, Christopher Paul BA DPhil FGS
- 1996–98 SYMES, Robert Frederick OBE BSc PhD
- 1998–2000 MOODY, Professor Richard Thomas Jones PhD FGS
- 2000–02 BROWN, Susan BSc MSc DIC FGS M.Inst.Env.Sc
- 2002–04 FRENCH, William John BSc PhD FGS
- 2004–06 COCKS, Professor, Leonard Robert Morrison OBE TD MA D.Phil. DSc CGeol FGS
- 2006–08 Benton, Michael James BSc PhD. FGS
- 2008–10 SCHREVE, Danielle C. BSc, PhD
- 2010–12 BRIDGLAND, D.R. BSc, PhD
- 2012–14 MORTIMORE, R.N. Professor BSc.PhD.MIGeol, C.Eng.C.Geol. FGS
- 2014–16 BAILEY, H.W., BSc. PhD. C.Geol. FGS
- 2016–18 PROSSER, Colin D. BSc. PhD. FGS
- 2018–20 PIERPOINT, Nicholas BSC FGS
- 2020-22 BANKS, Vanessa BSc. PhD.
- 2022- Hickman, Graham P. BSC. FGS

== See also ==
- List of geologists
