= Lyell Medal =

British geological award

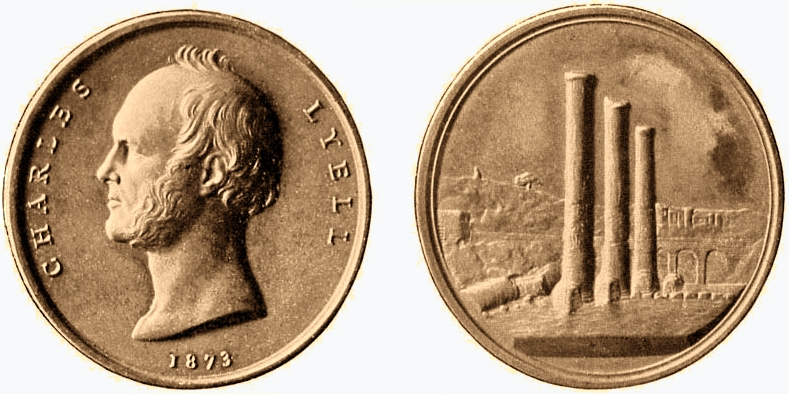
Lyell Medal

The Lyell Medal is an annual scientific medal given by the Geological Society of London, equal in status to the Murchison Medal. This medal is awarded based on one Earth Scientist's exceptional contribution of research to the scientific community. It is named after Charles Lyell.

== Lyell Medalists ==
Source: Geological Society

=== 19th century ===
- 1876 John Morris
- 1877 James Hector
- 1878 George Busk
- 1879 Edmond Hebert
- 1880 John Evans
- 1881 John William Dawson
- 1882 John Lycett
- 1883 William Benjamin Carpenter
- 1884 Joseph Leidy
- 1885 Harry Govier Seeley
- 1886 William Pengelly
- 1887 Samuel Allport
- 1888 Henry Alleyne Nicholson
- 1889 William Boyd Dawkins
- 1890 Thomas Rupert Jones
- 1891 Thomas McKenny Hughes
- 1892 George Highfield Morton
- 1893 Edwin Tulley Newton
- 1894 John Milne
- 1895 John Frederick Blake
- 1896 Arthur Smith Woodward
- 1897 George Jennings Hinde
- 1898 Wilhelm Waagen
- 1899 Charles Alexander McMahon
- 1900 John Edward Marr

=== 20th century ===
- 1901 Ramsay Heatley Traquair
- 1902 Antonin Fritsch
- 1902 Richard Lydekker
- 1903 Frederick William Rudler
- 1904 Alfred Gabriel Nathorst
- 1905 Hans Reusch
- 1906 Frank Dawson Adams
- 1907 (John) Joseph Frederick Whiteaves
- 1908 Richard Dixon Oldham
- 1909 Percy Fry Kendall
- 1910 Arthur Vaughan
- 1911 Francis Arthur Bather
- 1911 Arthur Walton Rowe
- 1912 Philip Lake
- 1913 Sydney Savory Buckman
- 1914 Charles Stewart Middlemiss
- 1915 Edmund Johnston Garwood
- 1916 Charles William Andrews
- 1917 Wheelton Hind
- 1918 Henry Woods
- 1919 William Fraser Hume
- 1920 Edward Greenly
- 1921 Emmanuel de Margerie
- 1922 Charles Davison
- 1923 Gustave Frédéric Dollfus
- 1924 William Wickham King
- 1925 John Frederick Norman Green
- 1926 Owen Thomas Jones
- 1927 Albert Ernest Kitson
- 1928 Sidney Hugh Reynolds
- 1928 William Dickson Lang
- 1929 Arthur Morley Davies
- 1930 Frederick Chapman
- 1930 Herbert Maufe
- 1931 Ernest Clayton Andrews
- 1932 Henry Dewey
- 1932 Maria Matilda Ogilvie Gordon
- 1933 James Ernest Richey
- 1934 Walter Howchin
- 1934 Finlay Lorimer Kitchin
- 1935 D. M. S. Watson
- 1936 Eleanor Mary Reid
- 1936 Leonard Johnston Wills
- 1937 Linsdall Richardson
- 1938 John Pringle
- 1939 Noel Benson
- 1940 Herbert Leader Hawkins
- 1941 Ernest Sheppard Pinfold
- 1942 William Sawney Bisat
- 1943 Darashaw Nosherwan Wadia
- 1944 Norman Ross Junner
- 1945 Leonard Frank Spath
- 1946 Robert Heron Rastall
- 1947 Stanley Smith
- 1948 Arthur Hubert Cox
- 1949 William Joscelyn Arkell
- 1950 Samuel James Shand
- 1951 William Dixon West
- 1952 Alfred Kingsley Wells
- 1953 Oliver Meredith Boone Bulman
- 1954 John Baird Simpson
- 1955 Wilfred Norman Edwards
- 1956 Leslie Reginald Cox
- 1957 Stephen Henry Straw
- 1958 Helen Marguerite Muir-Wood
- 1959 David Williams
- 1960 Doris Reynolds
- 1961 John Vernon Harrison
- 1962 Lawrence Wager
- 1963 Neville George
- 1964 Dorothy Hill
- 1965 Charles Findlay Davidson
- 1966 Sergei Ivanovich Tomkeieff
- 1967 William Quarrier Kennedy
- 1968 Maurice Black
- 1969 Francis John Turner
- 1970 Frederick Henry Stewart
- 1971 Percival Allen
- 1972 Alec Westley Skempton
- 1973 Janet Vida Watson
- 1974 Martin Fritz Glaessner
- 1975 Dorothy Helen Rayner
- 1976 Walter Brian Harland
- 1977 Bernard Elgey Leake
- 1978 Robin Gilbert Charles Bathurst
- 1979 Derek Ager
- 1980 John Robert Lawrence Allen
- 1981 William Stuart McKerrow
- 1982 George P. L. Walker
- 1983 John Frederick Dewey
- 1984 Douglas James Shearman
- 1985 John Douglas Hudson
- 1986 Harry Blackmore Whittington
- 1987 Nicholas John Shackleton
- 1988 Richard Gilbert West
- 1989 John Michael "Jake" Hancock
- 1990 Anthony Hallam
- 1991 John Imbrie
- 1992 Alfred G. Fischer
- 1993 Michael Robert Leeder
- 1994 William Gilbert Chaloner
- 1995 Robert Keith O'Nions
- 1996 Richard Allen Fortey
- 1997 Richard Barrie Rickards
- 1998 Simon Conway Morris
- 1999 Ernest Henry Rutter
- 2000 Derek Ernest Gilmor Briggs

=== 21st century ===
- 2001 Paul Tapponnier
- 2002 Andrew Smith
- 2003 Harry Elderfield
- 2004 Dianne Edwards
- 2005 Michael James Benton
- 2006 Geoffrey Boulton
- 2007 Philip Allen
- 2008 Alan Gilbert Smith
- 2009 Nick McCave
- 2010 William Ruddiman
- 2011 Christopher Paola
- 2012 Eric Wolff
- 2013 Paula Reimer
- 2014 Martin Brasier
- 2015 Colin Ballantyne
- 2016 John R. Underhill
- 2017 Rosalind Rickaby
- 2018 Julian A. Dowdeswell
- 2019 Nicholas Kusznir
- 2020 Rachel Wood
- 2021 Nicholas White
- 2022 William B. F. Ryan
- 2023 Peter Clift
- 2024 Lynne Frostick
- 2025 Hugh Jenkyns
- 2026 Margaret Collinson

== See also ==
- List of geology awards
- Prizes named after people
