= Dennis Curry =

Dennis Curry

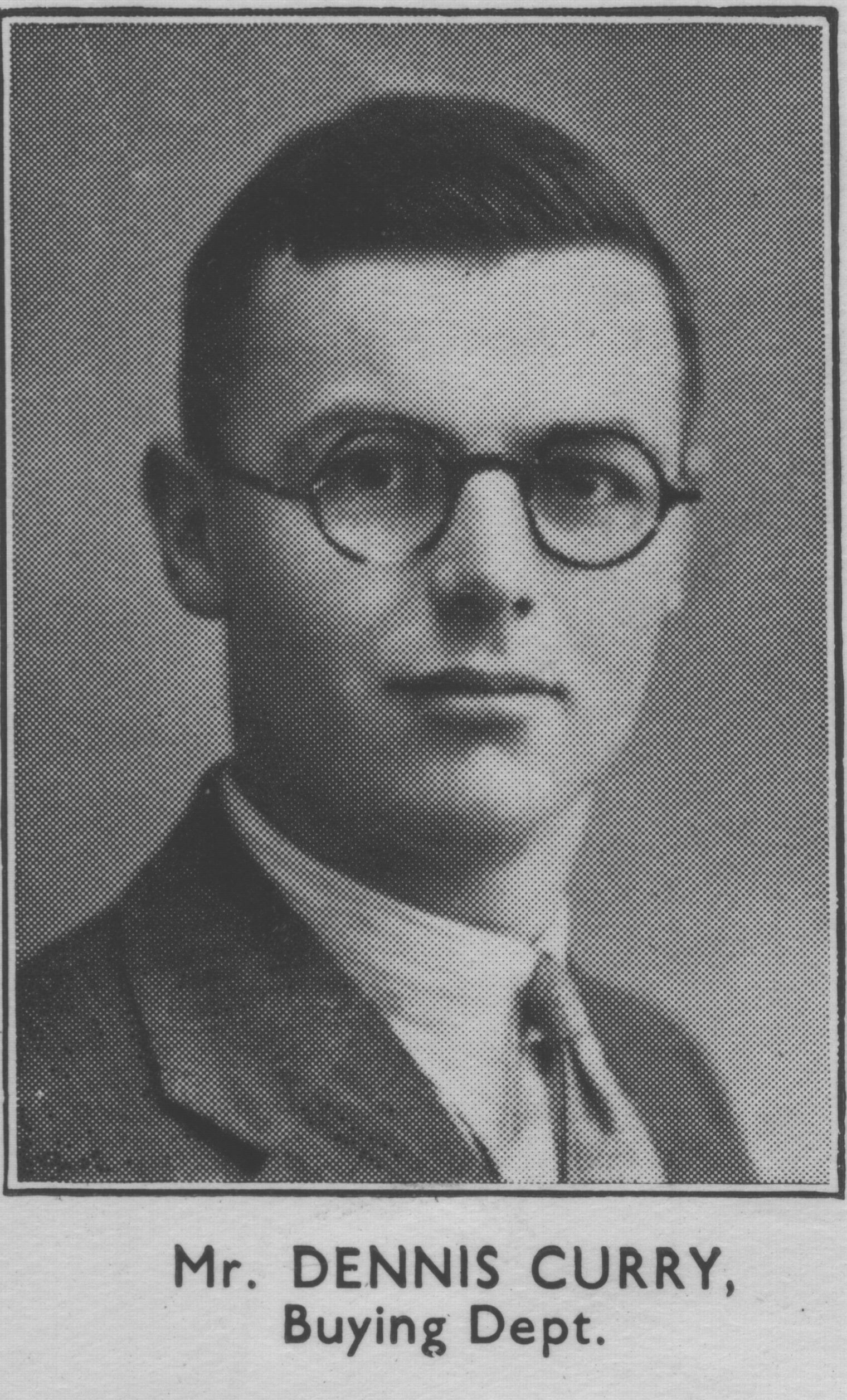
Dennis Curry in 1935

Dennis Curry (18 May 1912 – 3 March 2001) was a British businessman, geologist and philanthropist. He was born into the family that owned and ran the Currys electrical goods retail chain, and took his place in the family business, rising to become its chairman.

While at school he developed a passion for geology and studied this subject, initially at Jesus College, Cambridge, and subsequently as a hobby for the rest of his life. His scientific contributions earned the recognition of professional colleagues – most notably in the award of the Prestwich Medal of the Geologists' Association in 1966 – as well as a visiting professorship and part-time teaching position at University College London. He collected many thousands of specimens and published over 120 scientific papers, endowed a number of societies and institutions with funds and gifts of Currys' shares, and shortly before his death, passed his scientific collections of specimens and books to London's Natural History Museum, where they remain accessible as the "Dennis Curry Collection".

== Early life and education ==
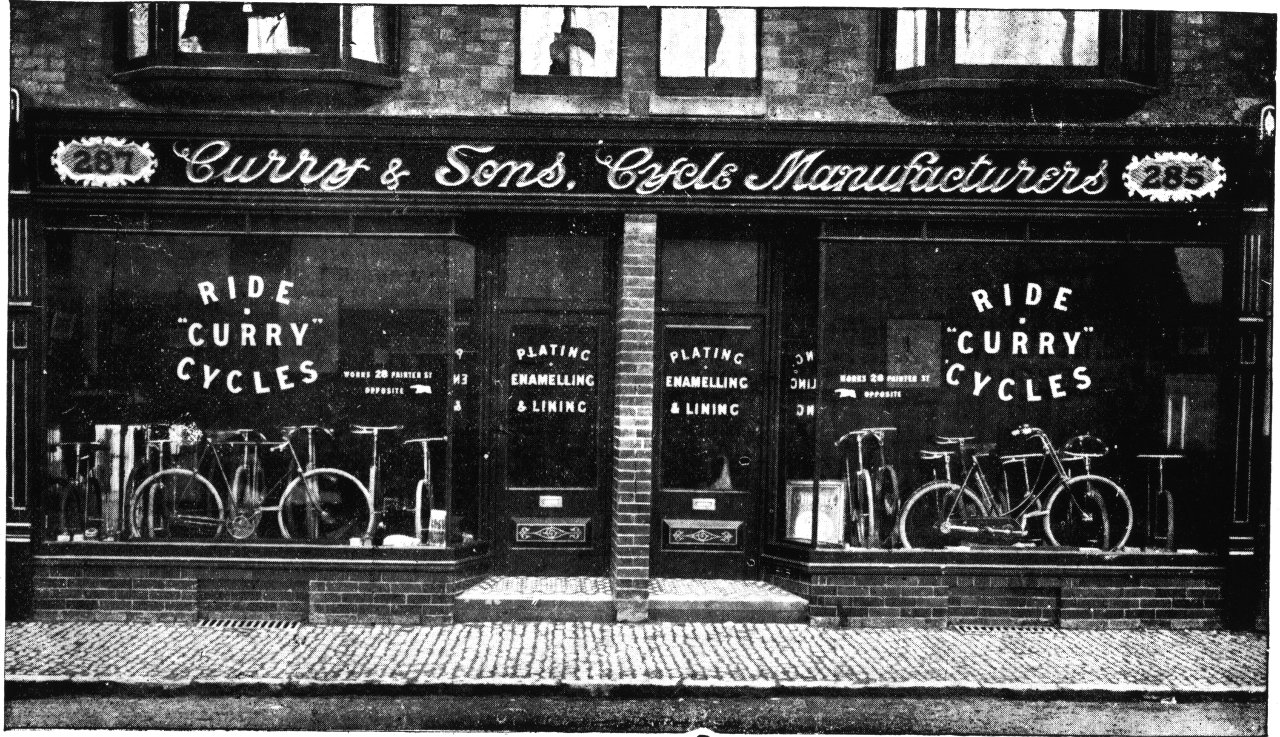
Currys' bicycle shop at 285-287 Belgrave Gate, Leicester, in 1903

Curry's grandfather had founded Currys as a small bicycle-manufacturing and retail company. Curry's father took over and began to build up the company and expand its offerings, and by 1927 had 180 stores and had taken the company public.

Born in Leicester, England, and moving with his family to Brighton as a child, Curry became interested in geology while on fishing trips with his father to Newhaven, East Sussex; he would grow bored and explore the nearby cliffs, looking for fossils. When the family moved to Bournemouth, he continued studying the geology of the coast there. He passed his higher school certificate at Bournemouth School a year early and spent his last year studying geology. He was the oldest son, and his family wanted him to enter the business, but he had won a scholarship to Jesus College, Cambridge, where he graduated with a double first in 1933, and then was able to study a year further under a Harkness Fellowship. He wanted to go on studying geology but his family pressed him to join the business; after what his Guardian obituary described as a "huge row" he did so, at the age of 21.

== Commercial career and geological interests ==
At Currys, he initially concentrated on the radios section of the buying department, and was made a director in 1938. Between 1942 and 1945 he joined the RAF where he trained recruits in the use of radio and radar equipment; after the war, he returned to the family business where he initially became a joint managing director, then chairman of the company from 1967 until his retirement in 1984. During this time the company underwent considerable expansion becoming a major consumer supplier of televisions and white goods, in addition to the bicycles with which the firm had originally started.

In parallel with his commercial career, he continued his geological studies with a passion; in its tribute volume to him published in 2010, the U.K. Micropalaeontological Society described him as "a remarkable polymath and philanthropist, leading a double-life as one of the UK's most gifted amateur geologists, whilst at the same time being an extremely successful businessman (as Managing Director of Currys Ltd)", as well as "the professional amateur". He was president of the Geologists' Association (1963–65), and was awarded its prestigious Prestwich Medal in 1966. For many years he was a prominent member of the International Sub-Commission on Palaeogene Stratigraphy; his particular interests included the chalk and overlying Tertiary rocks of Britain, France and Belgium, together with important work establishing the geology underlying the English Channel, which he studied (along with co-workers) using sediment cores collected from research vessels, as well as via seismic and other methods (key papers published from 1962 onwards).

As index species for correlating and establishing the ages of rocks he employed the study of microscopic fossils such as foraminifera and calcareous nannofossils (coccoliths), which he would frequently prepare by concentrating them from their clay residues by washing the samples through cloths in his hotel bedrooms while away on field trips, to the amusement of his more "professional" colleagues, before inspecting them with his hand lens; on several occasions this enabled him to comment on the material just collected in almost "real time" before any of his colleagues had studied them back in their laboratories, as well as greatly reducing the bulk of material to be carried home. Despite his use of "amateur methods" in some respects, his contributions to the fields of geology and micropaleontology were accepted by the most respected journals in the relevant areas and he published more than 120 scientific papers over a 62-year period, a remarkable achievement for one whose main professional activities lay elsewhere.

== Recognition and legacy ==
In 1971, Curry was awarded an academic position as a visiting professor at University College London where he continued his scientific work, together with some teaching at M.Sc. level, well into his retirement. In 1998 he donated his considerable fossil collection comprising in excess of 90,000 specimens, together with his research library, to the Natural History Museum in London, as well as setting up a number of charitable trusts through and after his lifetime in the areas of geological science and maritime activities.

Jake Hancock wrote in 1989:

Dennis Curry's work is marked by its extraordinary breadth. During a period of time in which specialisation in science has become the norm, he has retained a general approach and yet coped with fields ranging from sampling on a micro-scale to coring at sea, from the taxonomy and stratigraphy of micro-fossils to the complexities of the interpretation of radiometric dates. This broad competence has made him one of the most widely respected stratigraphers on the Cenozoic in our time. One cannot help wondering if he would have been able to avoid working on a narrower field if he had been forced to compete as a professional.

Regarding Curry's philanthropy, Nina Morgan wrote in 2009:

His gift of Curry's shares form the basis of the GA's [Geologists' Association] Curry Fund, which provides grants to promote a wider public understanding of geology. The results of his share donations to GSL [Geological Society of London] were even more staggering. Dividends from the shares ensured the future of the Library. And proceeds from their eventual sale allowed GSL to set up its publishing house in 1987. As if this were not enough, Curry went on to assign his share of a family trust fund – amounting to nearly £400,000 – to the Geol. Soc."

These funds have also allowed the Geologists' Association to award an annual Curry Prize of £1,000 utilising funds gifted by Dennis Curry in 1986 to encourage student excellence at M.Sc. level on a geology-related topic.
