= Helen Marguerite Muir-Wood =

British paleontologist

Helen Marguerite Muir-Wood MBE (February 1895 or 1896 – 16 January 1968) was a British paleontologist and historian of paleontology who spent her career at London's Natural History Museum. She is a recipient of the Lyell Medal for her contributions to the field.

== Early life and education ==
Born in Hampstead, England, in 1895 or 1896, Helen Marguerite Muir-Wood studied geology at the University of London's Bedford College under Catherine Raisin. She earned a Bachelor of Science in 1918, and then later gained a D.Sc at University College London, in 1934, under Professor E. J. Garwood.

== Biography ==
After graduating in 1918, Muir-Wood researched the shelled marine animals known as brachiopods at University College. In 1919, she took a part-time job at the London Natural History Museum (then the Natural History department of the British Museum), and was appointed head of the brachiopod collection in 1920 . She rose through the ranks of geology assistants to become, in 1955, the first woman appointed Deputy Keeper of Palaeontology for the museum. She officially retired in 1961, but she continued to do some work at the museum for another four years.

Muir-Wood was an authority on brachiopods, especially fossil types found in the British isles, the Middle East, India, and Malaysia. For three years during the Second World War she worked with the Admiralty in Bath, but maintained her research interests through fossil collecting in the area. She also worked on classification system for Mesozoic species and genera in the 1930s, which was considered pioneering.

She published extensively on brachiopods, and travelled to the US twice to work on a study of the Productoidea with G. Arthur Cooper of the Smithsonian Institution. When the work was published in 1960 as “Morphology, classification and life habits of the Productoidea (Brachiopoda)”, it “was quickly recognized by brachiopod workers as being one of the greatest contributions to the studv of the phylum.” Mui-Wood was then invited to co-author the section on brachiopods in the 1965 survey Treatise on Invertebrate Paleontology.

Muir-Wood was awarded the Lyell Fund by the Geological Society of London in 1930 and the Lyell Medal in 1958. On her retirement in 1965, she was awarded the Order of the British Empire for her services to the museum.

Muir-Wood died of a stroke in Hampstead in 1968, aged 72.

== Selected publications ==
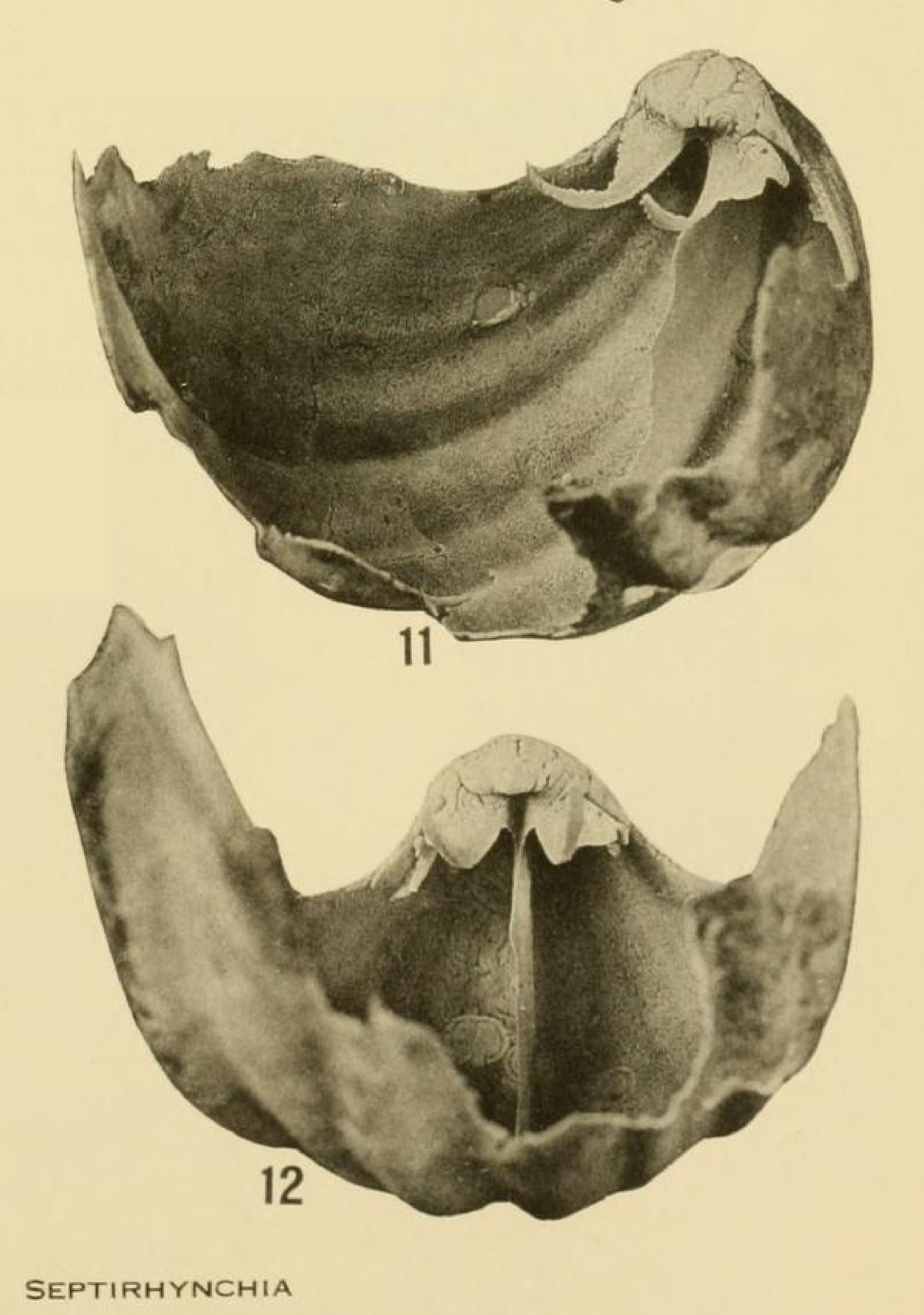
Two views of the brachial valve of Septirhynchia pulchra, from Muir-Wood and Cooper (1951).

- Lang, William Dickson; Spath, Leonard Frank; Cox, Leslie Reginald; Muir-Wood, Helen Marguerite (1928). "The Belemnite Marls of Charmouth, a Series in the Lias of the Dorset Coast". Quarterly Journal of the Geological Society. 84 (1–4): 179–222. doi:10.1144/GSL.JGS.1928.084.01-04.06. S2CID 131695455.
- Muir-Wood, Helen M. (1934). "On the internal structure of some Mesozoic Brachiopoda". Philosophical Transactions of the Royal Society of London, Series B. 223 (494–508): 511–567. Bibcode:1934RSPTB.223..511M. doi:10.1098/rstb.1934.0012. JSTOR 92240.
- —— (1935). "Jurassic Brachiopoda". The Mesozoic Palaeontology of British Somaliland, Geology and Palaeontology of British Somaliland Volume 2. London: Colonial Office. pp. 75–147.
- —— (1936). "A Monograph on the Brachiopoda of the British Great Oolite Series. Part I. The Brachiopoda of the Fuller's Earth". Monographs of the Palaeontographical Society. 89 (404): i-144. doi:10.1080/02693445.1936.12035649.
- —— (1948). Malayan Lower Carboniferous fossils and their bearing on the Visean palaeogeography of Asia. London: British Museum (Natural History).
- ——; Cooper, Gustav Arthur (1951). "A new species of the Jurassic brachiopod genus Septirhynchia". Smithsonian Miscellaneous Collections. 116 (6).
- —— (1955). A history of the classification of the phylum Brachiopoda. London: British Museum (Natural History).
- —— (1959). Report on the Brachiopoda of the John Murray Expedition. John Murray Expeditions 1933-34 Scientific Reports. Vol. X, No 6. London: British Museum (Natural History). pp. 283–317.
- —— (1962). On the Morphology and Classification of the Brachiopod suborder Chonetoidea. London: British Museum (Natural History).
