= Finlay Lorimer Kitchin =

Finlay Lorimer Kitchin FGS, FRS (3 December 1870, Whitehaven, UK – 20 January 1934, London, UK) was a British geologist and paleontologist.

Kitchin was educated at St. Bees School and then at St. John’s College, Cambridge, where he received his B.A. in 1893, M.A. in 1898, and Sc.D. in 1924. At Cambridge he studied geology and palaeontology from 1890 to 1894 and then went to the Ludwig-Maximilians-Universität München, where he studied paleontology under Karl Alfred von Zittel and received a doctoral degree (Promotion) in 1897. His doctoral dissertation is a study of Jurassic fossils discovered in the Cutch State and sent for examination by the Geological Survey of India. After returning to England, he worked unofficially for a short time in the British Museum of Natural History. He worked for the British Geological Survey from 1890 to 1905 as assistant paleontologist and from 1905 to 1934 as paleontologist. He was promoted in 1905 as the successor of E. T. Newton upon the latter's retirement.

Kitchin was elected in 1894 a Fellow of the Geographical Society and in 1929 a Fellow of the Royal Society. He was awarded the Lyell Medal shortly before his death in 1934.

He was an accomplished musician and an authority on the construction of pipe-organs, as well as an authority on developments in locomotive design.
