= Charles McMahon =

Charles McMahon may refer to:

- Charles Alexander McMahon (1830–1904), Anglo-Irish soldier, geologist, and administrator in British India
- Charles McMahon (1953–1975), United States soldier killed in Vietnam: see Charles McMahon and Darwin Judge
- Charlie McMahon (born 1951), Australian didgeridoo player
- Charles McMahon (politician), American politician
- Charlie McMahon (hurler) (1904–1987), Irish hurler

== See also ==
- Charles MacMahon (disambiguation)
- Chuck McMann (1951–2021), Canadian football player
