= Charles MacMahon =

Charles MacMahon is the name of:

- Charles MacMahon (politician) (1824–1891), Australian politician and Chief Commissioner of Victoria Police
- Charles McMahon (1830–1904), an Anglo-Irish soldier, geologist, and administrator in British India.
- Charles MacMahon (theatre) (1861–1917), Australian theatrical entrepreneur and filmmaker
- Members of the MacMahon family
  - Charles Laure MacMahon, 2nd Marquis de MacMahon (1752–1830)
  - Charles Marie MacMahon, 3rd Marquis de MacMahon (1793–1845)
  - Charles Henri MacMahon, 4th Marquis de MacMahon (1828–1863)
  - Charles Marie MacMahon, 5th Marquis de MacMahon (1856–1894)

== See also ==
- Charles McMahon (disambiguation)
- Chuck McMann (1951–2021), Canadian football player
