= Frederick William Rudler =

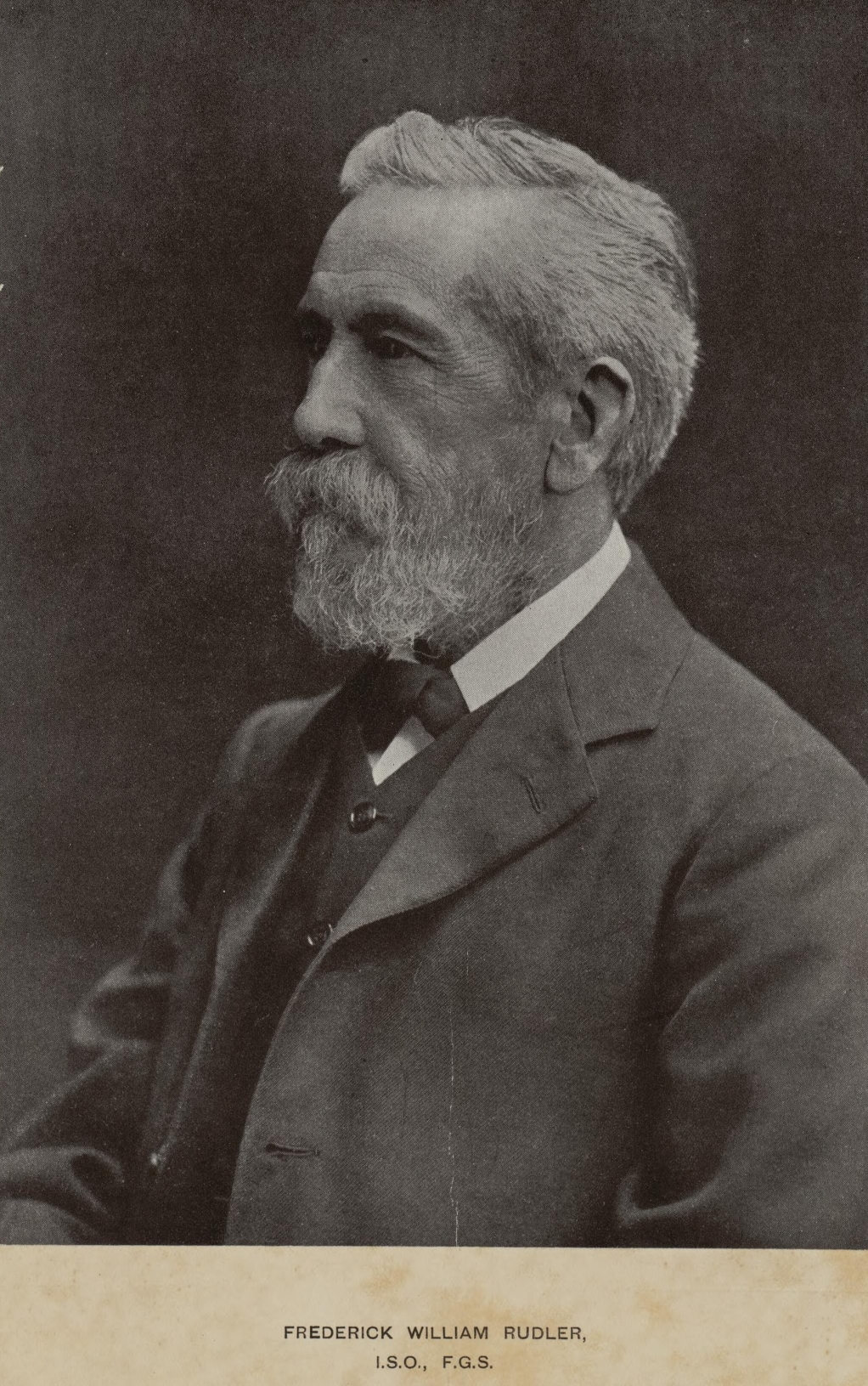
- Rudler in 1910
- Born: 8 July 1840
- Died: 23 January 1915 (aged 74)

Frederick William Rudler FGS FRAI (8 July 1840 – 23 January 1915) was an English mineralogist, geologist, anthropologist, and natural scientist.

He was born on 8 July 1840 in London. After completing education at the Regent Street Royal Polytechnic Institution, Rudler was appointed in 1861 Assistant Curator at the Museum of Practical Geology in Jermyn Street, London and remained in that post until 1876. From 1876 to 1879 he was lecturer at University College of Wales, Aberystwyth. In addition to lecturing, Rudler established the College Museum, housed in the College building on the seafront (the museum was destroyed by a fire in July 1885). His intention was to found a central or national museum for Wales in Aberystwyth concentrating particularly on the mining industries and by appeals for gifts he amassed large numbers of geological, palaeontological and botanical specimens. He returned to London in 1879 and until his retirement in 1902 he was the curator and librarian of the Museum of Practical Geology.

Rudler was elected a Fellow of the Geological Society in 1870 and received the Society's Lyell Medal in 1903. He was president in 1880 of the anthropological department of the British Association, in 1887–1889 of the Geologists' Association, and in 1898–1899 of the Royal Anthropological Institute. He contributed numerous articles to Ure's Dictionary of Arts, Manufactures, and Mines (1875), Thorpe's Dictionary of Applied Chemistry, Muir's Dictionary of Chemistry, the Encyclopædia Britannica (1911), and prestigious journals.

Rudler died in Tatsfield, Surrey, on 23 January 1915.

== Legacy ==
The student geological society at University College of Wales was named 'The Rudler Club' in honour of Rudler having been the first appointed geology lecturer at the College.

== Selected publications ==
- with George G. Chisholm: Europe. Stanford's Compendium of Geography and Travel, based on Hellwald's 'Die Erde und ihre Völker'. London: E. Stanford. 1885; ed. by Sir Andrew C. Ramsay, with ethnological appendix by A.H. Keane
- A handbook to a collection of the minerals of the British Islands, mostly selected from the Ludlam collection, in the Museum of practical geology. London. 1905.
