= Derek Ager =

British palaeontologist (1923–1993)

Derek Victor Ager (21 April 1923 – 8 February 1993) was a British geologist and palaeontologist, student of the Jurassic system and a brachiopodologist, largely known as the one who reintroduced the idea of catastrophism into scientific circulation.

== Biographic data ==
Ager grew up in London, and attended the John Lyon school in Harrow on the Hill. From 1941 to 1946, he served with the Royal Tank Regiment. He is reported to have found his first fossil while excavating a trench in Crag Group sediments in Suffolk. After the end of World War II, Ager travelled to India, where he stayed for a year, during which time he was an instructor in a regimental school in the foothills of the Himalaya.

After he returned to England, Ager obtained a BSc in geology from Chelsea Polytechnic in 1951. He then moved to Imperial College London, where he obtained his PhD in 1954 and a DSc degree in 1968. His doctoral student was Paul Copper. In 1969, Ager was appointed to a chair in geology and the position of head of department at University College, Swansea, a position he held until 1985.

== Service and awards ==
Ager was an active member of both the Geologists' Association, and of the South Wales group of the Geologists' association. He was president of the Geologists' Association from 1974 to 1976, and chair of the South Wales group from 1978 to 1980. He was awarded the Murchison Fund of the Geological Society of London in 1960 and the Foulerton Award of the Geologists' Association in 1969. In 1979, he received the Lyell Medal of the Geological Society, followed by an Honorary DSc from the Sorbonne in 1981.

In 1993, Ager was to be an honorary president of the First European Palaeontological Congress in Lyon, but did not live to see it; the congress was dedicated to his memory.

== Significance in the history of science ==
=== Scientific achievements ===
Ager was the author of numerous works on brachiopod systematics and introduced several taxa within the order Rhynchonellida, for example the family Norellidae Ager, 1959 (originally as a subfamily) and the genus Austrirhynchia Ager, 1959. He was the author of the first English-language textbook on palaeoecology. He also worked on general issues of the Earth sciences, such as the relationship between uniformitarianism and catastrophism, pioneering the rediscovery of the latter after many decades of disregard.

=== Selected publications ===
- A monograph of the British Liassic Rhynchonellidæ (1956–1967)
- Principles of Paleoecology (1963)
- The nature of the stratigraphical record (1973, 1993)
- Geology of Europe (1980)

=== Reception of his writings ===
Some of Ager's books reached wide audiences. His 1973 book, The nature of the stratigraphical record was described as 'brief, cheerful, iconoclastic and compelling' by a reviewer, writing in Scientific American. This book was also eminently quotable, written in eight pithy chapters, each summed up in an aphorism that captured the essence of the essay. Of these, perhaps the best known is the quote Nothing is worldwide, but everything is episodic .... The history of any one part of the earth, like the life of a soldier, consists of long periods of boredom and short periods of terror.

== Legacy ==
In 1993, a special volume of the journal Palaeogeography, Palaeoclimatology, Palaeoecology, of which he was editor for 25 years, was dedicated to him.

Four genera of fossil organisms were named in his honour: the Jurassic thecideide brachiopod Agerinella Pajaud & Patrulius, 1964, the Jurassic bivalve Agerchlamys Damborenea, 1993, the Cretaceous gastropod Ageria Abbass, 1973, and the Jurassic foraminifer Agerella Turvey, 2003 (= Agerina Farinacci, 1991 non Tjernvik, 1956); as well as a number of species, among which the Early Jurassic brachiopod Tetrarhynchia ageri Rousselle & Bisch, 1967 (current name Gibbirhynchia ageri).
