= William Wickham King =

English Geologist

William Wickham King (30 May 1862 – 11 December 1959), usually known as Wickham King, was a distinguished amateur geologist, a Fellow of the Geological Society for 50 years.

He was the younger son of William Henry King and followed him as a solicitor in Stourbridge and magistrates clerk for the Stourbridge and Kingswinford Petty Sessional Divisions. As shown by his own researches, his mother Jane was a daughter of Thomas Firmstone and Sarah Pearson, and granddaughter of Joseph Firmstone of Bilston, patriarch of the Wordsley ironfounders of that name.

As a young man, he rowed with Bewdley rowing club, but came to grief one day when his penny-farthing bicycle broke under him. He also climbed in the Alps and Cuillins, where King's Chimney and King's Cave Gully are named after him. Wickham King was a prominent member of the London Alpine Club and the Scottish Mountaineering Club, joining the latter in 1891. He was a competent alpinist, with at least half of his ascents being made guideless.

His interest in geology began when he found a fossil on the Clent Hills. This led to his attending classes provided by Birmingham University. His first published paper was on the Clent Breccia in 1893. This was followed by others on aspects of the Black Country or South Staffordshire Coalfield. He also produced a plexographic map of the Thick Coal in it.

His most important work was on the Old Red Sandstone, which was then believed to be barren of fossils. His work on this in Shropshire and elsewhere, particularly at Earnstrey east of Brown Clee Hill led to him discovering fossils of a fish, named Corvaspis Kingi.

His later papers included 'The Downtonian and Dittonian Strata of Great Britain and North-Western Europe' Quarterly Journal of the Geological Society 90 (1934), pp. 526ff.

At the beginning of the Second World War, he retired to Devon and continued his geological work there, including producing a 25-inch geological map of the Abberley area. On completing this he gave his collections to Birmingham University, where they form part of the collections of the Lapworth Museum of Geology.

== Awards ==
In 1924 he was awarded the Lyell Medal by the Geological Society of London. Birmingham University awarded him an honorary M.Sc. degree, the unusual award.
