= Samuel Allport =

English petrologist

- Born: January 23, 1816; Birmingham, England
- Died: July 7, 1897 (aged 81); Cheltenham, England
- Scientific career
- Fields: Petrology
- Institutions: University of Birmingham

Samuel Allport (January 23, 1816 – July 7, 1897) was an English petrologist.

== Life ==
He was born in Birmingham and educated in that city.

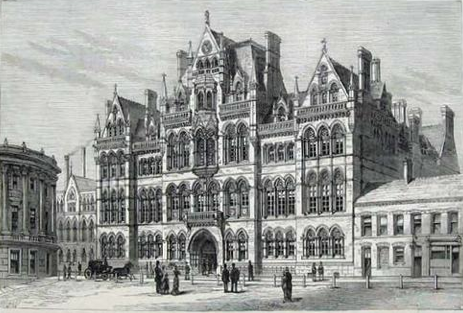
Mason Science College, now the University of Birmingham

Although occupied in business during the greater portion of his life, his leisure was given to geological studies, and when residing for a short period in Bahia, South America, he made observations on the geology, published by the Geological Society in 1860. His chief work was in microscopic petrology, to the study of which he was attracted by the investigations of Dr. Henry Sorby; and he became one of the pioneers of this branch of geology, preparing his own rock-sections with remarkable skill.

The basalts of south Staffordshire, the diorites of Warwickshire, the phonolite of the Wolf Rock (to which he first directed attention), the pitchstones of Arran and the altered igneous rocks near the Land's End were investigated and described by him during the years 1869–1879 in the Quarterly Journal of the Geological Society and in the Geological Magazine. In 1880 he was appointed librarian in Mason Science College (which later became the University of Birmingham), a post which he relinquished on account of ill-health in 1887. In that year the Lyell Medal was awarded to him by the Geological Society. A few years later he retired to Cheltenham, where he died in 1897.
