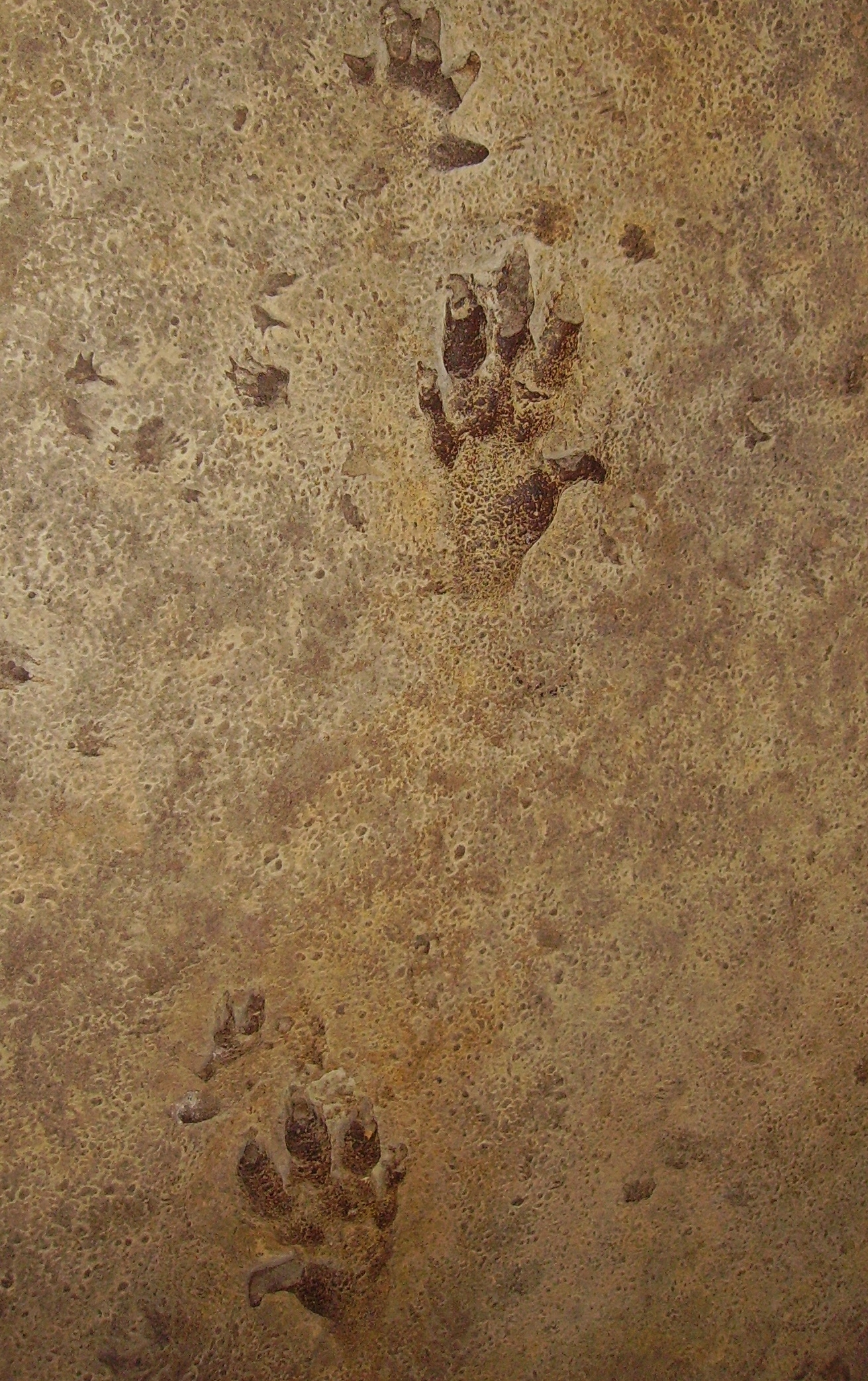
- Cheirotherium trace fossil, displayed in Oxford University Museum of Natural History

Trace fossil classification
- Kingdom: Animalia
- Phylum: Chordata
- Class: Reptilia
- Clade: Pseudosuchia
- Ichnofamily: †Chirotheriidae
- Ichnogenus: †Chirotherium; Kaup, 1835

Type ichnospecies
- †Chirotherium barthii Kaup, 1835

Ichnospecies
- †Chirotherium barthii Kaup, 1835; †Chirotherium sickleri Kaup, 1835; †Chirotherium stortonense Morton, 1863; †Chirotherium vorbachi Kirchner, 1927; †Chirotherium beasleyi Peabody, 1948; †Chirotherium moquinense Peabody, 1956; †Chirotherium rex Peabody, 1948; †Chirotherium lulli Bock, 1952; †Chirotherium wondrai Heller, 1952; †Chirotherium swinnertoni (Sarjeant, 1970); †Chirotherium courelli DeMathieu, 1970; †Chirotherium atlensis Biron & Dutuit, 1981; †Chirotherium mediterraneum DeMathieu & Durand, 1991

Synonyms
- Chirosaurus Kaup, 1835; Cheirotherium Sickler, 1836; Cheirotherion Nopcsa, 1923; Krokodilipus Nopcsa, 1923; Saurichnites Kirchner, 1927

= Chirotherium =

Chirotherium Temporal range: 245–205 Ma

Trace fossil

Chirotherium, also known as Cheirotherium (‘hand-beast’), is a Triassic trace fossil consisting of five-fingered (pentadactyle) footprints and whole tracks. These look, by coincidence, remarkably like the hands of apes and bears, with the outermost toe having evolved to extend out to the side like a thumb, although probably only functioning to provide a firmer grip in mud. Chirotherium tracks were first found in 1834 in Lower Triassic sandstone (Buntsandstein) in Thuringia, Germany, dating from about 243 million years ago (mya).

The creatures who made the footprints and tracks were probably pseudosuchian archosaurs related to the ancestors of the crocodiles. They likely belonged to either prestosuchidae or rauisuchidae groups, which were both large carnivores with semi-erect gaits.

== History ==
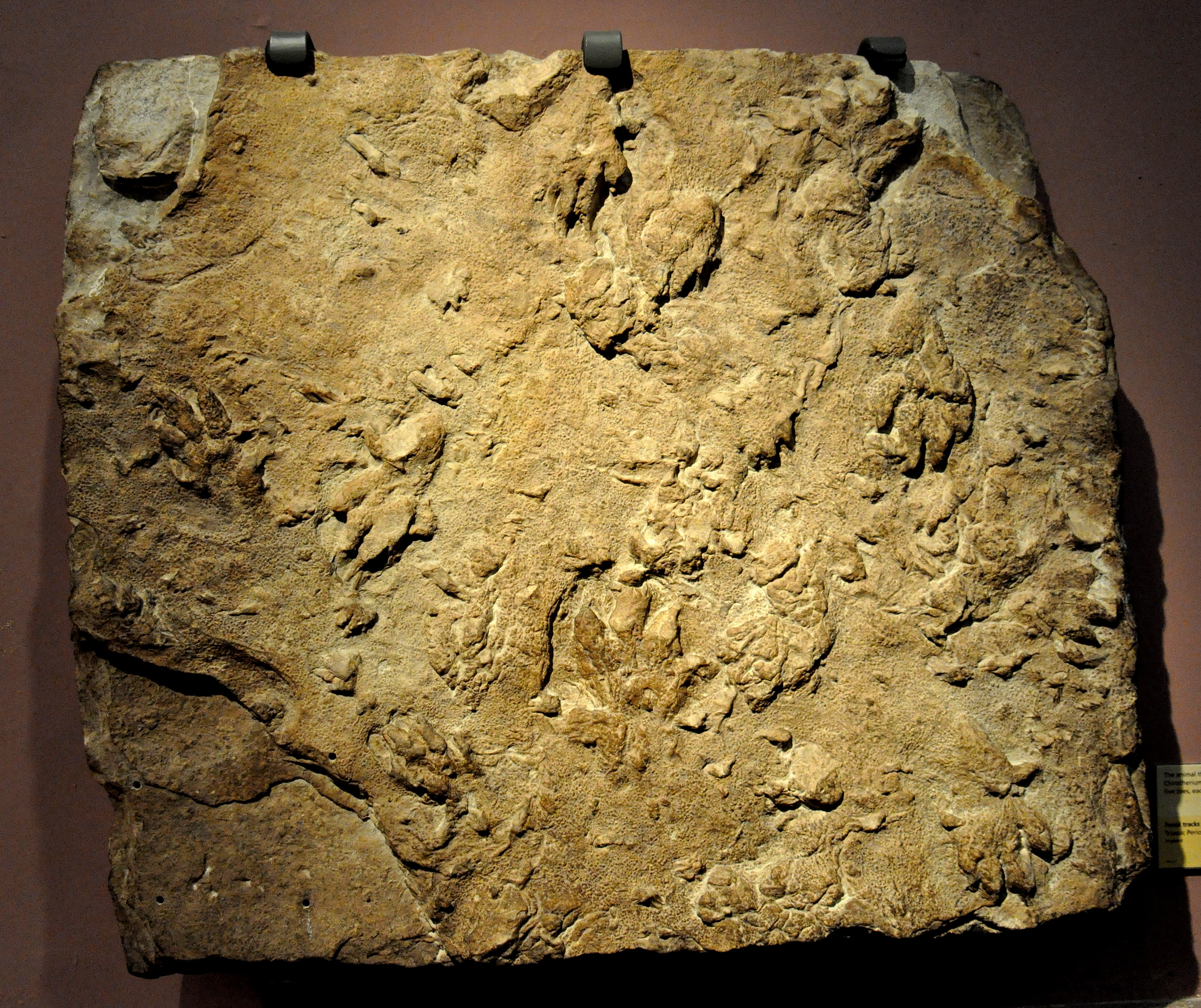
Fossil track of a Chirotherium. Triassic Period. From England. Kelvingrove Art Gallery and Museum, Glasgow, UK

Chirotherium tracks were first found in German Triassic sandstones in 1834, and later in England in 1838. They were found before dinosaurs were known and initial models of the trackmaker proposed that it was a bear or ape, which walked with its feet crossed. This proposal was necessary to explain the toe on the outside. The tracks were also proposed to be from a marsupial. These fossil tracks have now been found on North America, Argentina, North Africa, Europe, and China.

British paleontologist Richard Owen suggested in 1842 that the tracks were made by a labyrinthodont amphibian. Over the following years, new discoveries of archosaurian reptiles indicated that Chirotherium tracks were made by a pseudosuchian. The print's resemblance to mammals was only superficial; in reality, an external (lateral) ‘thumb’ was commonplace among Triassic archosaurs.

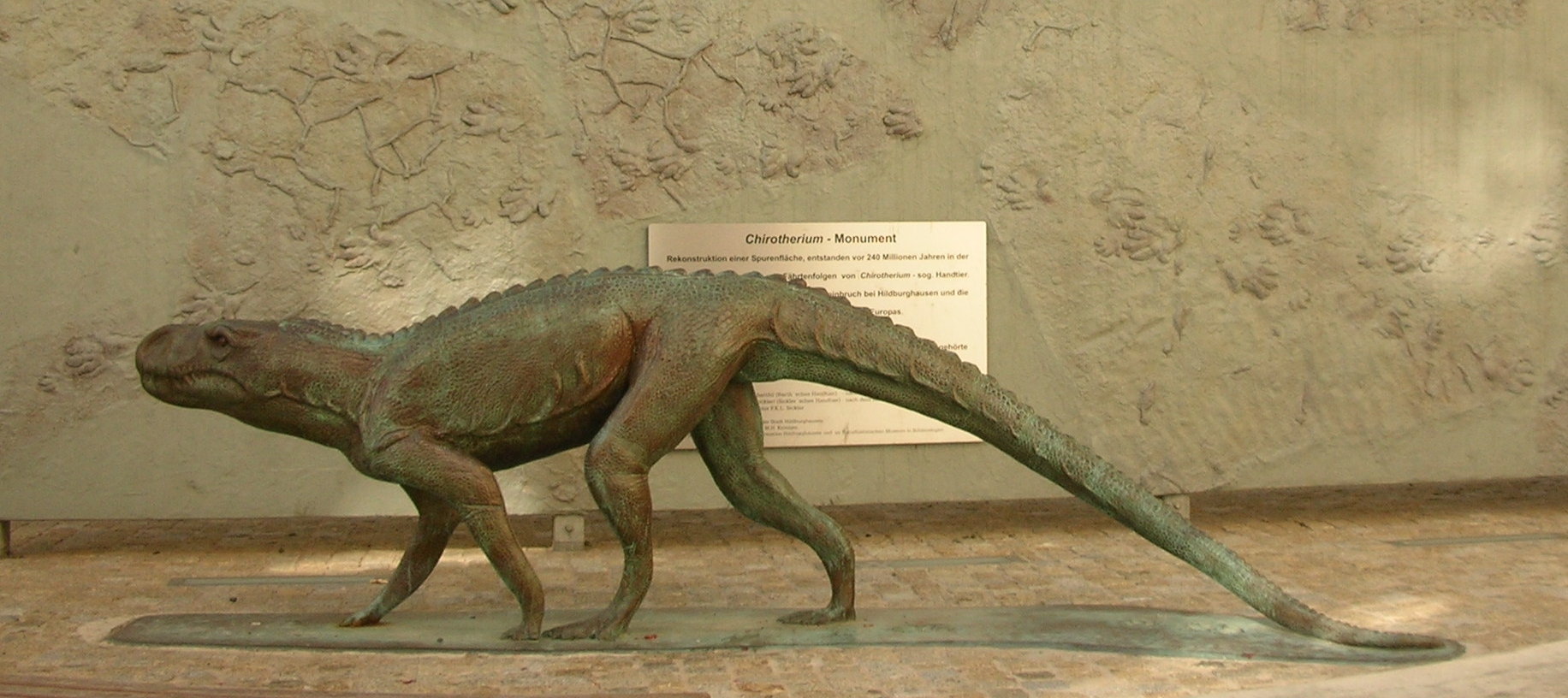
Chirotherium monument in Hildburghausen, Germany, with reconstruction of the original track-bearing bedding plane based upon which the ichnogenus Chirotherium was first described in 1834 and named in 1835.

In 1965, the skeleton of an animal probably closely related to the trackmaker of Chirotherium was found, called Ticinosuchus. It had the external toe on its hind feet but not on its front feet and was possibly a more derived descendant, whose gait did not require a stabilizing front toe. Footprints of different size and proportions occurring together on one and the same bedding plane probably reflect a sex difference (sexual dimorphism) within the trackmaker species.

Other Chirotheriidae include Isocheirotherium.

== Paleobiology ==
Chirotherium trackways have been found in German sandstones that were likely deposited on flood plains. During the Middle Triassic, much of Central Europe was covered by a shallow epicontinental sea (the so-called Muschelkalk Sea). In one location, Chirotherium trackways were found alongside those of early horseshoe crabs. The horseshoe crabs were likely breeding along the intertidal zone while the Chirotherium trackmaker preyed on them during low tide. Smaller reptiles like Macrocnemus, represented by the ichnogenus Rhynchosauroides, likely fed on the horseshoe crabs’ eggs.

== See also ==
- Ichnite
