= Sidney Hugh Reynolds =

English geologist, paleontologist and zoologist

Sidney Hugh Reynolds DSc, FGS (18 December 1867 – 20 August 1949) was an English geologist, paleontologist, and zoologist who was born in Brighton. He died in Clifton, Bristol, aged 81 leaving behind a widow and a daughter.

== Education and career ==
Reynolds was educated at Marlborough College and Trinity College, Cambridge, where he received B.A. (Nat. Sci. Tripos, Pt I, 1st Class) 1889; (Pt II, 1st Class, 1890); M.A. 1894; Sc.D. 1913. He was acting professor of zoology at Madras Christian College in 1891–1892 and in 1897–1898. He taught Geology and Zoology at the University of Bristol in 1894 where he became an assistant professor in 1899 and then a professor in 1900. In 1910 he was appointed the chair of geology, a position held until he retired as professor emeritus in 1933. Following his retirement as a professor, Reynolds went on to become the curator of the Stroud District Cowle Museum.

== Selected publications ==
- A Geological Excursion Handbook for the Bristol District. Bristol: J.W. Arrowsmith. 1912.
- The Vertebrate Skeleton. Cambridge biological series. Cambridge University Press. 1897.
- British Pleistocene Mammalia. Collected Monographs, 1906, 1909, 1911, etc. London: The Palaeontographical Society.

== Photography ==
- Photographs by Reynolds are held in the Conway Library at the Courtauld Institute of Art, and are currently being digitised.
- He catalogued 5 photograph albums of the Orient and France, 1880-1925 for Bristol University Special Collections.
- Reynolds sat for a half-plate nitrate negative by Lafayette in 1929.

== Awards ==
Reynolds was the president of Section "G" of the British Association in 1926. He was awarded the Lyell Medal in 1928. (In the same year William Dickson Lang was also awarded the Lyell Medal for work done independently.)
