= Colin Ballantyne =

Scottish geomorphologist

Colin Kerr Ballantyne (born 7 June 1951 in Glasgow, Scotland) is a Scottish geomorphologist, geologist, and physical geographer.

== Education and career ==
Colin K. Ballantyne graduated in 1973 with an M.A. from the University of Glasgow, where he studied geomorphology and Quaternary geology. Ballantyne graduated in 1975 with an MSc from Ontario's McMaster University, where he was part of a team studying high arctic hydrology and fluvial processes. In 1975 Ballantyne returned to Scotland and became a graduate student at the University of Edinburgh. There he graduated in 1980 with a PhD thesis on the periglacial geomorphology of mountains in northwestern Scotland. His PhD thesis was supervised by Brian Sissons (1926–2018).

At the University of St Andrews, Ballantyne was a lecturer in geography from 1980 to 1989, a senior lecturer in geography and geology from 1989 to 1994, and a professor of physical geography from 1994 to 31 January 2015, when he retired as professor emeritus. In the School of Geography and Geosciences of the University of St Andrews, he was the head from 1998 to 2000 and the director of research from 2007 and 2012. Since 2000 he is a guest professor at University Centre Svalbard in Svalbard, Norway. He was twice an Erskine Fellow at New Zealand's University of Canterbury, where he has taught summer school courses over many years. As a professor at the University of St Andrews, Ballantyne conducted annual honours field courses in Norway – on one such occasion his students included the future Duke of Cambridge.

== Research ==
Ballantyne is the author or co-author of more than 150 articles in refereed journals. Much of Ballantyne's reputation is based upon his reconstruction of the extent and deglaciation chronology of the last British-Irish ice sheet and his 2002 model of paraglacial landscape modification. He and his co-workers have done research on geomorphological mapping, glaciation, and periglaciation, as well as many related topics such as frost weathering, nivation, solifluction, hydrology, debris flow, rockfall, slope stability, and wind erosion. He was the co-author, with Charles Harris, of The Periglaciation of Great Britain (Cambridge University Press, 1994), which for the next two decades was an essential reference for periglacial research in the British Isles. In the Hebrides, Ballantyne single-handedly did field mapping and theoretical reconstruction of former glacier limits on all the major islands between Orkney and Arran. In 2012 he was the co-author, with Derek Fabel and Sheng Xu, of an important article that presented convincing evidence that periglacial trimlines, instead of representing the maximum altitude of the last ice sheet, actually represent thermal boundaries which separated wet-based ice at pressure melting point from cold-based ice on summit plateaus. The evidence consisted of establishing the dates of high-level erratic boulders above trimlines on five mountains in northwestern Scotland and empirically demonstrating that the last ice sheet overtopped the five mountains.

== Personal life ==
Ballantyne is a mountain climber. He climbed all the Scottish Munros at least twice. He ascended Mount Kilimanjaro and climbed many mountains in New Zealand and Europe, including many of Norway's peaks over 2000 meters. Accompanied by Chris Bonington, he ascended Mount Elbrus.

Ballantyne married Rebecca Josephine Trengove in August 1996. They have a son and a daughter.

== Awards and honours ==
Ballantyne received in 1986 the Warwick Award and in 1999 the Wiley Award of the British Society for Geomorphology (formerly the British Geomorphological Research Group). The Royal Scottish Geographical Society (RSGS) awarded him in 1990 the RSGS's President's Medal, in 1991 the Newbigin Prize, and in 2015 the Coppock Research Medal. In 1996 he received the Saltire Society's Scottish Science Award and was elected a Fellow of the Royal Society of Edinburgh and a Fellow of the Royal Society of Arts. In 2000 he was awarded a D.Sc. from the University of St Andrews. In 2010 the Edinburgh Geological Society awarded him the Clough Medal. In 2015 the Geological Society of London awarded him the Lyell Medal.

== Selected publications ==
=== Articles ===
- Ballantyne, C. K.; Wain-Hobson, Timothy (1980). "The Loch Lomond Advance on the Island of Rhum". Scottish Journal of Geology. 16 (1): 1–10. Bibcode:1980ScJG...16....1B. doi:10.1144/sjg16010001.
- Ballantyne, C.K. (1984). "The Late Devensian periglaciation of upland Scotland". Quaternary Science Reviews. 3 (4): 311–343. Bibcode:1984QSRv....3..311B. doi:10.1016/0277-3791(84)90011-8.
- Ballantyne, Colin K. (1986). "Landslides and slope failures in Scotland: A review". Scottish Geographical Magazine. 102 (3): 134–150. doi:10.1080/00369228618736667.
- Ballantyne, Colin K. (1989). "The Loch Lomond Readvance on the Isle of Skye, Scotland: Glacier reconstruction and palaeoclimatic implications". Journal of Quaternary Science. 4 (2): 95–108. Bibcode:1989JQS.....4...95B. doi:10.1002/jqs.3390040201.
- Benn, Douglas I.; Ballantyne, Colin K. (1993). "The description and representation of particle shape". Earth Surface Processes and Landforms. 18 (7): 665–672. Bibcode:1993ESPL...18..665B. doi:10.1002/esp.3290180709.
- Benn, Douglas I.; Ballantyne, Colin K. (1994). "Reconstructing the transport history of glacigenic sediments: A new approach based on the co-variance of clast form indices". Sedimentary Geology. 91 (1–4): 215–227. Bibcode:1994SedG...91..215B. doi:10.1016/0037-0738(94)90130-9.
- Stone, John O.; Ballantyne, Colin K.; Keith Fifield, L. (1998). "Exposure dating and validation of periglacial weathering limits, northwest Scotland". Geology. 26 (7): 587. Bibcode:1998Geo....26..587S. doi:10.1130/0091-7613(1998)026<0587:EDAVOP>2.3.CO;2.
- Ballantyne, Colin K.; McCarroll, Danny; Nesje, Atle; Dahl, Svein Olaf; Stone, John O. (1998). "The Last Ice Sheet in North-West Scotland: Reconstruction and Implications". Quaternary Science Reviews. 17 (12): 1149–1184. Bibcode:1998QSRv...17.1149B. doi:10.1016/S0277-3791(98)00003-1.
- Ballantyne, Colin K. (2002). "A general model of paraglacial landscape response". The Holocene. 12 (3): 371–376. Bibcode:2002Holoc..12..371B. doi:10.1191/0959683602hl553fa.
- Ballantyne, Colin K. (2002). "Paraglacial geomorphology". Quaternary Science Reviews. 21 (18–19): 1935–2017. Bibcode:2002QSRv...21.1935B. doi:10.1016/S0277-3791(02)00005-7. (over 1400 citations)
- Benn, Douglas I.; Ballantyne, Colin K. (2005). "Palaeoclimatic reconstruction from Loch Lomond Readvance glaciers in the West Drumochter Hills, Scotland". Journal of Quaternary Science. 20 (6): 577–592. Bibcode:2005JQS....20..577B. doi:10.1002/jqs.925.
- Ballantyne, Colin K.; McCarroll, Danny; Stone, John O. (2007). "The Donegal ice dome, northwest Ireland: Dimensions and chronology". Journal of Quaternary Science. 22 (8): 773–783. Bibcode:2007JQS....22..773B. doi:10.1002/jqs.1116.
- Ballantyne, Colin Kerr (2008). "After the Ice: Holocene Geomorphic Activity in the Scottish Highlands". Scottish Geographical Journal. 124 (1): 8–52. Bibcode:2008ScGJ..124....8B. doi:10.1080/14702540802300167.
- Ballantyne, Colin K. (2010). "Extent and deglacial chronology of the last British–Irish Ice Sheet: Implications of exposure dating using cosmogenic isotopes". Journal of Quaternary Science. 25 (4): 515–534. Bibcode:2010JQS....25..515B. doi:10.1002/jqs.1310.
- Ballantyne, Colin K.; Stone, John O. (2012). "Did large ice caps persist on low ground in north-west Scotland during the Lateglacial Interstade?". Journal of Quaternary Science. 27 (3): 297–306. Bibcode:2012JQS....27..297B. doi:10.1002/jqs.1544.
- Fabel, Derek; Ballantyne, Colin K.; Xu, Sheng (2012). "Trimlines, blockfields, mountain-top erratics and the vertical dimensions of the last British–Irish Ice Sheet in NW Scotland". Quaternary Science Reviews. 55: 91–102. Bibcode:2012QSRv...55...91F. doi:10.1016/j.quascirev.2012.09.002.
- Ballantyne, Colin K. (2012). "Chronology of glaciation and deglaciation during the Loch Lomond (Younger Dryas) Stade in the Scottish Highlands: Implications of recalibrated ^{10}Be exposure ages". Boreas. 41 (4): 513–526. Bibcode:2012Borea..41..513B. doi:10.1111/j.1502-3885.2012.00253.x.
- Chiverrell, Richard C.; Thrasher, Ian M.; Thomas, Geoffrey S. P.; Lang, Andreas; Scourse, James D.; Van Landeghem, Katrien J. J.; McCarroll, Danny; Clark, Chris D.; Cofaigh, Colm Ó.; Evans, David J. A.; Ballantyne, Colin K. (2013). "Bayesian modelling the retreat of the Irish Sea Ice Stream". Journal of Quaternary Science. 28 (2): 200–209. Bibcode:2013JQS....28..200C. doi:10.1002/jqs.2616.
- Ballantyne, Colin K.; Stone, John O. (2013). "Timing and periodicity of paraglacial rock-slope failures in the Scottish Highlands". Geomorphology. 186: 150–161. Bibcode:2013Geomo.186..150B. doi:10.1016/j.geomorph.2012.12.030.
- Ballantyne, Colin K.; Wilson, Peter; Gheorghiu, Delia; Rodés, Àngel (2014). "Enhanced rock-slope failure following ice-sheet deglaciation: Timing and causes". Earth Surface Processes and Landforms. 39 (7): 900–913. Bibcode:2014ESPL...39..900B. doi:10.1002/esp.3495. hdl:10023/5839.
- Ballantyne, Colin K.; Sandeman, Graeme F.; Stone, John O.; Wilson, Peter (2014). "Rock-slope failure following Late Pleistocene deglaciation on tectonically stable mountainous terrain". Quaternary Science Reviews. 86: 144–157. Bibcode:2014QSRv...86..144B. doi:10.1016/j.quascirev.2013.12.021. hdl:10023/5169.
- Ballantyne, Colin K. (2019). "After the ice: Lateglacial and Holocene landforms and landscape evolution in Scotland". Earth and Environmental Science Transactions of the Royal Society of Edinburgh. 110 (1–2): 133–171. Bibcode:2019EESTR.110..133B. doi:10.1017/S175569101800004X. hdl:10023/16465.

=== Books and monographs ===
- Blachut, S. P.; Ballantyne, C. K. (1976). Ice-dammed lakes : a critical review of their nature and behaviour. Discussion paper no. 6, Department of Geography, McMaster University. Hamilton, Ontario. LCCN 79317558; vii+90 pages, illustrated
- Ballantyne, C. K.; Harris, Charles (1994). The Periglaciation of Great Britain. CUP Archive. ISBN 978-0-521-31016-1. LCCN 92043477.
- Ballantyne, C. K.; Lowe, J. John, eds. (2016). The Quaternary of Skye: field guide. Quaternary Research Association field guides. Quaternary Research Association. ISBN 9780907780205. book data, University of St Andrews Research Portal
- Ballantyne, Colin K. (16 January 2018). Periglacial Geomorphology. John Wiley & Sons. ISBN 978-1-4051-0006-9. LCCN 2017028826.
- Ballantyne, Colin K. (2019). Scotland's Mountain Landscapes: A Geomorphological Perspective. Dunedin Academic Press.
