= Douglas James Shearman =

Douglas James Shearman (2 July 1918, Isleworth, Middlesex – 12 May 2003, Cassington, Oxfordshire) was a British geologist and sedimentologist, who made significant contributions to the study of evaporites and other sediments and sedimentary rocks in desert climates. His research on evaporites is important for understanding the entrapment and migration of petroleum.

== Education and career ==
After education in Hounslow and at Southend-on-Sea's Southend High School for Boys, Shearman joined the Royal Mail as a trainee engineer. In 1939 he enlisted in the Royal Navy. During his basic training in Dover he met in the NAAFI canteen a young soldier named Tom Pain, who was using a hand lens to examine a terebatulid fossil from the Dover chalk. Discussions over tea and doughnuts inspired Shearman to study geology. During WW II, he served as a radio operator on a minesweeper in the North Atlantic. In 1946 he enrolled at Chelsea Polytechnic, University of London, where he studied geology under William Fleet (1890–1966) and graduated in 1949 with a first class degree.

In 1949 Herbert Harold Read appointed Shearman as assistant lecturer at Imperial College London. There Shearman was promoted in 1951 to lecturer, in 1963 to senior lecturer, and in 1971 to reader. He was awarded a D.Sc. and was a professor of sedimentology from 1978 to 1983, when he retired from Imperial College London as professor emeritus.

== Research ==
From the mid-1950s to the early 1960s, Shearman and his sedimentology research group studied the limestones and dolomites of the French Jura. Shearman with his student Brian Evamy developed staining methods that improved microscopic study of the cementation history of limestones. Shearman and colleagues also pioneered the use trace elements and various methods to study dolomitisation and dedolomitisation of limestones. Their pioneering methods were adopted worldwide. During those years, Shearman's group also focused on research, initiated by Graham Evans (1934–2021), involving inter-tidal sediments of the Wash.

In 1961, Douglas J. Shearman and Graham Evans began to expand their research on tidal and inter-tidal sediments to areas outside England. During work, funded by the UK's DSIR and later by Shell plc, on the Trucial Coast on the Persian Gulf, Shearman's research team recorded the first known example of recent anhydrite. The team showed that anhydrite, previously known only from older rocks, is still being formed today, in tidal environments of what is now called the sabkha environment. In 1965 in a discussion in a joint meeting of the Institute of Petroleum and Geological Society of London, Shearman suggested that the traditionally accepted idea of evaporites deposited from a standing body of water was wrong. Instead, upward moving brines in a thick pile of sabkha sediments produce complex mineralogical replacements in the upper part of the pile while leaving the lower part unaltered – thus producing the vertical sequences found in these evaporite rocks. By the late 1970s the research of Shearman's team convinced sedimentologists that, as salt marshes build out toward the sea, evaporite minerals displace and replace earlier lime sediments. In addition to the research on the sabkha sediments, Shearman did related research in Baja California on inter-tidal laminated halite (salt) deposits and in Canada with John G. C. M. Fuller (1926–2012). Such research allowed sedimentologists to re-interpret ancient evaporite sequences, thus benefiting the petroleum industry. During his years of retirement, Shearman with colleagues did research in the sedimentary basins of Lake Lahontan and Mono Lake on algal mounds containing the mineral ikaite, precursor of various pseudomorphs of ikaite.

== Family ==
In 1949 Douglas J. Shearman married Maureen Pugsley. Upon his death, he was survived by his widow and their two sons and one daughter.

== Awards and honours ==
- Lyell Fund of the Geological Society of London (1967)
- Matson Award of the American Association of Petroleum Geologists (1981)
- Lyell Medal of the Geological Society of London (1984)
- Wollaston Medal of the Geological Society of London (1997)

== Selected publications ==
- Pitcher, W. S.; Shearman, D. J.; Pugh, D. C. (1954). "The Loess of Pegwell Bay, Kent, and its Associated Frost Soils". Geological Magazine. 91 (4): 308–314. Bibcode:1954GeoM...91..308P. doi:10.1017/S0016756800065298.
- Curtis, R.; Evans, G.; Kinsman, D. J. J.; Shearman, D. J. (1963). "Association of Dolomite and Anhydrite in the Recent Sediments of the Persian Gulf". Nature. 197 (4868): 679–680. Bibcode:1963Natur.197..679C. doi:10.1038/197679a0.
- Selley, R. C.; Shearman, D. J.; Sutton, J.; Watson, J. (1963). "Some Underwater Disturbances in the Torridonian of Skye and Raasay". Geological Magazine. 100 (3): 224–243. Bibcode:1963GeoM..100..224S. doi:10.1017/S0016756800055175.
- Evans, G.; Shearman, D. J. (1964). "Recent Celestine from the Sediments of the Trucial Coast of the Persian Gulf". Nature. 202 (4930): 385–386. Bibcode:1964Natur.202..385E. doi:10.1038/202385a0.
- Shearman, D. J.; Skipwith, Patrick A. d'E. (1965). "Organic Matter in Recent and Ancient Limestones and its Role in their Diagenesis". Nature. 208 (5017): 1310–1311. Bibcode:1965Natur.208.1310S. doi:10.1038/2081310a0.
- Shearman, D. J.; Shirmohammadi, N. H. (1969). "Distribution of Strontium in Dedolomites from the French Jura". Nature. 223 (5206): 606–608. Bibcode:1969Natur.223..606S. doi:10.1038/223606a0.
- Shearman, D. J.; Fuller, J. G. (1969). "Anhydrite diagenesis, calcitization, and organic laminites, Winnipegosis formation, Middle Devonian, Saskatchewan". Bulletin of Canadian Petroleum Geology. 17 (4): 496–525.
- Shearman, D.J.; Twyman, J.; Zand Karimi, M. (1970). "The genesis and diagenesis of oolites". Proceedings of the Geologists' Association. 81 (3): 561–575. Bibcode:1970PrGA...81..561S. doi:10.1016/S0016-7878(70)80015-3.
- Dean, Walter E.; Schreiber, B. Charlotte, eds. (1978). "Section 2 (3 chapters). Evaporites of Coastal Sabkhas by D. J. Shearman". Marine Evaporites. doi:10.2110/scn.78.01.0006. ISBN 978-1-56576-233-6.
- Shearman, D. J. (1979). "A field test for identification of gypsum in soils and sediments". Quarterly Journal of Engineering Geology. 12: 51. doi:10.1144/GSL.QJEG.1979.012.01.06.
- Shearman, D. J. (1981). "Displacement of sand grains in sandy gypsum crystals". Geological Magazine. 118 (3): 303–306. Bibcode:1981GeoM..118..303S. doi:10.1017/S0016756800035792.
- Shearman, D.J.; Smith, A.J. (1985). "Ikaite, the parent mineral of jarrowite-type pseudomorphs". Proceedings of the Geologists' Association. 96 (4): 305–314. Bibcode:1985PrGA...96..305S. doi:10.1016/S0016-7878(85)80019-5.
- Gunatilaka, Ananda; Al-Zamel, A.; Shearman, D. J.; Reda, A. (1987). "A Spherulitic Fabric in Selectively Dolomitized Siliciclastic Crustacean Burrows, Northern Kuwait". SEPM Journal of Sedimentary Research. doi:10.1306/212F8CA6-2B24-11D7-8648000102C1865D.
- Shearman, D. J.; McGugan, A.; Stein, C.; Smith, A. J. (1989). "Ikaite, CaCO_{3}⋅6H_{2}O, precursor of the thinolites in the Quaternary tufas and tufa mounds of the Lahontan and Mono Lake Basins, western United States". Geological Society of America Bulletin. 101 (7): 913–917. Bibcode:1989GSAB..101..913S. doi:10.1130/0016-7606(1989)101<0913:ICOPOT>2.3.CO;2.
- Evamy, B. D.; Shearman, D. J. (1990). "The Development of Overgrowths from Echinoderm Fragments". Carbonate Diagenesis. pp. 222–223. doi:10.1002/9781444304510.ch19. ISBN 978-0-632-02938-9.
- Shearman, Douglas J. (1995). "Unusual twinning features in large primary gypsum crystals formed in salt lake conditions, Middle Miocene, Madrid Basin, Spain: Palaeoenvironmental implications — Discussion". Sedimentary Geology. 100 (1–4): 181–182. Bibcode:1995SedG..100..181S. doi:10.1016/0037-0738(95)00093-3.
- Huggett, J.M.; Schultz, B.P.; Shearman, D.J.; Smith, A.J. (2005). "The petrology of ikaite pseudomorphs and their diagenesis". Proceedings of the Geologists' Association. 116 (3–4): 207–220. Bibcode:2005PrGA..116..207H. doi:10.1016/S0016-7878(05)80042-2.
