= Geology Today =

- Discipline: Geology
- Language: English
- Edited by: Peter Doyle

Publication details
- History: 1985–present
- Publisher: Wiley on behalf of the Geologists' Association and the Geological Society of London (United Kingdom)
- Frequency: Bimonthly
- Open access: Hybrid

Standard abbreviations
- ISO 4: Geol. Today

Indexing
- ISSN: 0266-6979 (print); 1365-2451 (web)
- LCCN: 87641803
- OCLC no.: 1029236563

Links
- Journal homepage; Online access; Online archive

Geology Today is a bimonthly peer-reviewed scientific journal published by Wiley on behalf of the Geologists' Association and the Geological Society of London. The editor-in-chief is Peter Doyle (Geological Society of London). The journal covers all aspects of the Earth sciences.

== Abstracting and indexing ==
The journal is abstracted and indexed in Aquatic Sciences and Fisheries Abstracts, EBSCO databases, ProQuest databases, Scopus, and The Zoological Record.
