= Doris Reynolds =

British geologist

Doris Livesey Reynolds
- Born: 1 July 1899; Manchester, United Kingdom
- Died: 10 October 1985 (aged 86); Hove, United Kingdom
- Education: Bedford College
- Awards: FRSE (1949); Lyell Medal (1960)
- Scientific career
- Workplaces: University College London, Queen's University Belfast (1921–1926), Bedford College (1926–1931), Durham University (1931–1942), University of Edinburgh (1943–1956)

Doris Livesey Reynolds (also known by her married name Doris Holmes) FRSE FGS (1 July 1899 – 10 October 1985) was a British geologist, best known for her work on metasomatism in rocks and her role in the "Granite Controversy". She was the first woman to be elected Fellow of the Royal Society of Edinburgh.

== Early life and education ==
Doris Livesey Reynolds was born on 1 July 1899 in Manchester, to parents Alfred Reynolds and Louisa Livesey. Her parents moved to Manchester from Belfast just before her birth. Reynolds first attended school in Essex, then going on to Bedford College, graduating with a degree in geology in 1920. Whilst at Bedford, she studied under two of the most famous female geologists of the time, Catherine Raisin and Gertrude Elles, who encouraged her interest in petrology.

== Geological career and later life ==
Reynolds taught at University College London after graduating, and then at Queen's University Belfast between 1921 and 1926 as assistant to Arthur Dwerryhouse and John Kaye Charlesworth. Her early work focused on the geology of Northern Ireland, in particular the Triassic sandstones of the north-east, where she discovered authigenic potash feldspar. She also worked with albite-schists, discovering the metasomatic origin of albite, which has a correlation with increases of soda. Reynolds work focused on geochemical and structural conditions that contribute to the formation of rocks through metasomatism. Whilst conducting field work on the island of Colonsay, she discovered that the local xenoliths of quartzite in hornblendite were transformed metasomatically into micropegmatite. Reynolds remained fond of Ireland, and travelled there often with her husband during her lifetime. In 1926 she returned as a lecturer to Bedford College, and in 1927 received a D.Sc.

During a field trip with some students to the Ardnamurchan Peninsula in 1931, Reynolds met Arthur Holmes, the Professor of Geology at the University of Durham. She accepted his offer of a teaching post at Durham, and following the death of Holmes' first wife, they married in 1939. When Holmes became Regius Professor of Geology at the University of Edinburgh in 1942, Reynolds became an honorary research fellow. This was an informal and unremunerated teaching and research position within the geology department. Reynolds developed the theory of "granitisation" during the 1940s, in an effort to explain the formation of granite in the Earth's crust. The theory postulated that granite in the Earth's crust formed fluids moving upwards through the crust, changing them into granite chemically. It was a controversial theory which proved divisive until the 1960s in the field of petrology and became known as the "Granite Controversy". The theory was proven incorrect eventually, but inspired research in a previously neglected area of geology.

Holmes died in 1965 and Reynolds went on to publish the revised third edition of his classic textbook Principles of Physical Geology in 1978. In her sixties, Reynolds 'surprised many of her acquaintances by acquiring a car', and using this to travel the country. In 1983, she suffered a major heart attack, but made a recovery. She died in Hove, on 10 October 1985.

== Honours and awards ==
Reynolds was the first woman to be elected Fellow of the Royal Society of Edinburgh in 1949, and received the Lyell Medal from the Geological Society of London in 1960.
