= William Whitaker (geologist) =

English hydrogeologist

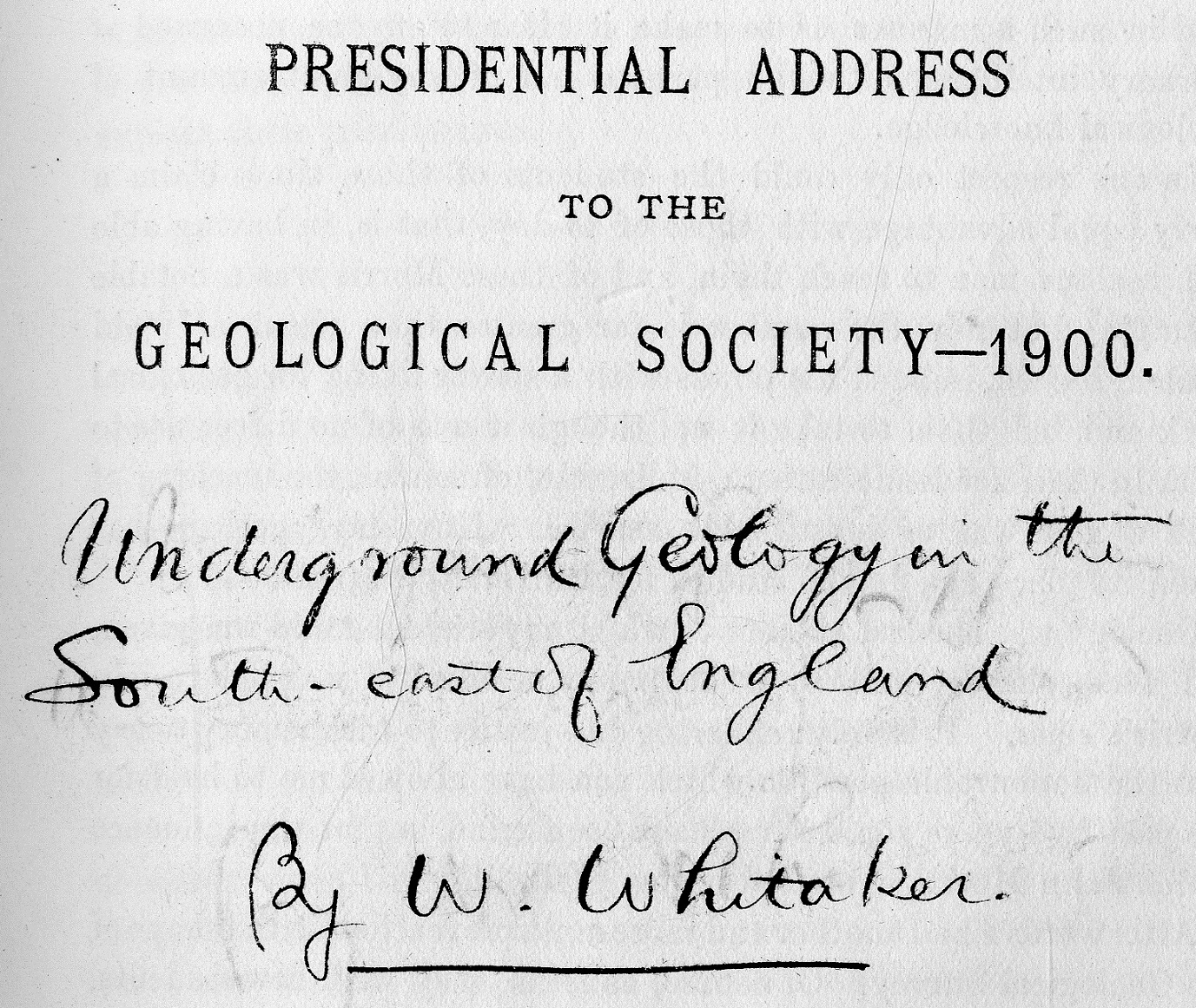
- Born: 4 May 1836; London
- Died: 15 January 1925 (aged 88); Croydon
- Education: University College, London
- Known for: Hydrogeology
- Spouse: Mary Whitaker (Nee Keogh)
- Awards: Murchison Medal (1886); Prestwich Medal (1906); Wollaston Medal (1923)
- Scientific career
- Fields: Geologist

William Whitaker (4 May 1836 in London – 15 January 1925 in Croydon) was a British geologist.

== Early life ==
He was educated at St Albans School and University College, London, where he attained a degree in chemistry in 1855.

== Career ==
He became a geologist, specializing initially in water surveying and mapping. His thorough research, wide knowledge, and his numerous publications, especially his book "The Geology of London and of Part of the Thames Valley" (1889) has led some to call him “the father of English hydrogeology”. He retired in 1896 but continued to work as a water engineer.

... The long lines of escarpment which stretch across several parts of England were formerly considered to be undoubtedly ancient coast-lines; but now we know that they stand up above the general surface merely from resisting air, rain and frost better than the adjoining formations. It has rarely been the good fortune of a geologist to bring conviction to the minds of his fellow-workers on a disputed point by a single memoir; but Mr. Whitaker, of the Geological Survey of England, was so fortunate when, in 1867, he published his paper "On sub-aerial Denudation, and on Cliffs and Escarpments of the Chalk." ....

== Honours ==
He was elected fellow of the Geological Society in 1859, and FRS in 1883. He was president of numerous societies, including both the Geologists’ Association and the Geological Society, and was a recipient of the latter’s Murchison Medal in 1886 and Wollaston Medal in 1923. He died in Croydon, Surrey.
