= Linsdall Richardson =

British geologist

Linsdall Richardson FRSE FGS FLS (24 December 1881 – 1 January 1967) was a 20th-century British geologist and academic author who was awarded the Lyell Medal in 1937.

== Life ==
Linsdall Richardson was born in Burnley in Lancashire on 24 December 1881. He was the son of Rev John Linsdall Richardson (b.1849), then a curate, and his wife, Fanny Sutcliffe of Burnley. The family moved to Holton, Suffolk in 1882 and to Cratfield in Norfolk in 1884.

He was educated at Clifton College, Bristol. He spent most of his life as Director of Cheltenham school of Science and Technology. In 1908 he was elected a Fellow of the Royal Society of Edinburgh. His proposers were Edward William Prevost, Alexander Morison McAldowie, John Walter Gregory and John Horne.

In the First World War he worked on conscription with the Ministry of National Service.

He died on New Years Day, 1 January 1967.

He donated a large number of borehole samples of Quaternary sands and gravels to the Cheltenham Museum.

== Publications ==
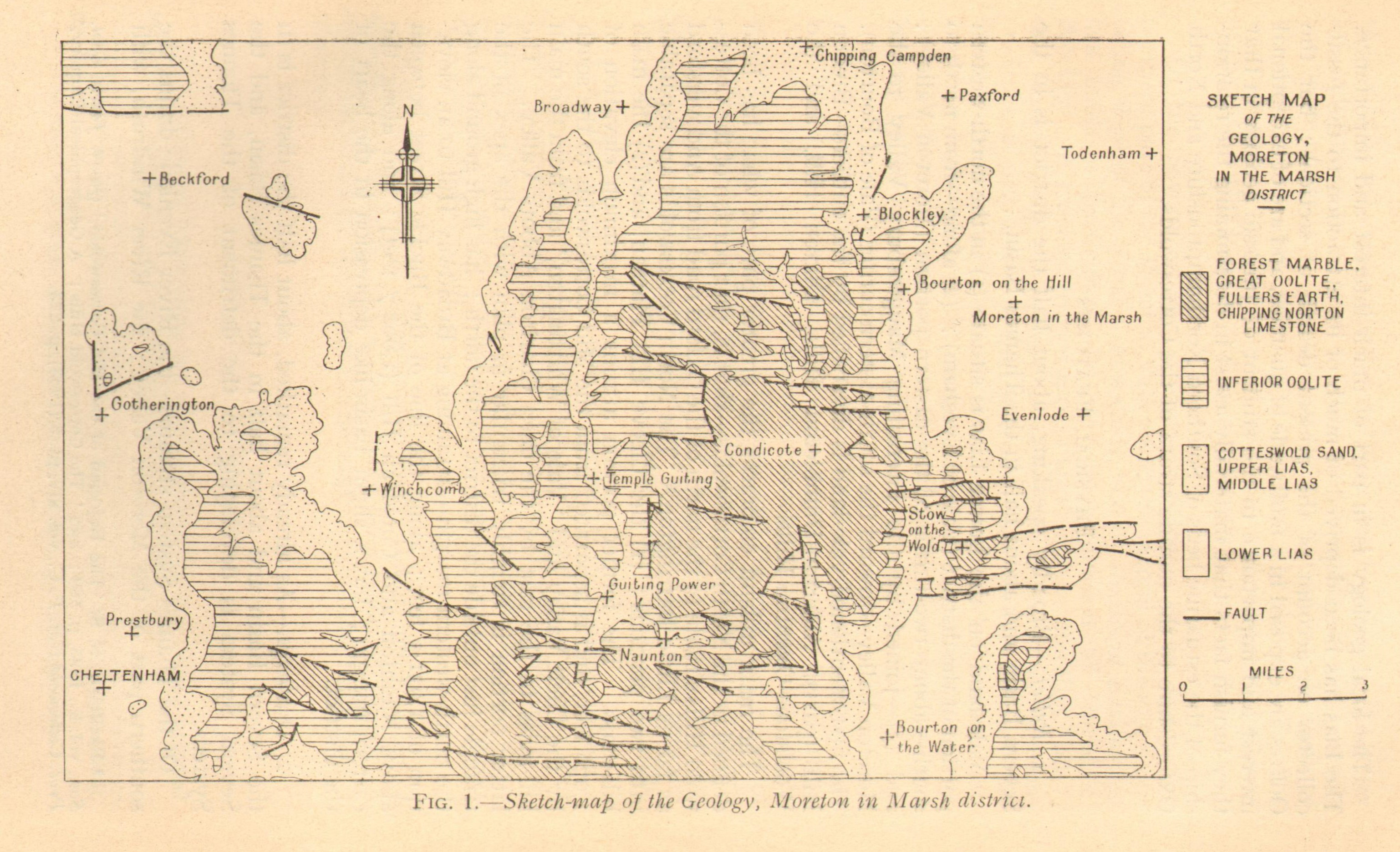
Geological map from The Country around Moreton-in-Marsh

- Wells and Springs of Warwickshire (1928) Full-text at the Internet Archive
- Wells and Springs of Somerset (1928) Full-text at the British Geological Survey
- The Country around Moreton-in-Marsh (1929) Full-text at the Internet Archive
- Wells and Springs in Worcestershire (1930) Full-text at the Internet Archive
- Wells and Springs of Gloucestershire (1930) Full-text at the British Geological Survey
- Wells and Springs in Leicestershire (1931) Full-text at the Internet Archive
- The Country around Cirencester (1933) Full-text at the Internet Archive
- Wells and Springs of Herefordshire (1935) Full-text at the British Geological Survey
- Geology of the Country around Witney (1946) Full-text at the Internet Archive
