= Margaret Collinson =

Paleobotanist

Margaret E. Collinson is a British paleobotanist at Royal Holloway, University of London, United Kingdom.

== Career ==
Her career has led her to leadership of the Plant Paleobiology Research Group at Royal Holloway, University of London, UK. Her research interests are interdisciplinary and wide-ranging within plant Paleobotany as evidenced by her publications. They particularly include consideration of geochemical signatures of oxygen, biomolecules and other elements; the paleoclimate and floral assemblages; pollen and other tissues; and evolution in ancient plants.

She has been president of the International Organization of Paleobotany, a Foreign Member of the Royal Netherlands Academy of Arts and Sciences (2007), and a corresponding Member of the Senckenberg Gesellschaft für Naturforschung (Germany). In 2015 she was awarded Distinguished Fellow of the Botanical Society of America, and in 2026 the Lyell Medal of the Geological Society of London.

== Selected publications ==
She is the author or co-author of over 180 scientific publications. Among her most significant publications are:

- Gordon N. Inglis, Margaret Collinson et al., (2017) Mid-latitude continental temperatures through the early Eocene in western Europe. Earth and Planetary Science Letters. 460, 15 February 2017, 86-96
- Helen M.Talbot, Juliane Bischoff, Gordon N. Inglis, Margaret E. Collinson, Richard D. Pancost (2016) Polyfunctionalised bio- and geohopanoids in the Eocene Cobham Lignite Organic Geochemistry 96, June 2016, 77-92
- Howard J. Falcon-Lang, Viola Mages and Margaret Collinson (2016) The oldest Pinus and its preservation by fire Geology 44 (4), 303–306.
- Margret Steinthorsdottir, Amanda S. Porter, Aidan Holohan, Lutz Kunzmann, Margaret Collinson, and Jennifer C. McElwain (2016) Fossil plant stomata indicate decreasing atmospheric CO_{2} prior to the Eocene–Oligocene boundary Climate of the Past, 12 (2), 439–454
- Michael T. Hren), Nathan D. Sheldon, Stephen T.Grimes, Margaret E. Collinson et al., (2013) Terrestrial cooling in Northern Europe during the Eocene-Oligocene transition. Proceedings of the National Academy of Sciences (USA), 110 (19), 7562-7567
- Sarah A. E. Brown, Andrew C. Scott, Ian J. Glasspool and Margaret E. Collinson (2012) Cretaceous wildfires and their impact on the Earth system. Cretaceous Research 36 162-190
- Stephen G. Compton, Alexander D. Ball, Margaret E. Collinson, Peta Hayes, Alexandr P. Rasnitsyn and Andrew J. Ross (2010) Ancient fig wasps indicate at least 34 Myr of stasis in their mutualism with fig trees. Biology Letters 6, 838–842.
- P. L. Ascough, M. I. Bird, A. C. Scott, M. E. Collinson, I. Cohen-Ofri, C. E. Snape and K. Le Manquais (2010) Charcoal reflectance measurements: implications for structural characterization and assessment of diagenetic alteration. Journal of Archaeological Science .37 (7) 1590-1599
- Selena Y. Smith, Margaret E. Collinson, Paula J. Rudall, David A. Simpson, Federica Marone and Marco Stampanonid (2009) Virtual taphonomy using synchrotron tomographic microscopy reveals cryptic features and internal structure of modern and fossil plants. Proceedings of the National Academy of Sciences (USA), 106 (29) 12013-12018
- Richard D. Pancost, David S. Steart, Luke Handley, Margaret E. Collinson et al., (2007) Increased terrestrial methane cycling at the Palaeocene-Eocene thermal maximum. Nature 449 (7160) 332-
- Neal S. Gupta, Briggs, Derek E. G. Briggs, Margaret E. Collinson et al., (2007) Evidence for the in situ polymerisation of labile aliphatic organic compounds during the preservation of fossil leaves: Implications for organic matter preservation. Organic Geochemistry, 38 (3), 499-522

The standard author abbreviation M.E.Collinson is used to indicate this person as the author when citing a botanical name.
