= John Frederick Blake =

British geologist and clergyman

John Frederick Blake (3 April 1839 – 7 July 1906) was a British geologist and Anglican clergyman.

Blake received B.A. 1862 and M.A. 1865 from Caius College, Cambridge. He was ordained a deacon in 1862 and a priest in 1863. He was curate of Lenton, Nottinghamshire, from 1862 to 1864 and curate of St Mary's, Bryanston Square, London, from 1864 to 1865.

He was Professor of Natural Science at University College, Nottingham, from 1881 to 1888. In 1895 he went to India to arrange the Baroda Museum.

He married in 1866 and was survived by three sons and a daughter.

== Awards and honours ==
- 1891–1893: President of the Geologists' Association
- 1895: Lyell Medal
