= George Highfield Morton =

British geologist

- Born: July 9, 1826; Liverpool
- Died: March 30, 1900 (aged 73)
- Known for: Geology of the country around Liverpool
- Awards: Lyell Medal, 1892

George Highfield Morton (9 July 1826 – 30 March 1900) was a British geologist, best known for his work on the geology of Liverpool and North Wales. He founded the Liverpool Geological Society in 1859, and was awarded the Lyell Medal of the Geological Society of London in 1892.

== Early life and career ==
Morton was born in Liverpool, and educated at the Mechanics’ Institute. He was interested in geology from an early age, and began a collection of fossils as a child. Morton made a living as a house painter and decorator.

In the 1840s and 1850s, Morton visited a number of geological localities in Lancashire, and presented papers on his findings to the Literary and Philosophical Society of Liverpool, the British Association and the Geological Society of London. In 1863, Morton published a book on the Geology of the Country around Liverpool, based on a lecture he had given to the Liverpool naturalists' field club in November 1861.

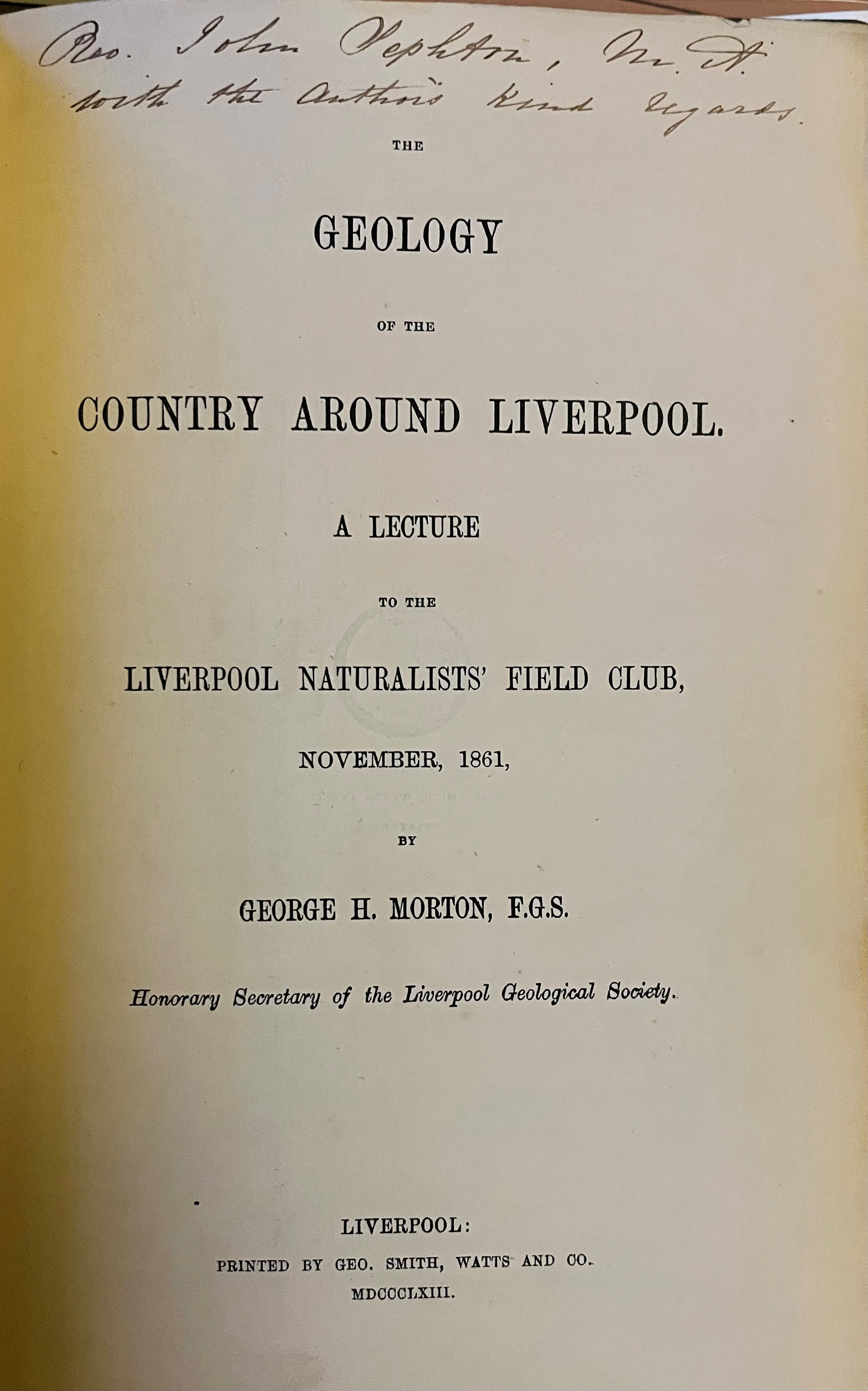
Frontispiece of 'Geology of the Country around Liverpool' by Morton, published in 1863. The dedication is to Rev. John Sephton M.A., who was later headmaster of Liverpool Institute.

In 1864, Morton was appointed as a lecturer in geology at Queen’s College, Liverpool. Morton published a second edition of his book in 1891, and in 1897 published an appendix and a geological map of the district.

== Discoveries and recognition ==
In his 1863 book, Morton described and named a fossil footprint, Cheirotherium storetonense from Triassic sandstones in a quarry near the village of Storeton. Morton surmised that the five-toed prints were made by a reptile.

In 1859, Morton founded the Liverpool Geological Society. He was elected a Fellow of the Geological Society of London in 1858, and was awarded the Lyell Medal in 1892 for his long service to geology.
