= Paul Tapponnier =

French geologist (1947–2023)

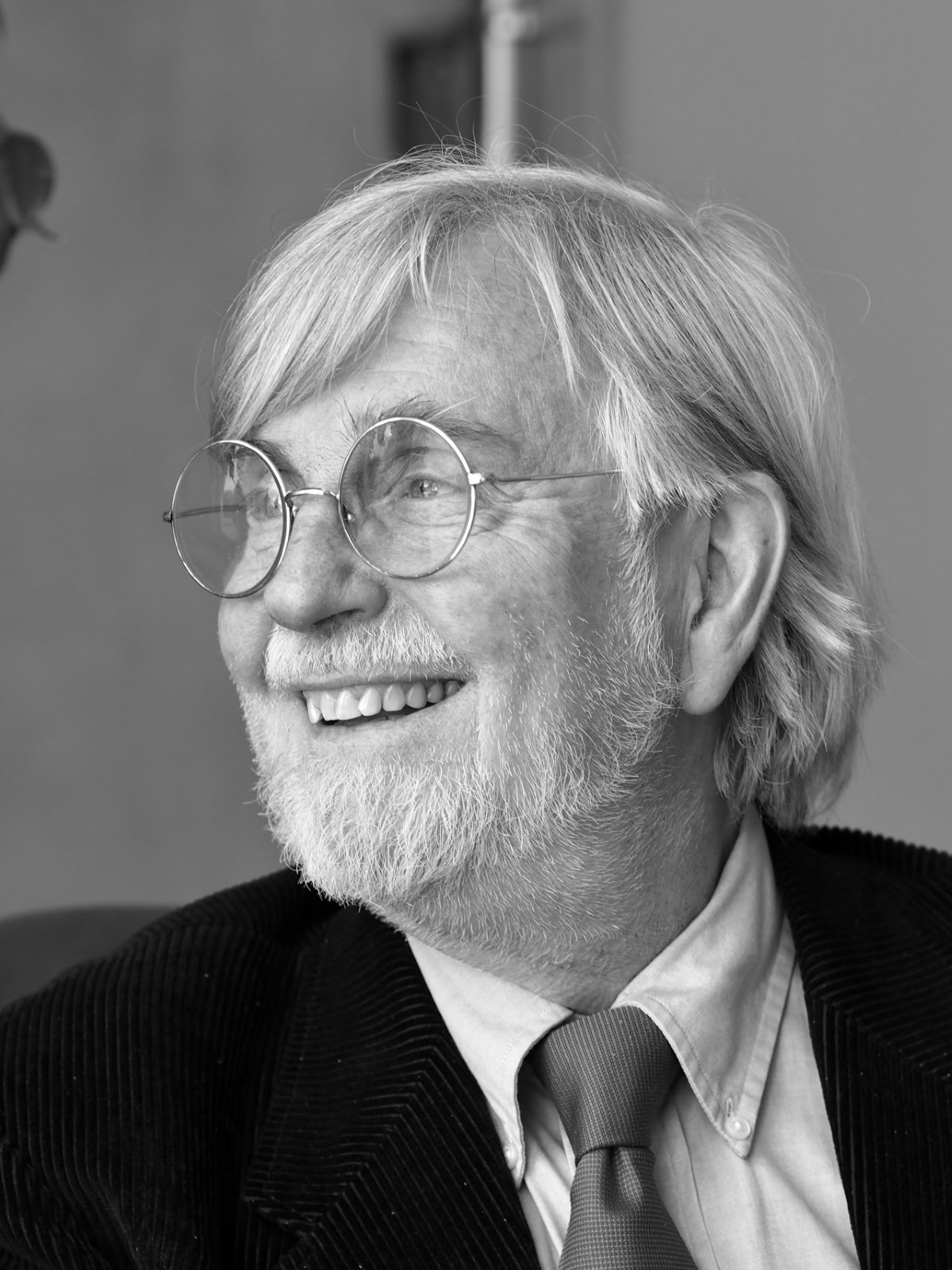
- Born: 6 January 1947; Annecy, France
- Died: 24 December 2023 (aged 76); Beijing, China
- Education: École des Mines de Paris; Massachusetts Institute of Technology; University of Montpellier
- Occupation: Geologist

Paul Tapponnier (6 January 1947 – 24 December 2023) was a French geologist, specializing in plate tectonics and crustal deformation.

== Life and career ==
Tapponnier graduated in 1970 with a MS in geology from the École Nationale Supérieure des Mines de Paris. From 1972 to 1975, he was a research fellow at the Massachusetts Institute of Technology (MIT). He received in 1978 his doctorate from the Université Montpellier-II. He was an associate professor from 1980 to 1985, a full professor from 1986 to 1990, and a full professor with tenure from 1991 to 2009 (and simultaneously, the director of the tectonics department) at the Institut de Physique du Globe de Paris. In 1985 he was a visiting scientist at the Jet Propulsion Laboratory. From January to July 2000, he was a visiting professor at Caltech. Since 2009 he has been a tectonics group leader at the EOS (Earth Observatory of Singapore) of Nanyang Technological University.

Tapponnier was a pioneer in the 1970s in the use of satellite imagery for the study of plate tectonics. Much of his research, often in collaboration in the late 1970s with Peter Molnar, deals with Asian tectonics involving the collision of the Indian Plate with the Eurasian Plate.

Tapponnier headed several oceanographic research cruises and many field projects in various countries. His research interests included:

1. Continental Dynamics and Tectonics, with particular emphasis on collision zones, plateaux and mountain belts, particularly in Asian-Mediterranean regions.
2. Active faulting and seismotectonics, earthquake hazard assessment.
3. Quantitative Geomorphology, state-of-the-art determination of current rates of active deformation processes.
4. Rock mechanics and rock deformation physics.

Tapponnier died on 24 December 2023 in Beijing, at the age of 76.

== Awards and honors ==
- 1984 — Silver Medal of CNRS
- 1985 — Alfred Wegener Medal
- 1990 — Grand prix scientifique de la ville de Paris
- 1994 — Fellow of the American Geophysical Union
- 1996 — Knight of the Legion of Honour
- 2001 — Lyell Medal
- 2005 — Member of the French Academy of Sciences (section Sciences de l'univers).
- 2005 — Foreign associate member of the National Academy of Sciences

== Selected publications ==
=== Articles ===
- with P. Molnar: Molnar, Peter; Tapponnier, Paul (1975). "Cenozoic tectonics of Asia: Effect of a continental collision". Science. 189 (4201): 419–425. Bibcode:1975Sci...189..419M. doi:10.1126/science.189.4201.419. JSTOR 1740465. PMID 17781869.
- with P. Molnar: Tapponnier, Paul; Molnar, Peter (1976). "Slip-line field theory and large-scale continental tectonics". Nature. 264 (5584): 319–324. Bibcode:1976Natur.264..319T. doi:10.1038/264319a0. S2CID 4280547.
- with P. Molnar: Molnar, Peter; Tapponnier, Paul (1977). "The collision between India and Eurasia". Scientific American. 236 (4): 30–41. Bibcode:1977SciAm.236d..30M. doi:10.1038/scientificamerican0477-30. JSTOR 24953979.
- with P. Molnar: Molnar, Peter; Tapponnier, Paul (1978). "Active faulting in Tibet". Journal of Geophysical Research: Solid Earth. 83: 5361–5375. doi:10.1029/JB083iB11p05361.
- with P. Molnar: Tapponnier, Paul; Molnar, Peter (1979). "Active faulting and Cenozoic tectonics of the Tien Shan, Mongolia and Baykal regions". Journal of Geophysical Research. 84 (B7): 3425–3459. Bibcode:1979JGR....84.3425T. doi:10.1029/JB084iB07p03425.
- with P. Molnar: Molnar, Peter; Tapponnier, Paul (1981). "A possible dependence of tectonic strength on the age of the crust in Asia". Earth and Planetary Science Letters. 52 (1): 107–114. Bibcode:1981E&PSL..52..107M. doi:10.1016/0012-821X(81)90213-2.
- with G. Peltzer, A. Y. Le Dain, R. Armijo, and P. Cobbold: Tapponnier, P.; Peltzer, G.; Le Dain, A. Y.; Armijo, R.; Cobbold, P. (1982). "Propagating extrusion tectonics in Asia: New insights from simple experiments with plasticine". Geology. 10 (12): 611–616. Bibcode:1982Geo....10..611T. doi:10.1130/0091-7613(1982)10<611:PETIAN>2.0.CO;2.
- with Jean‐Philippe Avouac: Avouac, Jean-Philippe; Tapponnier, Paul (1993). "Kinematic model of active deformation in central Asia" (PDF). Geophysical Research Letters. 20 (10): 895–898. Bibcode:1993GeoRL..20..895A. doi:10.1029/93GL00128.
- with V. Courtillot, C. Jaupart, I. Manighetti, and J. Besse: Courtillot, V.; Jaupart, C.; Manighetti, I.; Tapponnier, P.; Besse, J. (1999). "On causal links between flood basalts and continental breakup". Earth and Planetary Science Letters. 166 (3–4): 177–195. Bibcode:1999E&PSL.166..177C. doi:10.1016/S0012-821X(98)00282-9.
- with Xu Zhiqin, Françoise Roger, Bertrand Meyer, Nicolas Arnaud, Gérard Wittlinger, and Yang Jingsui: Tapponnier, P.; Zhiqin, X.; Roger, F.; Meyer, B.; Arnaud, N.; Wittlinger, G.; Jingsui, Y. (2001). "Oblique stepwise rise and growth of the Tibet Plateau". Science. 294 (5547): 1671–1677. Bibcode:2001Sci...294.1671T. doi:10.1126/science.105978. PMID 11721044. S2CID 24563782.

=== Books ===
- with Kevin Kling: Montagnes. Les grandes œuvres de la terre. Paris: La Martinière. 2006.
  - Mountains : masterworks of the living earth. New York: Abrams. 2006.
