= John Morris (geologist) =

British geologist and paleontologist (1810–1886)

John Morris (19 February 1810 – 7 January 1886) was an English geologist.

== Life ==
John Morris was born in 1810 at Homerton, London, and educated at private schools.

He was engaged for some years as a pharmaceutical chemist in High Street Kensington, but soon became interested in geology and other branches of science, and ultimately retired from business. His published papers speedily attracted notice, and his Catalogue of British Fossils, published in 1843, a work involving much critical research was an important pioneering effort in palaeontology, added greatly to his reputation.

Perhaps more importantly, he helped launch the illustrated monographs of the Palaeontographical Society. He also helped identify fossils for Charles Darwin from his HMS Beagle voyages, and he may even have tutored Karl Marx, who had a hobby interest in geology. Morris was elected F.G.S. in 1845.

In 1853 Morris went on a geological tour of Germany with Sir Roderick Impey Murchison, and was persuaded by Murchison to apply for the joint Chair of Geology and Mineralogy at University College, London, that had been vacant since 1851. Morris put himself forward and was duly appointed as the first Goldsmid Professor of Geology (endowed from a bequest of £1000 by Baron de Goldsmid), taking up appointment in January 1853, succeeding Andrew Crombie Ramsay, who had resigned in 1851. Morris remained in post until his retirement in 1877.

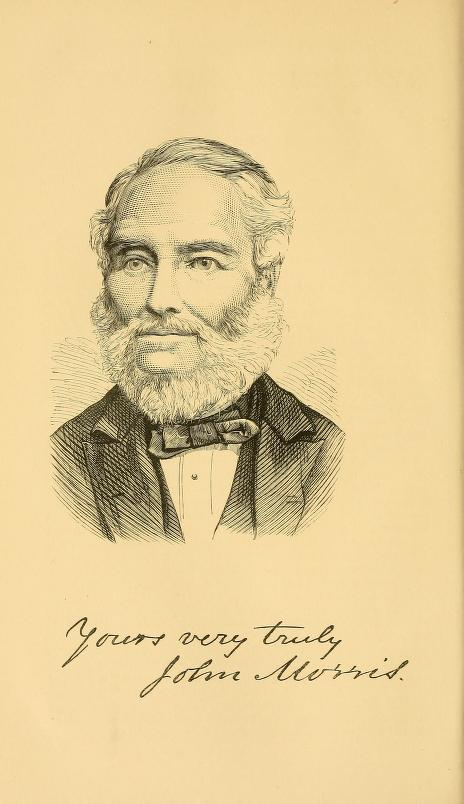
Portrait from 'The Geological Magazine, or, Monthly Journal of Geology' (1878): artist unknown

He expanded the Museum of Geology at UCL through donations from Murchison and George Bellas Greenough and adding great numbers of fossils from his own collection. He established a regular course of lectures in mineralogy and geology and introduced field-classes: "During the course demonstrations in the field will be given, with a view to affording the Students a practical acquaintance of the method of Geological surveying, and of describing the sections presented by quarries, road-cuttings &c." Although modest and somewhat diffident Morris was a gifted teacher, who was given to explaining ideas clearly and logically with lucid exposition. Numbers attending geology courses at UCL increased significantly under Morris.

Along with Bowerbank and five others, he was a founding member of the London Clay Club. Morris was president of the Geologists' Association from 1868 to 1871 and from 1877 to 1879. He was awarded the Lyell Medal of the Geological Society of London in 1876. In 1878, Morris was awarded an honorary M.A. degree by the University of Cambridge.

Morris's best original work was done on Eocene and Jurassic rocks. He died on 7 January 1886, and was buried at Kensal Green. One daughter survived him.
