= Peter Clift =

British marine geologist and geophysicist

Peter Dominic Clift
- Born: 1966 (age 59–60); Ware, Hertfordshire, United Kingdom
- Education: University of Oxford, University of Edinburgh
- Awards: Lyell Medal (2023); Fellow, American Geophysical Union (2024)
- Scientific career
- Fields: Earth sciences, geophysics, oceanography
- Workplaces: University of Aberdeen; University of Bremen; Massachusetts Institute of Technology; Chinese Academy of Sciences; Louisiana State University; University College, London; University of Szczecin

Peter Clift is a British marine geologist and geophysicist specializing in the geology of Asia and the western Pacific. He was Charles T. McCord Professor of Petroleum Geology at Louisiana State University from 2012 to 2023, and a Royal Society-Wolfson Fellow at University College, London from 2023. Clift was awarded the Lyell Medal of the Geological Society of London in 2023, and was elected a Union Fellow of the American Geophysical Union in 2024.

== Scientific Research ==
Clift is a geologist who applies marine geophysical, geochemical and classical geological methods to understand the history of geological basins over the last 50 million years. In particular, he works on understanding the relationships between mountain building in the Himalaya and Tibet Plateau and the intensification of the Asian monsoon. Clift has worked on evolution the Indus River, which he dated to being older than 45 million years. He has proposed that the Indus captured the four major rivers of the Punjab region into its basin after around 5 million years ago. Prior to this time the Chenab, Ravi, Sutlej and Jellum Rivers would have flowed eastwards into the Ganges River, not westwards into the Indus. A project funded by the Leverhulme Trust allowed his to show that the reorganisation of rivers in SW Asia greatly predated the collapse of the Indus Valley civilization. He showed that a river, possibly the mythical Sarasvati River used to flow from the region of Chandigarh in Punjab (India) but ceased to flow after 4500 years ago, possibly due to weakening of the monsoon.

Clift has also used the sediment records of the South China Sea to propose a start to the monsoon after 24 million years ago, compared to the more popular 8 million year age. He is involved with efforts to have the Integrated Ocean Drilling Program collect samples in the Asian marginal seas for monsoon studies. Clift also works with the tectonics and nature of mass recycling in subduction zones. Prior to Louisiana he was Kilgour Professor of Geology at the University of Aberdeen from 2004 to 2012. Clift worked for the Woods Hole Oceanographic Institution as a research scientist (1995–2004), was a staff scientist with the Ocean Drilling Program at Texas A&M University (1993–1995) and was a research fellow at the University of Edinburgh (1990–1993) sponsored by BP and the Royal Society of Edinburgh. Since 2024, he has been employed by the University of Szczecin.

== Education ==
Clift took his bachelor's degree at the University of Oxford, where he was a student at Worcester College. He completed his Ph.D. on the geology of southern Greece in 1990 at University of Edinburgh. In 2014 he was awarded a Doctor of Science by the University of Oxford.

== Personal life ==
Peter Clift grew up in Ware, Hertfordshire where he attended St. Edmund's College. His father, Donald W. Clift, also a native of Ware, worked for BP, including in Beijing, China for five years. His mother Margaret T. Clift (née Feighan) is from Cullyhanna, Northern Ireland.

== Awards ==
- 2024, Union Fellow of the American Geophysical Union.
- 2023, Lyell Medal of the Geological Society of London
- 2009, Fellow at the Hanse Wissenschaftskolleg in Delmenhorst, Lower Saxony, Germany.
- 2008, Elected a Fellow of the Geological Society of America.
- 2005, Appointed as visiting professor, Chinese Academy of Sciences, Guangzhou.
- 2005, Murchison Fund, Geological Society of London, UK
- 2005–2007, Humboldt Foundation Fellow, University of Bremen, Germany
- 2004, Visiting lecturer, University of Tokyo, Japan
- 2003, Visiting lecturer, National Central University and Academia Sinica, Taiwan
- 2001, Swiney Trust invited visiting lecturer, University of Edinburgh, UK

== Major recent publications ==
He has published numerous scientific papers over the course of his career.

Among his most cited papers are:

- Clift, P.D. and Vannucchi, P., 2004. Controls on tectonic accretion versus erosion in subduction zones: Implications for the origin and recycling of the continental crust. Reviews of Geophysics, 42, RG2001, doi:10.1029/2003RG000127.
- Robertson AHF, Clift PD, Degnan PJ, et al., "Paleogeographic And Paleotectonic Evolution Of The Eastern Mediterranean Neotethys"
- Palaeogeography, Palaeoclimatology, Palaeoecology 87 (1-4): 289-343 October 1991, doi:10.1016/0031-0182(91)90140-M.
- Larsen HC, Saunders AD, Clift PD, et al., "Seven Million Years Of Glaciation In Greenland" Science 264 (5161): 952-955 13 May 1994, doi:10.1126/science.264.5161.952.
- Clift, P.D. and Blusztajn, J., 2005. Reorganization of the western Himalayan river system after five million years ago. Nature, 438, 1001–1003, doi:10.1038/nature04379.
