= David Williams (geologist, born 1898) =

British geologist

- Born: 12 October 1898; Liverpool, England
- Died: 1984 (aged 85–86)
- Education: Liverpool University
- Scientific career
- Workplaces: Imperial College London

David Williams (1898 – 8 May 1984) was a noted British geologist.

Williams was born of Welsh parents in Liverpool, England. After studying civil engineering at the University of Liverpool, he became interested in geology after his twin brother Howel began to study geology. David Williams studied under Percy Boswell at the University of Liverpool. There David Williams received his Ph.D. for research on paleozoic volcanic rock in Snowdonia.

Later he worked in geophysical prospecting in Southern Africa and for Rio Tinto in Spain, before coming to Imperial as a lecturer in 1932. On the retirement of W. R. Jones in 1947 he became Professor of Mining Geology.

He was the Head of the Department of Geology at Imperial College London from 1950 to 1964; his predecessor as Head was H. H. Read and his successor was John Sutton.

David Williams was awarded the Lyell Medal in 1959.

== Selected publications ==
- Williams, D. (1930). "The geology of the country between Nant Peris and Nant Ffrancon, Snowdonia". Quarterly Journal of the Geological Society. 86 (1–4): 191–233. doi:10.1144/GSL.JGS.1930.086.01-04.10. S2CID 140581403.
- Williams, David (1959). "Mineral exploration". Proceedings of the Geologists' Association. 70 (2): 125–157. Bibcode:1959PrGA...70..125W. doi:10.1016/S0016-7878(59)80001-8. S2CID 209491506.
- Williams, David (1960). "Genesis of sulphide ores". Proceedings of the Geologists' Association. 71 (3): 245–284. Bibcode:1960PrGA...71..245W. doi:10.1016/S0016-7878(60)80011-9.
