= Edwin Tulley Newton =

British paleontologist (1840-1930)

Edwin Tulley Newton FRS FGS FZS (4 May 1840 – 28 January 1930) was a British paleontologist.

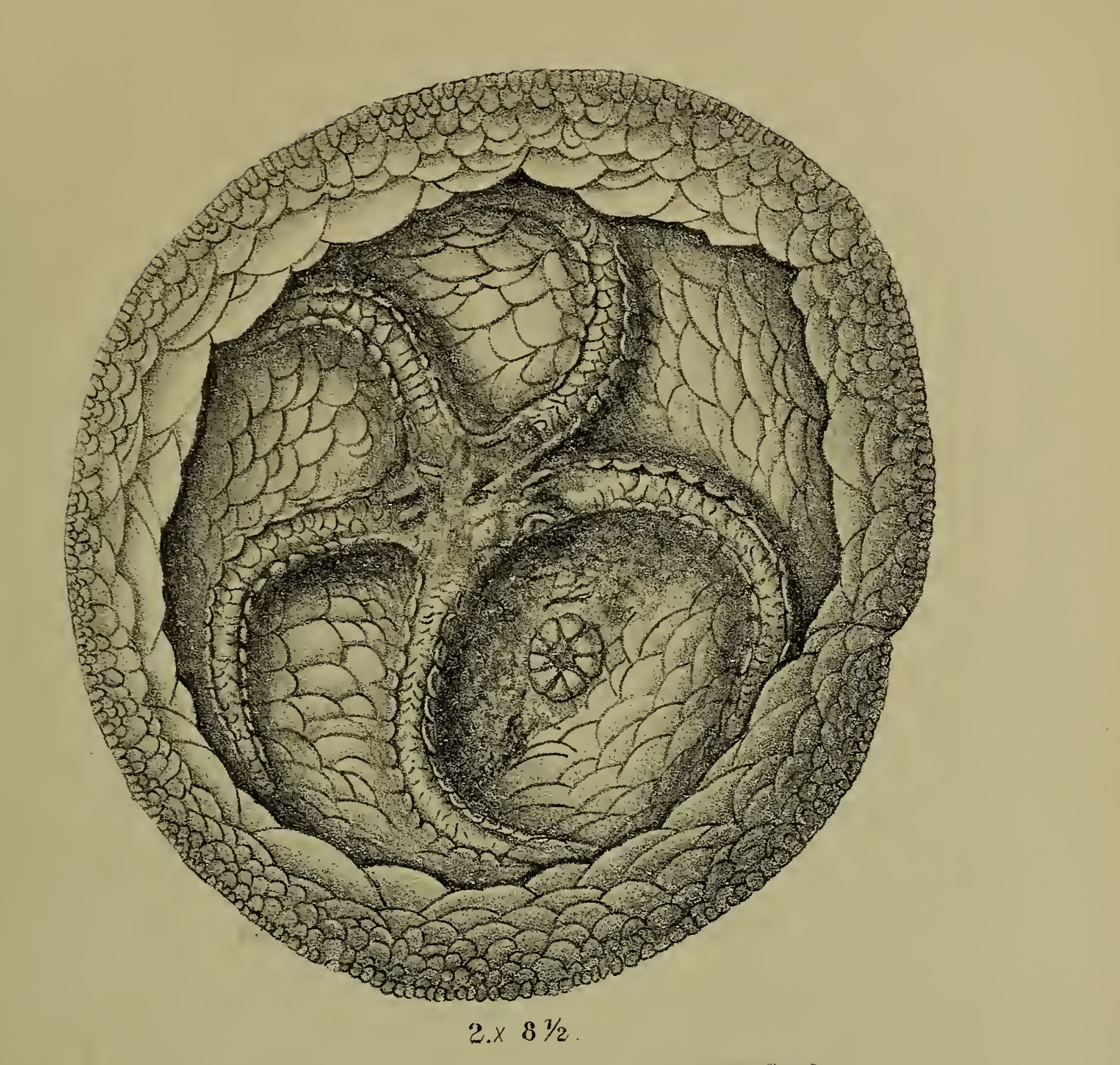
Lepidodiscus milleri, a fossil echinoderm

Newton originally worked at handicrafts, but was able to attend Thomas Henry Huxley's lectures and by 1865, was appointed as his assistant. In 1882, he became a paleontologist to the "Geologic Survey", a position he retained until 1905. His early work included microscopic sectioning of coal and notable studies on cockroach brains.

Later, he did work on chimaeroid fish fossils. In 1893, Newton won the Lyell Medal. He was the president of the Geologists' Association in 1896–1898 and the president of the Palaeontographical Society from 1921 to 1928. Newton was elected Fellow of the Geological Society in 1873, Zoological Society of London in 1885, and Fellow of the Royal Society in 1893.
