= John Frederick Norman Green =

John Frederick Norman Green (26 June 1873 – 11 December 1949) was an English geologist who won the prestigious Lyell Medal in 1925 and served as president of the Geological Society of London between 1934 and 1936.

He was born in Stibbard, Norfolk, England, the son of Rev. William Frederick Green and Florence Agnes (Coles) Green. of East Budleigh, Devon. He was educated at Bradfield College and Emmanuel College, Cambridge. He died in Bournemouth in 1949.

== Published works ==
- The older Palæozoic Succession of the Duddon Estuary (London, 1913)
- Note on the Correlation of the Ingleton Slates (London, 1917)
- The Vulcanicity of the Lake District (London, 1919)
- The Geological Structure of the Lake District (London, 1920)

=== Journal articles ===
- "The terraces of southernmost England", Proceedings of the Q. J. Geological Society of London, 92 (1936)
- "The age of the raised beaches of south Britain", Proceedings of the Geological Association, 54 (1943)
- "The terraces of Bournemouth, Hants", Proceedings of the Geological Association, 57 (1946)
- "Some gravels and gravel-pits in Hampshire and Dorset", Proceedings of the Geological Association, 58 (1947)
- "The breccia of Redcliff, Wareham", Proceedings of the Bournemouth Natural Science Society, 3 (1949)
