= A. Morley Davies =

British palaeontologist (1869–1959)

Arthur Morley Davies (1869–1959) was a British palaeontologist and author or co-author of a number of books on the subject. He was an Honorary Fellow of the Royal Geographical Society, and Reader in Palaeontology at the Imperial College of Science and Technology, University of London. He was awarded the Lyell Medal in 1929.

Davies was a critic of creationism. His book Evolution: And Its Modern Critics was a reply to the arguments of creationists such as Douglas Dewar.

== Publications ==
- Buckinghamshire: With Maps, Diagrams and Illustrations (1912)
- A Geography of the British Isles (1929)
- Tertiary Faunas: A Text-book for Oilfield Palaeontologists and Students of Geology (1934)
- Evolution: And Its Modern Critics (1937)
