= Herbert Leader Hawkins =

British geologist

Herbert Leader Hawkins FRS (1887 – 29 December 1968) was a British geologist. Awarded the Lyell Medal in 1940.

In the First World War he was a conscientious objector, exempted from military service conditional upon continuing his then work.

Hawkins spent his entire academic career at the University of Reading, after first being appointed Acting Part Time Lecturer in Geology in 1909. He was appointed Professor of Geology in 1920, and oversaw the expansion of the department over the next few decades. Among those staff he appointed was Lawrence Wager, in 1929. It was from Reading that Wager completed his work on both Greenland and Everest for which he was later celebrated. In 1937, Hawkins was elected Fellow of the Royal Society, for his distinguished work on the Echinoidea (sea urchins), and his textbook on 'Invertebrate Palaeontology' (Methuen, 1920) which was 'much esteemed and illustrates his broad and philosophical outlook'. His nomination notes that 'He would have published more if not engaged in building up a new Department, from two students in 1920 to 61 in 1932'.

In his biographical notes, Percival Allen notes that Hawkins was 'Loved by many [but] known to few'; and that while by the early 1920's Hawkins was 'poised for a major work on the whole Echinoidea, fossil and living' it was not to be, and 'many influences conspired to thwart him'.
