= Jake Hancock =

John Michael "Jake" Hancock
- Born: 10 August 1928; Salisbury, United Kingdom
- Died: 4 March 2004 (aged 75); Shaftesbury, United Kingdom
- Education: University of Cambridge
- Known for: Geology of the Cretaceous, appreciation of Wine
- Awards: 1989 Lyell Medal of the Geological Society of London
- Scientific career
- Fields: Sedimentology and Stratigraphy
- Workplaces: Imperial College, London
- Doctoral advisor: Maurice Black

John Michael Hancock (10 August 1928 – 4 March 2004), known professionally as Jake, was a geologist with particular interests in chalk and the Cretaceous Period.

== Biography ==
Hancock was born on 10 August 1928 in Salisbury, Wiltshire, educated at Dauntsey's School near Devizes and was a national serviceman in the Royal Air Force between 1947 and 1949, before going to Queens' College, Cambridge, to read geology and petrology as an undergraduate.

He graduated in 1952 and stayed on to work for his doctorate under the supervision of Maurice Black. His thesis was entitled The marginal facies of the British Chalk and in 1955 he joined the junior academic staff at King's College, London. He became Senior Lecturer in 1970 and Reader in 1977.

In 1986 he moved to Imperial College London where he was awarded the 1989 Lyell Medal of the Geological Society of London and retired in 1993 to Shaftesbury but continued to teach at Imperial as Emeritus Professor.

He was also an erudite teacher, bringing all aspects of science and general life to bear on his subject; one of his more generalist themes for the undergraduate geologist, being "How can the study of gardening benefit the geologist?". He also had a long time commitment to the Working Men's College in North London.

His contributions included over 110 scientific papers in English and French and a pursuit of the study of the relationship between geology and viniculture.

He died of cancer on 4 March 2004. He was the subject of a memorial volume of the Proceedings of the Geologists' Association in 2006 (Vol 117, Part 2), on which some of this article is based.
