= Edmund Johnston Garwood =

British geologist (1864–1949)

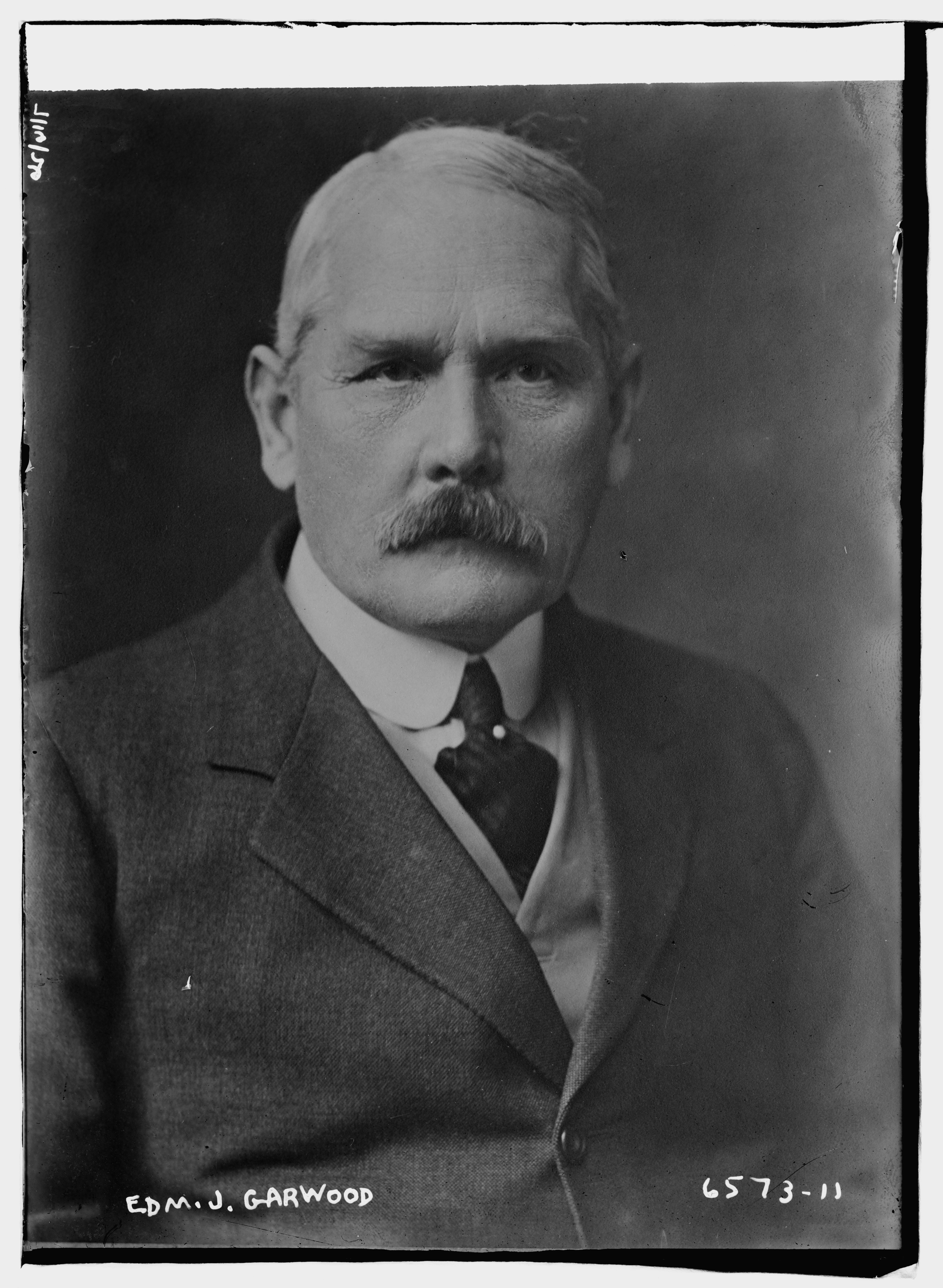
Edmund J. Garwood

Edmund Johnston Garwood (18 May 1864 in Bridlington, East Riding of Yorkshire – 12 June 1949 in London) was a British geologist and President of the Geological Society of London from 1930 to 1932.

== Biography ==
Garwood was born in Bridlington and educated at Eton and Trinity College, Cambridge, where he matriculated in 1886. In 1899 he accompanied D.W. Freshfield on an expedition to Kanchenjunga and wrote an account of the local geology.

In 1901, Garwood was appointed Yates-Goldsmid Professor of Geology and Mineralogy at London University, a position he held until his retirement in 1931.

In 1913–14, Garwood was elected as the President of the Geographical Association.

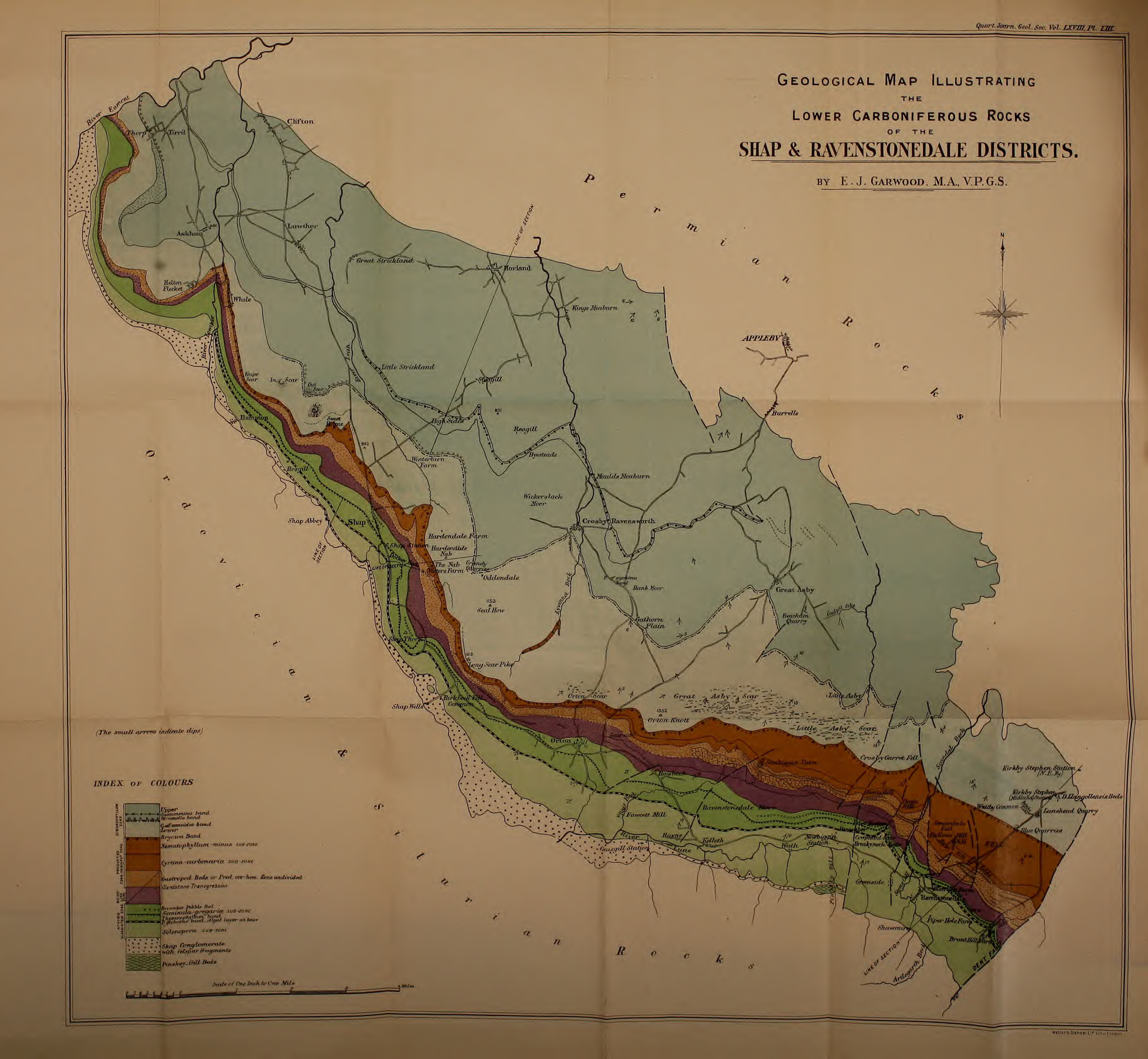
Geological Map of Shap and Ravenstonedale. From Garwood (1912)

He was elected a Fellow of the Royal Society in May 1914. His candidature citation read:

Yates-Goldsmild Professor of Geology and Mineralogy in the University of London. Author of: - 'Origin of the Concretions in the Magnesian Limestone' (Geol Mag, 1891); 'The Geology of Northumberland – County History of Northumberland' (vols i-vi); 'Contributions to the Glacial Geology of Spitzbergen' (with Dr J W Gregory, Quart Journ Geol Soc, vol liv); 'Addition Notes on the Glacial Phenomena of Spitzbergen' (ibid, vol lv); 'Notes on a Map of the Glacier of Kargchenjunga' (Geogr Journ, 1902); 'Hanging Valleys in the Alps and Himalayas' (Quart Journ Geol Soc, vol lviii); 'The Geological Structure and Physical Features of Sikkim' (Appendix to 'Round Kangchenjunga', by D W Freshfield, 1903); 'The Tarns of the Canton Ticino' (Quart Journ Geol Soc, vol lxii); 'The Faunal Succession in the Carboniferous Limestone of Westmorland' (Geol Mag, 1907); 'The Geology of Tynemouth Parish – County History of Northumberland' (vol viii); 'Note on a new Sounding Machine for use on Lakes and Rivers without a Boat' (Proc Roy Soc, A, vol lxxxi, 1908); The Geology of Northlumberland and Durham' (Jubilee volume of Geol Assoc, Part iv); 'The Lower Carboniferous Succession in the North-West of England' (Quart Journ Geol Soc, lxviii).

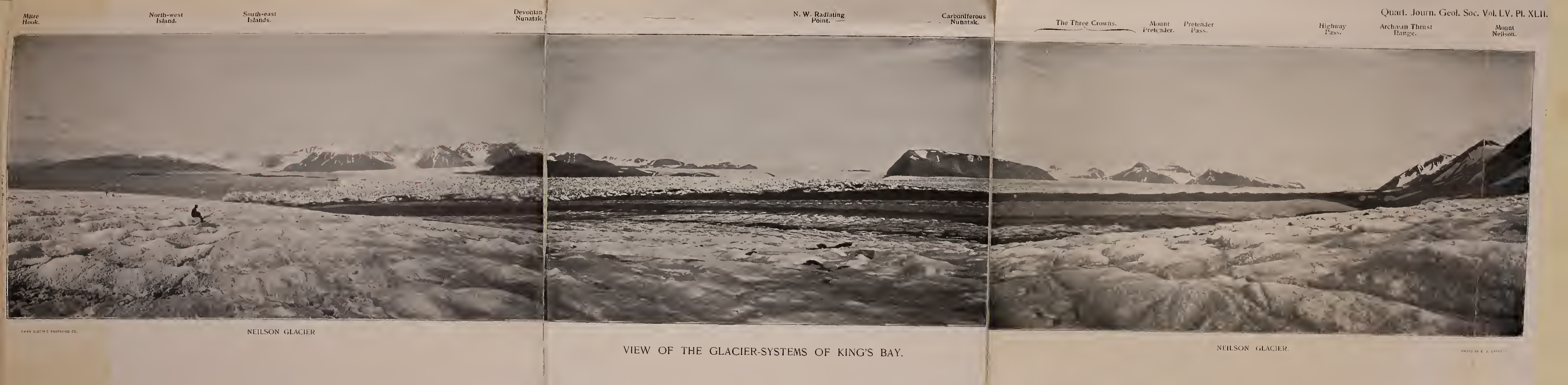

The glacier systems of King's Bay Spitsbergen. From Garwood (1899)
