= Charles Alexander McMahon =

Anglo-Irish soldier, geologist, and administrator in British India

Lieutenant-General Charles Alexander McMahon FRS FGS (23 March 1830 – 21 February 1904) was an Anglo-Irish soldier, geologist, and administrator in British India.

== Early life and family ==
Born at Highgate, McMahon was the son of Captain Alexander McMahon (born 1791), an officer of the East India Company, originally of Kilrea, County Londonderry, by his wife Aim, a daughter of Major Patrick Mansell, a British army officer. His grandfather, Arthur McMahon, was a Presbyterian minister at Kilrea and a prominent Irish Republican, a leading member of the Society of United Irishmen and one of their colonels during the Irish Rebellion of 1798. He fought at Saintfield and Ballynahinch and fled to France, where he served in Napoleon’s Irish Legion and died fighting on the French side at Waterloo.

In 1881, McMahon’s father was an elderly inmate of the Royal India Asylum at Hanwell.

== Career ==
After training at the Addiscombe Military Seminary, McMahon was commissioned into the Madras Army and served for eight years in the 39th Regiment, Madras Native Infantry, and for thirty years was a member of the Punjab Commission. He was appointed as Commissioner of Lahore and Hissar in the Punjab Province.

While at Hissar in 1871, McMahon began to work on geology, and in 1877 published his first important paper, in Volume X of the Records of the Geological Survey of India, dealing with a group of crystalline rocks. In 1879, while on leave in England, with the rank of lieutenant-colonel, he enrolled as a student at the Royal School of Mines. Back in India he continued to investigate its geology, contributing twenty-one papers to the Records.

In 1885 he retired with the rank of colonel, but received further promotions, to major-general in 1888 and to Lieutenant-General in 1892. Settling in London, he took up petrology, publishing papers which took the total number of his contributions to geology to nearly fifty.

He was president of the Geologists' Association from 1894 to 1896. In 1899 he was awarded the Lyell Medal by the Geological Society of London.

McMahon died in February 1904, aged 73, and an obituary in the Geological Magazine described him as an excellent geologist and petrologist and a prominent member of the Geological Society of London, noting that he had had no early scientific training.

He was the father of Henry McMahon (born 1862), who followed his father into a career in India.

== Honours ==
McMahon was elected as a Fellow of the Royal Society of London for Improving Natural Knowledge, a Fellow of the Geological Society of London, and a Fellow of the University of Lahore.
