= Geologists' Association =

British geological organisation

- Formation: 17 December 1858; 167 years ago
- Founded at: London, United Kingdom
- Type: Professional association
- Registration no.: 233199
- Headquarters: Burlington House, Piccadilly; London, W1
- Members: >1,200 (2023)
- President: Dr Liam Gallagher
- Executive Secretary: Sarah Stafford

The Geologists' Association, founded in 1858, is a British organisation with charitable status for those concerned with the study of geology. It publishes the Proceedings of the Geologists' Association and jointly with the Geological Society of London, Geology Today.

== See also ==
- List of geoscience organizations
- List of presidents of the Geologists' Association
