= List of professorships at the University of Cambridge =

This is a list of professorships at the University of Cambridge.

During the early history of the University of Cambridge, the title professor simply denoted a doctor who taught in the university, a usage that continues to be found in, for example, US universities. However, from the 16th century onwards in Cambridge it was used to denote those holding "chairs" that had been founded by the university in a particular subject or endowed by a benefaction.

The university historically has made no formal distinction between established (or statutory) chairs and personal (or titular) chairs: all professorships are university offices formally established by a vote, and listed together as one class in the statutes. In practice, professorships can be established for a limited period of time or for a single tenure only, expiring after the first incumbent vacates office. It is common for permanent professorships to have originally been established for a single tenure, before being made permanent at a later date. This article only lists professorships which have had more than one incumbent, or which are not limited in duration.

The Regius Professorships are "royal" professorships, being created by the reigning monarch. The first five Regius Professorships, sometimes referred to as the Henrician Regius Professors, were granted arms and crests in 1590.

== Notable professorships at the University of Cambridge ==
Professorship	Faculty or Department	Benefactor	From	To	Notes
Lady Margaret's Professor of Divinity	Divinity	Lady Margaret Beaufort	1502		
Regius Professor of Divinity	Divinity	Henry VIII	1540		
Regius Professor of Civil Law	Law	Henry VIII	1540		
Regius Professor of Physic	Medicine	Henry VIII	1540		Ex officio Head of the School of Clinical Medicine
Regius Professor of Hebrew	Middle Eastern Studies	Henry VIII	1540		
Regius Professor of Greek	Classics	Henry VIII	1540		
Sir Thomas Adams's Professor of Arabic	Middle Eastern Studies	Sir Thomas Adams, 1st Baronet	1632		
Lucasian Professor of Mathematics	Applied Mathematics and Theoretical Physics	Henry Lucas	1663		
Knightbridge Professor of Philosophy	Philosophy	John Knightbridge	1683		
Professor of Music	Music		1684		
Yusuf Hamied 1702 Professor of Chemistry	Chemistry	BP; Yusuf Hamied	1702		Formerly BP Professor of Chemistry (1991–2019), Professor of Organic Chemistry (1943–1991) and Professor of Chemistry (1702–1943)
Plumian Professor of Astronomy and Experimental Philosophy	Astronomy	Thomas Plume	1704		
Professor of Anatomy	Physiology, Development, and Neuroscience		1707		
Regius Professor of History	History	George I	1724		Formerly Regius Professor of Modern History (1724–2010)
Regius Professor of Botany	Plant Sciences		1724		Formerly Professor of Botany (1724–2009)
Woodwardian Professor of Geology	Earth Sciences	John Woodward	1728		
Lowndean Professor of Astronomy and Geometry	Pure Mathematics and Mathematical Statistics	Thomas Lowndes	1749		
Norris–Hulse Professor of Divinity	Divinity	John Norris; John Hulse	1777		Formed in 1934 by merger of the Norrisian (1777) and Hulsean (1860) Professorships of Divinity
Jacksonian Professor of Natural Philosophy	Physics	Rev Richard Jackson	1783		
Downing Professor of the Laws of England	Law	Sir George Downing, 3rd Baronet	1800		
Downing Professor of Medicine	Medicine	Sir George Downing, 3rd Baronet	1800	1930	
Professor of Mineralogy	Mineralogy		1808	1931	Replaced by the Professorship of Mineralogy and Petrology in 1931
Lord Almoner's Professor of Arabic	Oriental Languages	The Crown, via the Lord Almoner	1815	1933	Preceded by a readership of the same title (1724–1815)
Disney Professor of Archaeology	Archaeology	John Disney	1851		
Sadleirian Professor of Pure Mathematics	Pure Mathematics and Mathematical Statistics	Lady Mary Sadleir	1860		Preceded by a lectureship of the same title (1748–1864)
Professor of Political Economy	Economics		1863		Title first granted in 1828, permanent professorship established in 1863
Professor of Zoology	Zoology		1866		Formerly Professor of Zoology and Comparative Anatomy (1866–1934)
Whewell Professor of International Law	Law	William Whewell	1867		
Kennedy Professor of Latin	Classics	Friends and former pupils of Benjamin Hall Kennedy	1869		Formerly Professor of Latin (1869–1911)
Slade Professor of Fine Art	History of Art	Felix Slade	1869		
Cavendish Professor of Physics	Physics	William Cavendish, 7th Duke of Devonshire	1871		
Professor of Engineering	Engineering		1875		Formerly Professor of Mechanism and Applied Mechanics (1875–1934) and Professor of Mechanical Science (1934–1966)
Elrington and Bosworth Professor of Anglo-Saxon	Anglo-Saxon, Norse and Celtic	Joseph Bosworth	1878		
Dixie Professor of Ecclesiastical History	History	Wolstan Dixie	1882		Preceded by fellowships of Emmanuel College established from the same endowment
Professor of Physiology	Physiology, Development, and Neuroscience		1883		
Professor of Pathology	Pathology		1883		Also ex officio member of the Faculty Board of Clinical Medicine
Ely Professor of Divinity	Divinity	Canonry of Ely	1889	1980	
Bertrand Russell Professor of Philosophy	Philosophy		1896		Formerly Professor of Philosophy (1934–2010) and Professor of Mental Philosophy and Logic (1896–1934)
Professor of Ancient History	Classics		1898		Also ex officio member of the Faculty Board of History
Drapers Professor of Agriculture	Biology	Worshipful Company of Drapers	1899	1990	
Quick Professor of Biology	Determined upon appointment	Frederick James Quick	1906		
Professor of Astrophysics	Astronomy		1909		
Schröder Professor of German	Modern and Medieval Languages	Messrs J. Henry Schröder and Company	1909		
King Edward VII Professor of English Literature	English	Harold Harmsworth, 1st Viscount Rothermere	1911		
Arthur Balfour Professor of Genetics	Genetics	Reginald Brett, 2nd Viscount Esher	1912		
Serena Professor of Italian	Modern and Medieval Languages	Arthur Serena	1919		
Vere Harmsworth Professor of Imperial and Naval History	History	Harold Harmsworth, 1st Viscount Rothermere	1919		Formerly Vere Harmsworth Professor of Naval History (1919–1933)
Drapers Professor of French	Modern and Medieval Languages	Worshipful Company of Drapers	1919		
Francis Mond Professor of Aeronautical Engineering	Engineering	Emile Mond	1919		
Professor of Physical Chemistry	Chemistry		1920		
Sir William Dunn Professor of Biochemistry	Biochemistry	Sir William Dunn, 1st Baronet, of Lakenheath	1921		
Professor of the History of Political Thought	History	Laura Spelman Rockefeller Memorial	1927		Formerly Professor of Political Science (1927–2010)
Rouse Ball Professor of Mathematics	Pure Mathematics and Mathematical Statistics	W. W. Rouse Ball	1927		
Rouse Ball Professor of English Law	Law	W. W. Rouse Ball	1927		
Professor of Economic History	History		1928		Also ex officio member of the Faculty Board of Economics
Laurence Professor of Ancient Philosophy	Classics	Perceval Maitland Laurence	1930		
Laurence Professor of Classical Archaeology	Classics	Perceval Maitland Laurence	1930		
Montague Burton Professor of Industrial Relations	Economics	Montague Burton	1930		
Professor of Geography	Geography		1931		
Professor of Mineralogy and Petrology	Earth Sciences		1931		Replaced the Professorship of Mineralogy established in 1808
John Humphrey Plummer Professors	Determined upon appointment		1931		
Goldsmiths' Professor of Materials Science	Materials Science and Metallurgy	Worshipful Company of Goldsmiths	1931		
William Wyse Professor of Social Anthropology	Social Anthropology	William Wyse	1932		
Professor of Medieval History	History		1937		
Pitt Professor of American History and Institutions	Determined upon appointment	Cambridge University Press	1944		
Shell Professor of Chemical Engineering	Chemical Engineering and Biotechnology	Royal Dutch Shell	1945		
Herbert Thompson Professor of Egyptology	Oriental Studies	Henry Francis Herbert Thompson	1945	1977	Subsequently re-established as a personal professorship (2005–13)
Hopkinson and Imperial Chemical Industries Professor of Applied Thermodynamics	Engineering	Imperial Chemical Industries	1950		
Smuts Professor of Commonwealth History	History		1952		Formerly Smuts Professor of the History of the British Commonwealth (1952–94)
Professor of Medieval and Renaissance English	English		1954		
Wolfson Professor of Criminology	Criminology		1959		
Sheild Professor of Pharmacology	Pharmacology		1961		
Professor of Mathematical Statistics	Pure Mathematics and Mathematical Statistics		1961		
Frank Ramsey Professor of Economics	Economics		1965		Formerly Professor of Economics (1965–1994)
Sir Kirby Laing Professor of Civil Engineering	Engineering	Kirby Laing Foundation	1966		Formerly Professor of Engineering (1966–2011)
Professor of Geophysics	Earth Sciences		1964		
Churchill Professor of Mathematics for Operational Research	Pure Mathematics and Mathematical Statistics	Esso Petroleum Company Limited	1966		
Joseph Needham Professor of Chinese History, Science, and Civilization	East Asian Studies	East Asian History of Science Foundation; Trinity College	1966		Formerly Professor of Chinese (1966–2008)
Mary Marshall and Arthur Walton Professor of the Physiology of Reproduction	Physiology, Development, and Neuroscience	Francis Marshall	1967		
Simón Bolívar Professor of Latin-American Studies	Determined upon appointment	Government of Venezuela	1968		
Geoffrey Moorhouse Gibson Professor of Chemistry	Chemistry	Trinity College; Geoffrey Moorhouse Gibson Fund	1970		
Rank Professor of Engineering	Engineering		1971		
Arthur Goodhart Visiting Professor in Legal Science	Law	Overbrook Foundation	1971		
Alexander Todd Visiting Professor of Chemistry	Physics & Chemistry		1972		
Professor of Law	Law		1973		
Professor of Obstetrics and Gynaecology	Obstetrics and Gynaecology		1975		
Sheila Joan Smith Professor of Immunology	Medicine	Herchel Smith	1977		Formerly Sheila Joan Smith Professor of Tumour Immunology (1977–1988)
Paul Mellon Professor of American History	History	Andrew W. Mellon Foundation	1980		
Herchel Smith Professor of Medicinal Chemistry	Clinical Medicine	American Friends of Cambridge University	1982		
Charles Darwin Professor of Animal Embryology	School of the Biological Sciences	Edward J. Bles	1982		Previously established as a personal professorship (1967–1981)
Jawaharlal Nehru Visiting Professor	Determined upon appointment	Edward J. Bles	1983		
KPMG Professor of Management Studies	Judge Business School	Peat, Marwick, and Mitchell & Co.	1986		
Professor of Clinical Gerontology	Public Health and Primary Care		1987		
Herchel Smith Professor of Organic Chemistry	Chemistry	American Friends of Cambridge University	1988		
Professor of English and Applied Linguistics	Modern and Medieval Languages		1988		
Sir Alan Cottrell Professor of Materials Science	Materials Science and Metallurgy		1988		Formerly Professor of Materials Science (1988–2012)
Professor of Theoretical Geophysics	Applied Mathematics and Theoretical Physics		1989		
George Pitt-Rivers Professor of Archaeological Science	Archaeology		1990		
Diageo Professor of Management Studies	Judge Business School	Guinness Brewery; Diageo	1990		
Professor of Molecular Endocrinology	Clinical Biochemistry		1990		Formerly Serono Professor of Molecular Endocrinology (1990–2014)
S. J. Berwin Professor of Corporate Law	Law	S. J. Berwin and Co.	1991		
GlaxoSmithKline Professor of Microbial Pathogenesis	Medicine	Glaxo Holdings	1991		
G. I. Taylor Professor of Fluid Mechanics	Applied Mathematics and Theoretical Physics	Gladys Davies	1992		
BBV Foundation Visiting Professor	Determined upon appointment	BBV Foundation, Bilbao	1992		
John Wilfrid Linnett Visiting Professor of Chemistry	Cambridge		1993		
Herchel Smith Professor of Intellectual Property Law	Law	American Friends of Cambridge University	1993		
Professor of Bacterial Evolution	Veterinary Medicine	Marks & Spencer	1996		Formerly Marks & Spencer Professorship of Farm Animal Health, Food Science, and Food Safety (1996–2023)
Beckwith Professor of Management Studies	Judge Business School	Peter Beckwith	1996		
Sir Patrick Sheehy Professor of International Relations	Politics and International Studies	British American Tobacco	1996		
Hans Rausing Professor of History and Philosophy of Science	History and Philosophy of Science		1997		
Ursula Zoëllner Professor of Cancer Research	Oncology	F. A. Zoëllner	1997		
Sinyi Professor of Chinese Management	Judge Business School	Sinyi Foundation	1997		
Robert Sansom Professor of Computer Science	Computer Science and Technology	Robert Sansom	1998		
Dennis Gillings Professor of Health Management	Judge Business School	Dennis Gillings	1998		
Margaret Thatcher Professor of Enterprise Studies	Judge Business School	Margaret Thatcher Foundation	1998		
Unilever Professor of Molecular Sciences Informatics	Chemistry	Unilever	1999		
BP Professor of Petroleum Science	Earth Sciences		1999		
Grosvenor Professor of Real Estate Finance	Land Economy		1999		
Schlumberger Professor of Complex Physical Systems	Applied Mathematics and Theoretical Physics		1999		
Kuwait Professor of Number Theory and Algebra	Pure Mathematics and Mathematical Statistics	Kuwait Foundation for the Advancement of Sciences	2000		Originally limited to a single tenure, established in perpetuity in 2023
N. M. Rothschild & Sons Professor of Mathematical Sciences		N. M. Rothschild & Sons	2001		Ex officio Director of the Isaac Newton Institute for Mathematical Sciences
Marconi Professor of Communications Systems	Computer Science and Technology	Marconi Communications	2001		
Adam Smith Professor of Corporate Governance	Judge Business School	Dennis Kozlowski; Tyco Corporation	2001		Formerly Robert Monks Professorship of Corporate Governance (2001–11)
Van Eck Professor of Engineering	Engineering	Fred van Eck	2001		
Prince Philip Professor of Technology	Engineering		2001		Established to mark the 80th birthday of Prince Philip, Duke of Edinburgh, and the 25th anniversary of his election as Chancellor
Hitachi Professor of Electron Device Physics	Physics	Hitachi Ltd	2002		
Leigh Trapnell Professor of Quantum Physics	Applied Mathematics and Theoretical Physics	Hazel N. Trapnell	2002		
Sandra Dawson Visiting Professor of Marketing, Strategy, and Innovation	Judge Business School	Gianni Montezemolo; Joan Montezemolo	2002		Formerly Visiting Professorship of Marketing, Strategy, and Innovation (2002–2013)
Herschel Smith Professor of Pure Mathematics	Pure Mathematics and Mathematical Statistics	Herchel Smith	2004		
Herchel Smith Professor of Molecular Genetics	Genetics	Herchel Smith	2004		
Bernard Wolfe Professor of Health Neuroscience	Determined upon appointment	Woco Foundation of Canada	2004		
Herchel Smith Professor of Physics	Physics	Herchel Smith	2004		
Herchel Smith Professor of Biochemistry	Biochemistry	Herchel Smith	2005		
French Government Visiting Professor	Modern and Medieval Languages		2005		
Professor of Education	Education		2005		
Herchel Smith Professor of Molecular Biology	Physiology, Development, and Neuroscience	Herchel Smith	2006		
Sigrid Rausing Professor of Social Anthropology	Social Anthropology	Sigrid M. Rausing	2006		Formerly Sigrid Rausing Professor of Collaborative Anthropology (2006–11)
Miriam Rothschild Professor of Conservation Biology	Zoology	Lisbet Rausing Charitable Fund	2006		
His Majesty Sultan Qaboos Bin Said Professor of Modern Arabic Studies	Middle Eastern Studies	Qaboos bin Said al Said	2006		
Genzyme Professor of Experimental Medicine	Medicine	Genzyme Corporation	2006		
Moran Professor of Conservation and Development	Geography	James Wilson; Jane Wilson (née Hepburne Scott)	2006		
Harding Professor of Statistics in Public Life	Pure Mathematics and Mathematical Statistics	Winton Charitable Foundation	2006		Formerly Winton Professor of the Public Understanding of Risk (2006–2020)
Jawaharlal Nehru Professor of Indian Business and Enterprise	Judge Business School	High Commission of India	2007		
Li Ka Shing Professor of Oncology	Oncology	Li Ka Shing Foundation	2007		
Prince Philip Professor of Ecology and Evolutionary Biology	Zoology		2007		Established to mark the thirtieth anniversary of the installation of Prince Philip, Duke of Edinburgh, as Chancellor
Sir Evelyn de Rothschild Professor of Finance	Judge Business School	Eranda Rothchild Foundation	2007		
Professor of Experimental Astrophysics	Physics		2008		
A. G. Leventis Professor of Greek Culture	Classics	A. G. Leventis Foundation	2008		
Joseph Needham Professor of Chinese History, Science, and Civilization					
Tata Steel Professor of Metallurgy	Materials Science and Metallurgy	Tata Steel (UK) Ltd	2008		
Diane Middlebrook and Carl Djerassi Visiting Professor of Gender Studies	Politics and International Studies	Carl Djerassi	2009		
Sir Arthur Marshall Visiting Professor of Urban Design	Architecture	D. G. Marshall of Cambridge Trust	2010		Formerly Sir Arthur Marshall Visiting Professor of Sustainable Urban Design (2010–15)
Visiting Professor of Architecture	Architecture		2010		
Pembroke Visiting Professor of International Finance	Judge Business School		2010		
BP Foundation McKenzie Professor of Earth Sciences	Earth Sciences	BP Foundation	2010		
Humanitas Visiting Professors		Institute for Strategic Dialogue	2010		
Sultan Qaboos Professor of Abrahamic Faiths and Shared Values	Divinity	Qaboos bin Said al Said	2011		
Dyson Professor of Fluid Mechanics	Engineering	Dyson Technology Limited	2011		
Regius Professor of Engineering	Engineering		2011		Established to commemorate the retirement of Prince Philip, Duke of Edinburgh, as Chancellor
Harold Samuel Professor of Law and Environmental Policy	Land Economy	Estate Management Development Fund	2012		
Chong Hua Professor of Chinese Development	Politics and International Studies	Chong Hua Educational Foundation	2012		
John Harvard Professor of the Arts, Humanities, and Social Sciences	Alternating between institutions in the Schools of Arts and Humanities, and of the Humanities and Social Sciences	Robert C. ‘Peter’ Milton; Timothy Joyce; Trinity College	2013		
Stephen W. Hawking Professor of Cosmology	Applied Mathematics and Theoretical Physics	Avery–Tsui Foundation	2014		
LEGO Professor of Play in Education, Development and Learning	Education	The LEGO Foundation	2015		
Janeway Professor of Financial Economics	Economics	Weslie and William Janeway	2015		
El-Erian Professor of Economics	Economics	Mohamed El-Erian	2016		
Sir David Williams Professor of Public Law	Law	Sir David Li, Li family, Robinson College and anonymous benefactors	2016		
Russell R. Geiger Professor of Crop Science	Plant Sciences	Russell R. Geiger	2016		
Al-Kindi Professor	Genetics	King Abdullah University of Science and Technology	2017		
Bennett Professor of Public Policy	Politics and International Studies	Peter W. Bennett	2017		
Dr John C. Taylor Professor of Public Innovation	Engineering	John Taylor	2017		
Jennifer Ward Oppenheimer Professor of the Deep History and Archaeology of Africa	Archaeology	Jonathan and Jennifer Oppenheimer Foundation	2017		
Versus Arthritis Professor of Rheumatology	Medicine	Versus Arthritis	2018		Formerly ARUK Professorship of Rheumatology (2018–2019)
DeepMind Professor of Machine Learning	Computer Science and Technology	DeepMind	2019		
Nanjing Professor of Technology and Innovation	Engineering	Nanjing Healthcare Investment Area and Development Company	2019		
Caroline Humphrey Professor of the Anthropology of Inner Asia	Social Anthropology	Sigrid Rausing Trust	2020		
Sheila Joan Smith Professor of Medicine	Medicine	Herchel Smith	2020		
Gnodde Goldman Sachs Professor of Neuroinformatics	Psychiatry	Goldman Sachs Gives UK on behalf of Richard and Kara Gnodde	2021		
Andreas von Hirsch Professor of Penal Theory and Ethics	Criminology	Andreas von Hirsch	2021		
Professor of Sustainability	School of the Physical Sciences	Trinity College	2023		Established to mark the coronation of Charles III, and associated with a fellowship at Trinity College
1944 Professorship of Electrical Engineering	Electrical Engineering	Institution of Electrical Engineers (IEE)	1944		First professorship established in Electrical Engineering
Dobson Professor of Materials Science and Metallurgy	Materials Science and Metallurgy	The Ann D Foundation	2023		
Hong Kong Jockey Club Professor of Global Health	Medicine	Hong Kong Jockey Club	2024		
Professor of the Public Understanding of Mathematics	Applied Mathematics and Theoretical Physics		2024		

== See also ==
- List of professorships at the University of Oxford
