= David L. McMullen =

British academic and sinologist

David L. McMullen is a British sinologist, specialising in medieval China. He was Professor of Chinese at the University of Cambridge from 1989 to 2006, and was elected a Fellow of the British Academy in 1994.

== Career ==
McMullen was first introduced to Chinese during National Service with the Royal Air Force in Hong Kong at the end of the 1950s. He was part of the effort to intercept and translate Chinese military communications from the British listening station on top of Victoria Peak. He already had a place to read Classics at Cambridge, but his experiences in Hong Kong, and the knowledge of Chinese that he had acquired, caused him to switch to studying Chinese.

McMullen completed his undergraduate degree at St John's College in 1962, and then studied for his Ph.D. under Edwin G. Pulleyblank. He joined the then Faculty of Oriental Studies (Note: Since 2007, the Faculty of Asian and Middle Eastern Studies) at Cambridge in 1968, as assistant lecturer, lecturer and finally Professor of Chinese, a post that he held from 1989 to 2006.

He was elected a Fellow of the British Academy in 1994.

== Selected works ==
- Wright, Arthur F.; Twitchett, Denis Crispin, eds. (1973). "Historical and Literary Theory in the Mid-Eighth Century". Perspectives on the T'ang. Yale University Press. ISBN 978-0-608-11729-4.
- Concordances and Indexes to Chinese Texts. San Francisco: Chinese Materials Center. 1975.
- State and Scholars in T'ang China. Cambridge University Press. 27 May 1988. ISBN 978-0-521-32991-0.
- McMullen, David L. (1989). "The Death of Chou Li-chen: Imperially Ordered Suicide or Natural Causes?". Asia Major. 2 (2): 23–82. ISSN 0004-4482. JSTOR 41645436.
- McMullen, D. L.; McMullen, David (2001). "Recollection without Tranquility: Du Fu, the Imperial Gardens and the State". Asia Major. 14 (2): 189–252. ISSN 0004-4482. JSTOR 41645580.
