= Cecil Edgar Tilley =

Australian-British petrologist and geologist

- Born: 14 May 1894; Unley, Adelaide, Australia
- Died: 24 January 1973 (aged 78); Cambridge, England
- Education: PhD (1922)
- Alma mater: Cambridge, UK
- Occupations: Petrologist and geologist

Cecil Edgar Tilley FRS, Hon FRSE, PGS (14 May 1894 – 24 January 1973) was an Australian-British petrologist and geologist.

== Life ==
Tilley was born in Unley, Adelaide, the youngest child of John Thomas Edward Tilley, a civil engineer from London, and his wife South Australia-born wife, Catherine Jane Nicholas.

He was educated at Adelaide High School, then studied Chemistry and Geology under William Rowan Browne at the University of Adelaide, and the University of Sydney, graduating in 1915. In 1916, during the First World War, he went to South Queensferry near Edinburgh in Scotland to work as a chemist Department of Explosives Supply. He returned to Australia in December 1918.

He won an Exhibition of 1851 scholarship to the University of Cambridge in 1919, where he studied petrology under Alfred Harker, and completed his PhD in 1922. From 1923 he was employed at Cambridge University, first as demonstrator in petrology, and then lecturer in petrology in 1929. In 1931, following the retirement of Harker, he was appointed as the first professor of Mineralogy and Petrology. Most of the remainder of his life was spent in England, though he spent 1938–1939 in Australia and visited regularly after the Second World War.

In 1929, while investigating a volcanic plug at Scawt Hill, near Larne, Northern Ireland for the Mineralogical Magazine, Tilley identified and named the new minerals larnite and scawtite.

In 1938, he was elected a fellow of the Royal Society of London and served as their vice president in 1949/50. He won the society's Royal Medal in 1967.

From 1948 to 1951, Tilley was president of the Mineralogical Society of Great Britain and Ireland. He was president of the Geological Society 1949/50. He was elected an honorary fellow of the Royal Society of Edinburgh in 1957.

He died at home in Cambridge on 24 January 1973 aged 78, and his body was cremated.

== Family ==
In 1928, Tilley married Irene Doris Marshall at Holy Trinity Church, Kingsway, London. They had one daughter.

== Publications ==
- XXV.—Metamorphism in Relation to Structure in the Scottish Highlands (1931) co-written with Gertrude Lilian Elles doi:10.1017/S0080456800016513
- Alfred Harker 1859-1939 (1940) co-written with Albert Seward
- Waldemar Christofer Brogger 1851-1940 (1941)
- Hawaiian Volcanoes (1961); brief description, U.H. Hilo Center for Maunakea Stewardship
- Origin of Basalt Magmas (1962) co-written with H. S. Yoder Jr. doi:10.1093/petrology/3.3.342

Academic offices
| Preceded by Professorship of Mineralogy (held by A. Hutchinson) | Professor of Mineralogy and Petrology, University of Cambridge; 1931-1961 | Succeeded by W.A. Deer |
