= Nick Bowen =

Nick or Nicholas Bowen may refer to:

== People ==
- Nicholas "Nick" Bowen, president of the Chartered Institute of Linguists
- Nick Bowen, CEO of Macmahon Holdings
- Nicholas Bowen, educator
- Nicholas Bowen, in the Peninsula Campaign Union Order of Battle

== Fictional characters ==
- Nick Bowen, character in Best Friends Getting Sorted
- Nick Bowen, character played by Stephen Graham (actor) in Where The Heart Is
