= Professorship of Mineralogy and Petrology (Cambridge) =

The Professorship of Mineralogy and Petrology is a statutory professorship at the University of Cambridge. It was created in 1931 following the simultaneous retirements of Alfred Harker, from the post of Reader in Petrology in the Department of Geology, Cambridge; and of Arthur Hutchinson, Professor of Mineralogy. A committee of the Council of the Senate of the university proposed that these two posts be discontinued, and the remit of the Professorship of Mineralogy be expanded to include the disciplines of petrology and crystallography. The Professorship was established in the newly created Department of Mineralogy and Petrology. The first incumbent was Prof Cecil Edgar Tilley, who was appointed in 1931. Tilley was succeeded in 1961 by William Alexander Deer. Since 1980, and following the appointment of Ron Oxburgh, the Professorship has been associated with the Department of Earth Sciences, Cambridge. The other statutory professorships in this department are the Woodwardian Professor of Geology, the Professor of Geophysics, established in 1966, and the recently endowed BP Foundation McKenzie Professorship of Earth Sciences, established in 2010.

== Professors of Mineralogy and Petrology ==
- Cecil Edgar Tilley (1931 - 1961)
- WA Deer (1961 - 1975)
- Ron Oxburgh (1978 - 1991)
- Ekhard Salje (1994 - 2015)
- Nick Tosca (2020 - )

== See also ==
List of professorships at the University of Cambridge
