= Nicholas Bowen =

British businessman

Nicholas Robert Bowen, FCIL, also known as Nick Bob Bowen, is a head teacher and promoter of enterprise. He was the head teacher at St Benet Biscop Catholic High School, Bedlington, Northumberland from 2001 to 2012. In 2010, he was awarded the Queen's Award for Enterprise Promotion. He is, as of 2015, the principal at Horizon Community College, Barnsley, a position he has held since 2012.

== St Benet Biscop Catholic High School ==
While head teacher at St Benet Biscop Catholic High School, Bedlington, Bowen led the development of the school's enterprise agenda from 2001-2012. The school gained Specialist Business and Enterprise College status in 2005 and in 2006 it opened a Business and Learning Centre. sponsored by Cooperative Group. The school had a national reputation for engaging with local business. The school twice represented the North East in the National Young Enterprise Competition.

== Benet Enterprises ==
Because of the success of the student enterprises, Bowen set up a social enterprise, based on these ventures. Called Benet Enterprises Ltd., it was a successful venture based off-site in the town centre offering commercial services to local business. The enterprise was funded by Alcan, through the Go Wansbeck LEGI. Thus Bowen had established the first commercially viable social enterprise to incubate student's ideas. He was awarded the Queen's Award for Enterprise Promotion in part for this work. In 2008 Benet Enterprises, working with Go Wansbeck and Northumberland Strategic Partnership enabled nearly a thousand pupils to visit local companies and see how they work.

Bowen inspired schools "in Northumberland and now as far afield as Leeds to do the same".

As a result of the social enterprise a number of businesses were founded by pupils.

== Other enterprise promotion ==
Bowen worked with Go Wansbeck Local Enterprise Growth Initiative Board, where he was instrumental obtaining £11.8m for business regeneration, which included £1m for young people's enterprise education. He also worked with the Wansbeck Enterprise Education Network, and brought together a network of organisations resulting in a culture change in favour of enterprise and entrepreneurship.

== Horizon Community College ==
Bowen was the inaugural head of Horizon, a local authority school formed by the merger of two schools, in 2012.

In 2013 he was appointed chairman of the South Yorkshire School Games, which were partly hosted at Horizon Community College that year.

In June 2014, due to falling rolls, he announced redundancy of 40 staff, including at least eight teaching staff.
