= The Marshall Library =

The Marshall Library may refer to:

- Marshall Library of Economics in Cambridge, England
- The Marshall Library of the George C. Marshall Foundation in Lexington, Kentucky
- Drinko Library or Morrow Library on the campus of Marshall University in Huntington, West Virginia
