= Malcolm Ferguson-Smith =

British geneticist (1931–2026)

Malcolm Ferguson-Smith FRS FRSE
- Born: Malcolm Andrew Ferguson-Smith; 5 September 1931; Glasgow, Scotland
- Died: 4 February 2026 (aged 94)
- Education: Stowe School, University of Glasgow (MB ChB)
- Known for: Mapping the Y-linked sex determinant in XX males
- Children: Anne Ferguson-Smith
- Scientific career
- Institutions: Johns Hopkins University; University of Glasgow; University of Cambridge; Western Infirmary
- Website: research.vet.cam.ac.uk/research-staff-directory/principal-investigators/systems-pathology/malcom-ferguson-smith

Malcolm Andrew Ferguson-Smith, FRS, FRSE (5 September 1931 – 4 February 2026) was a British geneticist.

== Early life and education ==
Ferguson-Smith was born in Glasgow on 5 September 1931, the son of physician John Ferguson-Smith and educated at Stowe School. He graduated from the University of Glasgow in 1955 with a Bachelor of Medicine, Bachelor of Surgery degree.

== Career and research ==
In 1955–1956, he was house physician and house surgeon at the Western Infirmary in Glasgow and in 1956–1958 senior house officer (SHO) and registrar in pathology.

=== Johns Hopkins ===
In 1959, he was appointed a Fellow in Medicine at the School of Medicine, Johns Hopkins University, Baltimore where he worked on chromosome analysis for nearly three years, establishing the first human chromosome diagnostic laboratory in the USA.

=== Return to Glasgow ===
In 1961, he returned to the Department of Genetics at the University of Glasgow and was appointed lecturer, senior lecturer and reader successively, becoming the first Burton Professor of Medical Genetics in 1973. Apart from teaching genetics to medical students, his duties involved the establishment of a Regional Genetics Service for the West of Scotland. This provided opportunities for contributing to the human gene map using familial chromosome polymorphisms, deletion mapping, in situ hybridisation and chromosome sorting by flow cytometry. His work on mapping the Y-linked sex determinant in XX males led to the isolation of the mammalian sex-determining gene twenty-five years later.

=== Gene mapping ===
In 1987, he was appointed professor and head of the Department of Pathology at University of Cambridge and director of the East Anglia Regional Genetics Service, where he furthered his research on gene mapping. He retired as head of pathology in 1998 and moved to the University Department of Veterinary Medicine. In 2002, he established the Cambridge Resource Centre for Comparative Genomics which produced and distributed chromosome-specific DNA from over 120 species of animals, birds and fish to scientists worldwide for research in biology, evolution and gene mapping. This data allowed comparisons between species to be made and mapped, illuminating the relationships between species and allowing research into genomic evolution.

== Personal life and death ==
Ferguson-Smith died on 4 February 2026, at the age of 94. He was the father of Anne Ferguson-Smith, Arthur Balfour Professor of Genetics in Cambridge.

== Publications ==
- Translocation of c-abl oncogene in chronic myelocytic leukaemia
- Early Prenatal Diagnosis (1983)
- Prenatal Diagnosis & Screening (1992)
- Essential Medical Genetics (5 edn, 1997)

== Awards and honours ==
In 1998, he was appointed the scientist member of Lord Phillips' Committee to review the UK Government's original Bovine Spongiform Encephalopathy (BSE) inquiry and consider the emergence of BSE and new variant Creutzfeldt–Jakob disease (CJD) and the actions taken, reporting in 2000.

He was elected Fellow of the Royal Society of Edinburgh (FRSE) in 1978 and a Fellow of the Royal Society (FRS) in 1983. He was elected a Fellow of the Academy of Medical Sciences (FMedSci) in 1998. His papers are held at University of Glasgow.
