= David Glover (geneticist) =

British geneticist

David Glover FRS FRSE
- Born: David Moore Glover; March 28, 1948 (age 78); Chapeltown, South Yorkshire
- Education: Broadway Technical Grammar School, Barnsley; University of Cambridge (BA, ScD); University of London (PhD)
- Spouse: Magdalena Żernicka-Goetz (m. 2000)
- Awards: EMBO Member (1978)
- Scientific career
- Fields: Mitosis; Meiosis; Centrosomes
- Workplaces: Imperial Cancer Research Fund; University College London; Stanford University; Imperial College; University of Dundee; University of Cambridge; California Institute of Technology
- Thesis: The synthesis of polyoma virus specific RNA in mouse cells

David Moore Glover FRS FRSE (born 28 March 1948) is a British geneticist and Research Professor of Biology and Biological Engineering at the California Institute of Technology. He served as Balfour Professor of Genetics at the University of Cambridge, a Wellcome Trust investigator in the Department of Genetics at the University of Cambridge, and Fellow of Fitzwilliam College, Cambridge. He serves as the first editor-in-chief of the open-access journal Open Biology published by the Royal Society.

== Education ==
Glover was educated at Broadway Technical Grammar School, Barnsley and Fitzwilliam College, University of Cambridge. He undertook his PhD research in the Imperial Cancer Research Fund laboratories as a student of University College London.

== Career and research ==
As a Damon Runyon Fellow at Stanford University he participated in the Recombinant DNA revolution and discovered sequences that interrupted the ribosomal genes of Drosophila. On establishing his independent laboratory at Imperial College London in 1975, he later showed that these were ancient transposable elements. Together with Peter Rigby, Jean Beggs and David Lane, he co-directed a combined research group exploiting the new techniques of recombinant DNA research. In 1978 he was elected Member of the European Molecular Biology Organization (EMBO).

While at Imperial, Glover was awarded a 10-year personal fellowship from the UK's Cancer Research Campaign that allowed him open up a new area of research pioneering the use of Drosophila as a model in which to study cell cycle regulation. He began by characterising the duplication cycles of centrosomes in the rapid nuclear division cycles of Drosophila embryos. This led to genetic studies that allowed him to discover and name the Polo and Aurora protein kinases, required for the function of centrosomes at the poles of mitotic spindles.

In 1989, he relinquished his position as Head of the Department of Biochemistry at Imperial to move to the University of Dundee, where with David and Birgitte Lane he established the Cancer Research Campaign Laboratories, Dundee. Here his work demonstrated Polo not only to be required at centrosomes in Drosophila but also for cytokinesis.

In Dundee he continued to use Drosophila as a means to uncover new components of the mitotic apparatus and its regulatory circuits. These studies uncovered spindle pole molecules whose functions were regulated by Polo kinase; a germ line specific Cdc25 phosphatase that regulates meiotic entry; and demonstrated the roles of PP1 and PP2A protein phosphatases as negative mitotic regulators. His contribution to science in Scotland was recognised by his election to Fellow of the Royal Society of Edinburgh (FRSE).

In 1999, Glover moved to the University of Cambridge to become the 6th Arthur Balfour Professor of Genetics and Head of Department. In Cambridge he discovered the second main Aurora B kinase required for cells to progress through metaphase and used genetic approaches to identify and demonstrate the roles of the Greatwall kinase in inhibiting protein phosphase 2A during mitotic entry and progression. Over the past decade he has uncovered the major steps of centriole duplication by demonstrating that Polo-like-kinase 4 (Plk4) is its master regulator; Plk4 expression can drive the de novo formation of centrioles in unfertilised Drosophila eggs. In searching for Plk4's partners, his group identified Asterless (Cep152 in human cells) as required for bringing Plk4 to centrioles and an F-box protein, Slimb – a component of the SCF ubiquitin protein ligase, as responsible for targeting excess Plk4 for destruction. They showed that Plk4 phosphorylates the centriole protein Ana2/STIL to enable it to bind the "cartwheel protein" Sas6 and thus initiate procentriole formation, the first step of centriole duplication.

In 2019, the Glover Lab moved to the California Institute of Technology in USA.

Glover's group are now studying the consequences of supernumerary centrosomes in a variety of mammalian tissues and their consequences for the balance of cell proliferation and differentiation in the skin and pancreas.

== Personal life ==
Glover married Magdalena Żernicka-Goetz in 2000.
