= Professor of Political Economy (Cambridge) =

Professorship at the University of Cambridge

The Professorship of Political Economy is a permanently established professorship at the University of Cambridge, founded in 1863, and assigned to the Faculty of Economics. The professorship was established in perpetuity following the retirement of George Pryme, who had been elected the first Professor of Political Economy at the university on a single-tenure basis.

The university has established two further Professorships of Political Economy for single tenures (i.e. as personal professorships), one in the Department of Politics and Internal Studies in 2016 and one in the Department of Geography in 2017.

== Professors of Political Economy (1863) ==
- Henry Fawcett (1863)
- Alfred Marshall (1884)
- Arthur Cecil Pigou (1908)
- Dennis Robertson (1944)
- James Meade (1957)
- William Brian Reddaway (1969)
- Robert Charles Oliver Matthews (1980)
- Anthony Barnes Atkinson (1992)
- James Mirrlees (1995)
- Aldo Rustichini (2007)
- Oliver Linton (2011)

== Professors of Political Economy (single-tenure establishments) ==
- George Pryme (1828–1863)
- Helen Thompson (2016–)
- Bhaskar Vira (2017–)

== See also ==
- List of professorships at the University of Cambridge
