= Herchel Smith Professor of Pure Mathematics =

The Herchel Smith Professorship of Pure Mathematics is a professorship in pure mathematics at the University of Cambridge. It was established in 2004 by a benefaction from Herchel Smith "of £14.315m, to be divided into five equal parts, to support the full endowment of five Professorships in the fields of Pure Mathematics, Physics, Biochemistry, Molecular Biology, and Molecular Genetics." When the position was advertised in 2004, the first holder was expected to focus on mathematical analysis.

== List of Herchel Smith Professors of Pure Mathematics ==
- 2006–2013 Ben J. Green
- 2019–present Pierre Raphael
