= Aldo Rustichini =

Italian-born American economist

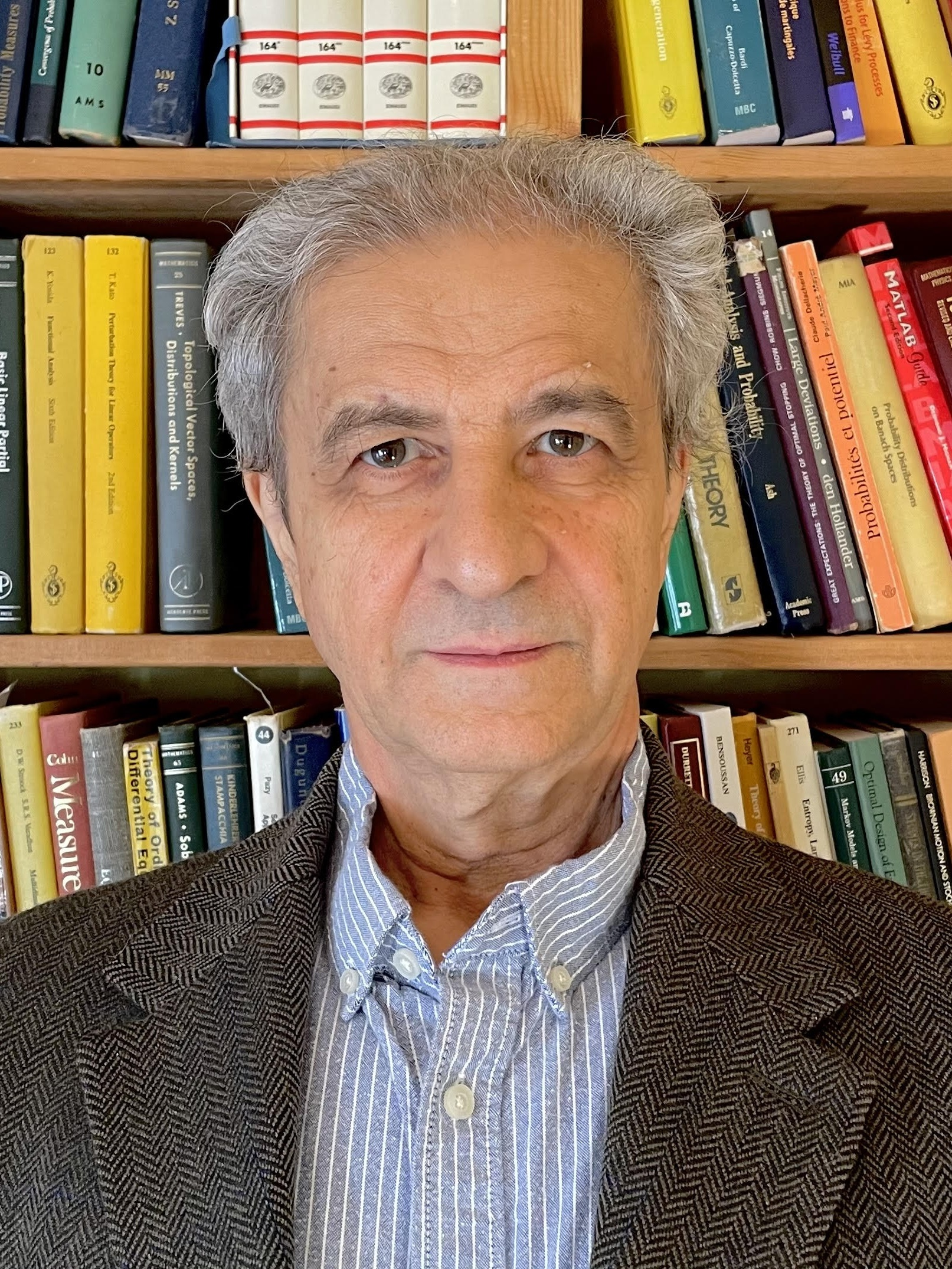
- Occupations: Economist, academic and researcher
- Awards: Fellowship, Econometric Society; Fellowship, the Game Theory Society

Academic background
- Education: B.A., Philosophy; M.A., Economics; Ph.D., Mathematics
- Alma mater: University of Florence; University of Manchester; University of Minnesota
- Website: https://sites.google.com/view/aldorustichini

Aldo Rustichini is an Italian-born American economist, academic and researcher. He is a professor of economics at University of Minnesota, where is also associated with the Interdisciplinary Center for Cognitive Sciences.

Rustichini has worked on several research areas relating to economics, including decision theory, game theory, general equilibrium theory, neuroscience and economics, experimental economics, and behavioral economics. He has also conducted research on political economy, microeconomic theory, economic dynamics, macroeconomics and models of bounded rationality.

Rustichini is a fellow of the Econometric Society and a Council Member of the Game Theory Society.

== Education ==
Rustichini graduated in philosophy from University of Florence in 1977. He then received his master's degree in economics in 1980 from University of Manchester in UK and later received his doctoral degree in mathematics in 1987 from University of Minnesota in the US.

== Career ==
Rustichini taught economics at University of Wisconsin briefly before joining Northwestern University as an assistant professor of economics in 1989. He left Northwestern University and taught at New York University from 1992 till 1993, and later joined Université catholique de Louvain as a professor of economics. From 1996 till 1999, Rustichini taught as a research professor of microeconomics at Tilburg University, before being briefly associated with Boston University’s Department of Economics. In 2000, he joined University of Minnesota as a professor of economics. He held the Professorship of Political Economy at the Faculty of Economics, University of Cambridge, in 2007–2008. In 2009, Rustichini rejoined University of Minnesota as a professor of economics.

== Research ==
Rustichini's work is focused in the areas of decision theory, game theory, general equilibrium theory, economic dynamics, neuroeconomics, experimental economics, behavioral economics, microeconomic theory, models of bounded rationality, and political economy.

=== Neuroeconomics ===
Rustichini has conducted research in the area of neuroeconomics. He conducted a study to investigate the neural underpinnings of the effect of social comparison on risky choices. He measured brain activity of participants who conducted private and social decision making, through functional MRI. His study revealed that the influence of social comparison on the decision process was mediated by the interplay between reward and social reasoning networks. He also studied the merit principle and the causes of social reward differences encoded in human brain. He also investigated how individuals respond to the comparison between their outcome and the outcomes of others, and how this comparison is affected by the reason of the difference.

In 2020, Rustichini conducted a study to investigate the contribution of cognitive and non-cognitive skills to intergenerational social mobility and found that genetic factors, along with the cognitive and non-cognitive skills influenced the re-ordering of social standing that takes place across generations.

=== Intelligence and economic behavior ===
Rustichini has investigated the relationship between intelligence, and economic and strategic behavior, jointly with the examination of the genetic determinants of intelligence. In the analysis of strategic behavior, his research has established that the probability of cooperation in repeated non-zero-sum games increases with the average intelligence of the group. His works identifies the pathways of the effect in the reduction of errors in the implementation of strategies. According to his research, intelligence operates through the effectiveness of working memory; cooperation in turn is the outcome more of cognitive ability than social preferences. He has also shown that when groups of different intelligence meet cooperation increases in groups of lower intelligence.

=== Decision theory ===
Rustichini conducted research on the integration of classical decision theory and personality theory and proposed steps towards a theory of economic decision. His study indicated that the integration of the two theories provided the conceptual structure for understanding the effects of personality traits on economics preferences, and the effects of cognitive and non-cognitive skills on economic behavior and success. He also studied the behavioral foundation of interdependent preferences and focused on establishing an axiomatic foundation that provided a link between observation of choices and a convenient functional representation. His study highlighted the Festinger's view and Veblen's view regarding the nature of interdependent preferences.

=== Social justice and merit ===
Rustichini conducted several studies to investigate the effect of wealth level and the degree on inequality on growth and found a direct relation between the level of wealth and growth, given that the incentives to domestic accumulation are weakened by redistributive considerations. He also presented a field study which contradicted the hypothesis according to which, the occurrence of the behavior subject to the fine is reduced with an introduction of a penalty that leaves everything else unchanged.

In the early 2000s, Rustichini authored a paper focusing on gender differences in high-ranking positions and presented experimental evidence to support that women may be less effective than men in competitive environments which accounted for the significant gender gap in performance.

== Awards and honors ==
- 2004 - Fellowship, Econometric Society
- 2013 - Editor's Award for Experimental Economics, Economic Science Association
- 2015 - Fellowship, the Game Theory Society
- 2017 - Nominee for Maurice Allais Prize in Economic Science award, Maurice Allais Foundation

== Bibliography ==
- Gneezy, U., & Rustichini, A. (2000). A fine is a price. The Journal of Legal Studies, 29(1), 1–17.
- Gneezy, U., & Rustichini, A. (2000). Pay enough or don't pay at all. The Quarterly journal of economics, 115(3), 791–810.
- Gneezy, U., Niederle, M., & Rustichini, A. (2003). Performance in competitive environments: Gender differences. The quarterly journal of economics, 118(3), 1049–1074.
- Maccheroni, F., Marinacci, M., & Rustichini, A. (2006). Ambiguity aversion, robustness, and the variational representation of preferences. Econometrica, 74(6), 1447–1498.
- Okbay, A., Beauchamp, J. P., Fontana, M. A., Lee, J. J., Pers, T. H., Rietveld, C. A., ... & Oskarsson, S. (2016). Genome-wide association study identifies 74 loci associated with educational attainment. Nature, 533(7604), 539–542.
