= Joseph Needham Professor of Chinese History, Science, and Civilization =

The Joseph Needham Professorship of Chinese History, Science and Civilisation (李約瑟漢學教授席位) is the senior professorship of Chinese at the University of Cambridge.

The chair is the successor to the Professorship of Chinese, founded in 1888 and the first of three successive Chinese professorships at Cambridge. The first chair was created for the single tenure of Sir Thomas Wade and did not entitle the holder to a stipend. Following Wade's retirement, this first establishment was renewed once for the tenure of Herbert Giles, but was then suppressed.

A new chair, the Professorship of Chinese Language and History, was established in 1933, again for a single tenure. The professorship was re-established in 1938 for a second tenure; and again in 1952 for a third tenure, this time retitled to the Professorship of Chinese. The second chair expired after the tenure of its third incumbent.

The current chair was permanently established in 1966 as the Professorship of Chinese. In 2008, this professorship was endowed with £2,000,000 and renamed in honour of Joseph Needham 李約瑟.

== Professors of Chinese (1888) ==
- 1888–1895 Sir Thomas Wade 威妥瑪
- 1897–1932 Herbert Giles 翟理斯

== 1933 professorship ==
=== Professors of Chinese Language and History ===
- 1933–1938 Arthur Christopher Moule
- 1938–1951 Gustav Haloun 哈隆

=== Professor of Chinese ===
- 1953–1966 Edwin G. Pulleyblank

== 1966 professorship ==
=== Professors of Chinese ===
- 1968–1981 Denis C. Twitchett 崔瑞德
- 1985–1988 Glen Dudbridge 杜德橋
- 1989–2006 David L. McMullen 麥大維
- 2007–2008 Roel Sterckx 胡司德 (professorship retitled in 2008)

=== Joseph Needham Professor of Chinese History, Science, and Civilization ===
- 2008– Roel Sterckx 胡司德 (incumbent since 2007)
