= Melvill Jones =

British engineer

Sir Bennett Melvill Jones, CBE AFC FRS (28 January 1887 – 31 October 1975) was Francis Mond Professor of Aeronautical Engineering at the University of Cambridge from 1919 to 1952. He demonstrated the importance of streamlining in aircraft design. It had been known since the time of Aristotle, that a moving body passing through air or another fluid encounters resistance (aerodynamic drag), but Jones developed the ideas of Louis Charles Breguet into a refined theory to demonstrate emphatically the importance of drag to the performance of aircraft.

== Origin and education ==
He was the eldest of the three children of Benedict Jones, a barrister, and Henrietta Cornelia Melvill, the South African widow of George William Bennett. His father served as mayor of Birkenhead. Jones was born in Rock Ferry, a suburb of Birkenhead. After attending a preparatory school in Rock Ferry, he was educated at Birkenhead School from 1898–1906. He recalled having great admiration for the headmaster who allowed him to give up cricket to give him more time to work with his father on engineering projects. He graduated with a first class honours degree from Emmanuel College, Cambridge in the mechanical sciences tripos in 1909.

== Early career and military service ==
After university he worked at the Royal Arsenal, Woolwich in their workshop and was there until January 1911 when he joined in the Aerodynamics Department of the National Physical Laboratory at Teddington and then at Armstrong Whitworths where he worked on the design of airships until the outbreak of war in 1914. He was then seconded to the Royal Aircraft Factory, later the Royal Aircraft Establishment, where he worked on aerial gunnery until 1916 when he was transferred to the Air Armaments Experimental Station at Orfordness, which had established by Bertram Hopkinson who was then Head of the Engineering Department at Cambridge. Whilst there, Melvill learned to fly and served as a gunner for about six weeks in 1918 in a Bristol Fighter in No. 48 Squadron RAF with his younger brother, Benedict Henry Melvill Jones, as pilot. He was awarded the Air Force Cross and promoted to lieutenant-colonel (Benedict was killed in 1918 on an experimental flight.)

== After First World War ==
In March 1919 Jones returned to Cambridge as a fellow of Emmanuel College and a member of staff of the Engineering Department. In October he was elected as the first Francis Mond Professor of Aeronautical Engineering in which position he remained until his retirement in 1952.

At Cambridge, the Air Ministry provided aircraft and flying facilities to develop a successful school of aviation research. With characteristic modesty he said that he expected his small team, usually four, to work with him rather than for him. His work on stalls led to a great understanding of the phenomenon and may have greatly reduced accidents.

From 1926 his work was principally connected with reducing drag. In 1929 his paper The Streamline Airplane presented to the Royal Aeronautical Society was seminal. He proposed an ideal aircraft that would have minimal drag which led to the concepts of a 'clean' monoplane and retractable undercarriage. The aspect of Jones's paper that most shocked the designers of the time was his plot of the horse power required versus velocity, for an actual and an ideal plane. By looking at a data point for a given aircraft and extrapolating it horizontally to the ideal curve, the velocity gain for the same power can be seen. When Jones finished his presentation, a member of the audience described the results as being of the same level of importance as the Carnot cycle in thermodynamics.

== Second World War ==
Before the Second World War, he was asked to return to his work on gunnery. His four years of work led to the development of the gyroscopic gunsight. In 1943 he moved to the Ministry of Aircraft Production and became chairman of the Aeronautical Research Committee (later Council) until 1946 In 1946 he resumed his work on drag. After retirement he became a consultant for the Royal Aircraft Establishment.

== Honours ==
In the King's Birthday Honours 1938 Jones was appointed a Commander of the Order of the British Empire, and in the New Year Honours 1942 was appointed a Knight Bachelor. Jones was elected Fellow of the Royal Society and awarded the Medal of Freedom by the US in 1947 for his work on aerial gunnery and he was awarded the Gold Medal of the Royal Aeronautical Society and became an honorary fellow of the society in 1951.

== Personal ==
In 1916 he married Dorothy Laxton (née Jotham) (died 1955). They had a daughter, Margaret (b 1917) and two sons, Warren (b 1920) and Geoffrey (b 1923). Warren was a pilot who was killed in action in 1940. Geoffrey Melvill Jones is a vestibular physiologist, medical doctor, and a pioneer in aviation medical research. Sir Bennett Melvill Jones was a strong swimmer and keen rock climber. He was regarded as 'one of the kindest and friendliest of men'. He died in Devon on 31 October 1975. -
