= Anne Ferguson-Smith =

Mammalian developmental geneticist (born 1961)

Anne Ferguson-Smith CBE FRS FMedSci
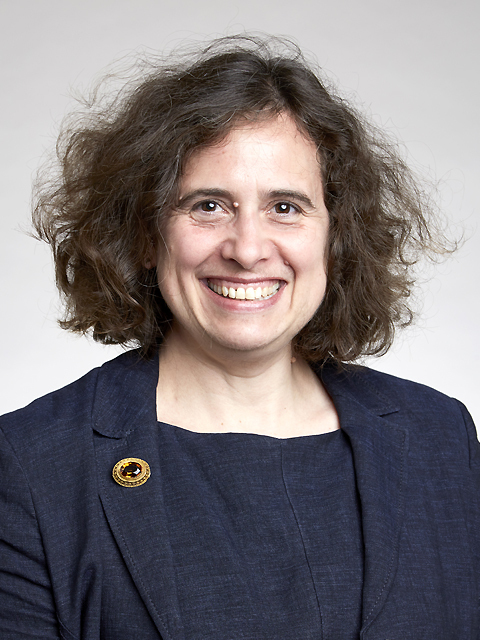
- Ferguson-Smith in 2017
- Born: Anne Carla Ferguson-Smith; 23 July 1961 (age 65); Baltimore, Maryland, U.S.
- Education: University of Glasgow (BSc); Yale University (PhD)
- Spouse: Mark McHarg (m. 1988)
- Children: 2
- Father: Malcolm Ferguson-Smith
- Awards: Suffrage Science award (2014); Wilbur Cross Medal
- Scientific career
- Fields: Genetics; Epigenetics; Genomic imprinting; Functional genomics
- Workplaces: University of Cambridge
- Thesis: A genomic analysis of the human homeobox gene loci HOX 1 and HOX 2 (1989)
- Doctoral advisor: Frank Ruddle
- Other academic advisors: Azim Surani
- Website: www.ukri.org/people/anne-ferguson-smith/

Anne Carla Ferguson-Smith (born 23 July 1961) is a mammalian developmental geneticist. She is the executive chair of the Biotechnology and Biological Sciences Research Council (BBSRC), Arthur Balfour Professor of Genetics and former pro-vice chancellor for Research and International Partnerships at the University of Cambridge. Formerly head of the Department of Genetics at the University of Cambridge, she is a Fellow of Darwin College, Cambridge and serves as president of the Genetics Society.

Ferguson-Smith is an authority on genomic imprinting and the epigenetic control of genome function in health and disease, and is recognised for her work on parental-origin effects and epigenetic mechanisms. Her work has uncovered epigenetically regulated processes in development and over the life course, and identified key in vivo mechanisms involved in the maintenance of epigenetic states. She also explores communication between the environment and the genome with implications for health, disease and inheritance.

== Education ==
Anne Carla Ferguson-Smith was born on 23 July 1961 in Baltimore, Maryland, United States. She was educated at the University of Glasgow where she was awarded a Bachelor of Science degree in molecular biology. She moved to the biology department at Yale University to undertake a PhD identifying human Hox genes and characterising mammalian Hox clusters, supervised by Frank Ruddle.

== Career and research ==
Ferguson-Smith conducted postdoctoral research with Azim Surani at the University of Cambridge from 1989 to 1994, where she initiated molecular studies on genomic imprinting - the process causing genes to be expressed according to their parental origin. The team identified one of the first endogenous imprinted genes, and showed that the process was epigenetically regulated by DNA methylation.

Her subsequent research in the Department of Physiology Development and Neuroscience (formerly Anatomy) at the University of Cambridge identified functions for, and regulatory mechanisms of, genomic imprinting, and contributed to its establishment as a model for understanding the epigenetic control of mammalian genome function. This work resulted in the characterisation of pathways important in mammalian development and growth, in the regulation of metabolism, and in the control of adult neurogenesis.

In 2013, she was appointed professor and head of the Department of Genetics at the University of Cambridge and became the seventh Arthur Balfour Professor of Genetics in 2015. Her research continues to forge links between DNA sequence, epigenetic modifications and gene regulation, and their impact on phenotype; and the mechanisms and implications of epigenetic inheritance.

=== Honours and awards ===
Ferguson-Smith was elected a Fellow of the Academy of Medical Sciences (FMedSci) in 2002, was awarded EMBO Membership in 2006 and elected a Fellow of the Royal Society (FRS) in 2017 She won the Suffrage Science award in 2014 and was awarded the Buchanan Medal of the Royal Society in 2021. In 2024, she received the Wilbur Cross Medal from Yale University.

She was appointed Commander of the Order of the British Empire (CBE) in the 2023 Birthday Honours for services to medical research. She is an executive chair of Biotechnology and Biological Sciences Research Council.

== Personal life ==
Ferguson-Smith married Mark Gregory McHarg in 1988, with whom she has a son and a daughter. She is the daughter of Malcolm Ferguson-Smith, also a geneticist.
