= Roel Sterckx =

Belgian-British sinologist and anthropologist

- Born: 1969 (age 56–57); Belgium
- Education: KU Leuven; National Taiwan University; University of Cambridge (PhD)
- Scientific career
- Fields: Chinese history, anthropology
- Workplaces: Cambridge University
- Academic advisors: Mark Edward Lewis

Chinese name
- Chinese: 胡司德
Transcriptions
Standard Mandarin
- Hanyu Pinyin: Hú Sīdé

Roel Sterckx FBA (born 1969) is a Flemish-British sinologist and anthropologist. He is the Joseph Needham Professor of Chinese History, Science, and Civilization at Cambridge University, and a fellow of Clare College.

== Life and career ==
Sterckx grew up in Retie, Belgium, and attended secondary school at the Sint-Jan Berchmanscollege in Mol. He read sinology at the Katholieke Universiteit Leuven (1991). He went on to study Chinese philosophy at National Taiwan University before moving to Cambridge (Clare Hall), where he obtained a Ph.D. in Oriental studies (1997). He was a research fellow at Oxford (Wolfson College) and taught at the University of Arizona before returning to Cambridge in 2002. He served as Secretary-General of the European Association for Chinese Studies from 2006 to 2012, and has been a long-serving trustee of the Needham Research Institute. In 2013 he was elected Fellow of the British Academy.

== Selected works ==
- The Animal and the Daemon in Early China. Albany: SUNY Press, 2002.
- Of Tripod and Palate: Food, Politics and Religion in Traditional China. New York: Palgrave MacMillan, 2005.
- De l'Esprit aux Esprits: Enquête sur la notion de shen en Chine (with Romain Graziani). Saint-Denis: Presses Universitaires de Vincennes, 2007.
- In the Fields of Shennong. Cambridge: Needham Research Institute, 2008.
- Food, Sacrifice, and Sagehood in Early China. Cambridge: Cambridge University Press, 2011 (2015)
- 胡司德, 古代中国的动物与灵异. Nanjing: Jiangsu renmin chubanshe, 2016.
- 胡司德, 早期中国的食物、祭祀和圣贤. Hangzhou: Zhejiang daxue chubanshe, 2018.
- Animals Through Chinese History: Earliest times to 1911 (with Dagmar Schaefer and Martina Siebert). Cambridge: Cambridge University Press, 2019.
- Chinese Thought. From Confucius to Cook Ding. London: Penguin, 2019. (Highly commended; Pen Hessell-Tiltman Prize 2020).
- Ways of Heaven. An Introduction to Chinese Thought. New York, Basic Books, 2019.
- Chinees Denken. Over Geschiedenis, filosofie, en samenleving. (Amsterdam: Uitgeverij Nieuwezijds, 2021)
- 中国思想. 从孔夫子到庖丁. 上海: 文艺出版社, 2022.
- Китайская мысль: от Конфуция до повара Дина. Moscow: Alpina, 2022.
