= William Lewis (mineralogist) =

Welsh mineralogist

William James Lewis F.R.S. (10 January 1847 – 16 April 1926) was a Welsh mineralogist.

== Life and career ==
Lewis was born in Llanwyddelan, Montgomeryshire, the second son of clergyman John Lewis, and educated at Llanrwst grammar school and Jesus College, Oxford, where he matriculated in 1865. He obtained first-class degrees in mathematics (1868) and in natural science (1869). After a short spell as a tutor at Cheltenham College (1870–71), he was elected a Fellow of Oriel College, Oxford – a position he retained until his death. He carried out some research at Cambridge University before holding a position at the British Museum from 1875 to 1877; he resigned on the grounds of ill-health. In 1879, he returned to Cambridge to lecture on mineralogy and became Professor of Mineralogy in 1881. His publications were few, but included the standard work A Treatise on Crystallography (1899).

He was elected a Fellow of the Royal Society in 1909. His candidature read: "Professor of Mineralogy in the University of Cambridge since 1881. Fellow of Oriel College, Oxford, since 1872. First Class in Mathematical Moderations and Finals. First Class in the School of Natural Science. Senior University Mathematical Scholarship, 1871. Author of a Treatise on Crystallography (Cambridge University Press, 1899), which has become a recognised and authoritative Text-book for English students. (This work contains a number of original crystallographic investigations; the mathematical treatment of many of the problems and methods discussed is highly original and in many respects more exhaustive than that of other Treatises). Author of various papers on the crystallography of minerals and of artificial products; in particular, a paper 'On Barium Nitrate, which definitely established the Symmetry of that Substance' (Phil Mag, vol iii, 1877); 'An Exhaustive Monograph on the Crystallography of the rare mineral Miargyrite' (Proc Camb Phil Soc, vol iv, 1883); 'Researches on Minerals from the Binnenthal' (Min Mag, vol xiii, 1903); several papers concerning methods of calculation, the determination of possible errors in crystal measurements, the representation of crystals, &c. Prof Lewis has maintained at Cambridge a School of Mineralogy which has earned a high reputation."

Lewis is buried in Holywell Cemetery, Oxford.
