= Magdalena Żernicka-Goetz =

British biologist of Polish descent

Magda Żernicka-Goetz FMedSci
- Żernicka-Goetz in 2026
- Born: Magdalena Żernicka-Goetz; 30 August 1963 (age 63); Warsaw, Poland
- Citizenship: Polish; British
- Education: University of Warsaw (MS, PhD)
- Spouse: David Glover (m. 2000)
- Awards: EMBO Member (2007)
- Scientific career
- Fields: Developmental biology
- Workplaces: University of Warsaw; University of Oxford; University of Cambridge
- Website: zernickagoetzlab.com

Magdalena Żernicka-Goetz (born 30 August 1963) FMedSci is a Polish-British developmental biologist. She serves as Bren Professor of Biology and Biological Engineering at California Institute of Technology (Caltech). She was previously Professor of Mammalian Development and Stem Cell Biology in the Department of Physiology, Development and Neuroscience and Fellow of Sidney Sussex College, Cambridge.

In 2020, she was listed by Prospect as the 10th-greatest thinker for the COVID-19 era, with the magazine writing, "She's been able to grow human embryos in vitro right up to the current 14-day legal limit."

== Education ==
Żernicka-Goetz was born in Warsaw, Poland in 1963. She received her Master of Science degree (summa cum laude) in developmental biology (1988) and her PhD degree in the developmental biology of mammals (1993) from the University of Warsaw, with one year (1990–91) spent at the University of Oxford. She carried out her Ph.D. studies with Andrzej Tarkowski (Warsaw) and Chris Graham (Oxford).

== Career and research ==
After obtaining her Ph.D., Zernicka-Goetz spent two years as a postdoctoral European Molecular Biology Organization (EMBO) fellow with Martin Evans in the Wellcome Trust / Cancer Research UK Institute (now the Gurdon Institute) in Cambridge. In 1997, she started her independent group in the Gurdon Institute where she was a Lister Institute Senior Research Fellow (1997-2002) and subsequently a Wellcome Trust Senior Research Fellow. In 2007, she was awarded a readership and in 2010 a professorship at the University of Cambridge.In 2014, she moved her laboratory to the Department of Physiology, Development and Neuroscience of the University of Cambridge. In 2019, the laboratory moved to the California Institute of Technology (Caltech).

Upon setting up her independent group in 1997, she studied the mechanisms regulating early mammalian development. To do this, she was first to establish RNA interference in mammalian cells to determine cell fate in the mouse embryos. At that time, she also began to trace the origins and destinies of cells in the preimplantation mouse embryo that let her to discover that cell fate specification begins earlier than expected, an unexpected discovery but subsequently validated by her group and others. She found that this development of cell identity begins with heterogeneity in epigenetic regulation at the 4-cell stage that directs a molecular cascade establishing cell polarity, position and fate.

Her recent development of systems permitting both mouse and human embryogenesis during implantation and early post-implantation stages in vitro allowed her to reveal that mouse and human embryo remodelling at implantation is done autonomously by the embryo. She uncovered the mechanism underlying embryo remodelling between the blastocyst and gastrula stages that has led to a change in the textbook model. The demonstration of the self-organisation of human embryos developing in vitro until day 13/14, by Zernicka-Goetz and Ali Brivanlou groups, has provided an unprecedented opportunity to study human development at previously inaccessible and critical stages. This discovery was hailed as the people's choice for the scientific breakthrough of 2016 by Science magazine. The knowledge she gained through her work on how the embryo develops during the blastocyst to gastrula transition, allowed her to mimic these developmental processes with different types of stem cells in vitro. This led her to the pioneering success of constructing embryo-like structures from pluripotent embryonic and multipotent extra-embryonic (trophoblast) stem cells in a 3D scaffold of extra-cellular matrix proteins in vitro. These "synthetic embryos" recapitulate the natural architecture of the embryo and their patterns of gene expression leading to the specification of the germ layers and germ cells. This system allowed her to identify signalling pathways responsible for morphogenesis of stem cells into embryos. Together these models bring outstanding potential for understanding development and for regenerative medicine. In 2023, her team was among several that reported creating the first human embryo models.

Żernicka-Goetz's group have shown that sperm entry induces actomyosin-driven cytoplasmic flows that are predictive of successful development to birth in the mouse. This provides an opportunity to identify quantitatively and non-invasively the healthiest embryos to transfer to would-be-mothers in IVF.

Stimulated by the finding of placental cells with abnormal chromosome complements (aneuploid cells) in her own pregnancy, she began to study the consequence of aneuploidy upon development in a mouse model. Her lab generated an experimental model to find that aneuploid cells arising during embryogenesis in the mouse embryo become eliminated by apoptosis in embryonic but not extra-embryonic tissues. This gives insight into why mosaic aneuploidy identified by chorionic-villus-sampling can be tolerated in human pregnancies.

The potential impact of Żernicka-Goetz's work is now becoming widely recognised through her public engagement.

Her book "The Dance of Life" co-authored with Roger Highfield, describes her scientific and personal journey devoted to understanding the earliest stages of our own life and the critical issue of women in science.

=== Awards and honors ===
Żernicka-Goetz was elected a member of the European Molecular Biology Organization (EMBO) in 2007, a Fellow of the Academy of Medical Sciences (FMedSci), 2013, and a foreign member of Polish Academy of Arts and Sciences in 2016. Other awards and honours include:

- 2023 Ogawa-Yamanaka Stem Cell Prize
- 2023 ESHG Lecture Award
- 2022 Society for Developmental Biology Edwin G. Conklin Medal
- 2022 NOMIS Foundation 'Distinguished Scientist and Scholar' Awardee
- Top ten in Prospect Magazine's 'World's Top 50 Thinkers for the COVID-19 Age'
- The Times 'Science Power List', May 2020
- International Foundation IVI Award for the Best Basic Research in Reproductive Medicine, 2017
- Foreign Member of Polish Academy of Arts and Sciences, elected 2016
- Winner of the People's Vote for Scientific Breakthrough of the year 2016 by Science magazine
- Fellow of the Academy of Medical Sciences 2013
- Anne McLaren Memorial Lecture Award, International Society of Differentiation, 2008
- Member of European Molecular Biology Organisation, elected 2007
- Young Investigator Award, EMBO (2001-2004)
- Wellcome Trust Senior Research Fellowship (2002-2008, 2008–2013, 2013–2018)
- Lister Institute of Preventative Medicine Senior Research Fellowship (1997-2002)
- EMBO Long-term Fellowship for post-doctoral studies at the University of Cambridge (1995-1997)
- Best Ph.D. thesis Award, Polish Ministry of Education, 1994
- Promising Young Scientist Prize, Foundation for Polish Science, 1993

== Personal life ==
Żernicka-Goetz married David Glover in 2000 and has two children.
