= William Hallowes Miller =

Welsh mineralogist and crystallographer

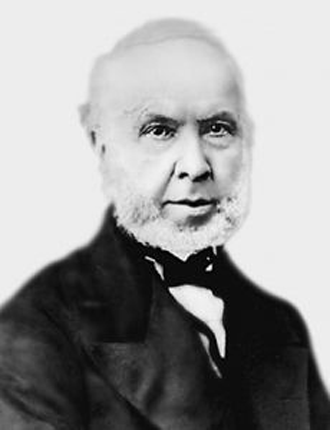
- William Hallowes Miller
- Born: 6 April 1801; Llandovery, Carmarthenshire
- Died: 20 May 1880 (aged 79); Cambridge, Cambridgeshire
- Education: St John's College, Cambridge
- Known for: Miller indices Millerite
- Awards: Royal Medal (1870)
- Scientific career
- Fields: Mineralogy; Crystallography

William Hallowes Miller FRS HFRSE LLD DCL (6 April 1801 – 20 May 1880) was a Welsh mineralogist who laid the foundations for modern crystallography.

Miller indices are named after him, the method having been described in his Treatise on Crystallography (1839). The mineral known as millerite is named after him.

== Life and work ==
Miller was born in 1801 at Velindre near Llandovery, Carmarthenshire, South Wales. He was educated at St John's College, Cambridge, where he graduated in 1826 as fifth wrangler. He became a Fellow there in 1829. For a few years Miller was occupied as a college tutor and during this time he published treatises on hydrostatics and hydrodynamics.

Miller also gave special attention to crystallography, and at 31 years old, on the resignation of William Whewell he succeeded in 1832 to the professorship of mineralogy, a post he held until 1870. Miller's chief work, on Crystallography, was published in 1839. He was elected to the Royal Society in 1838 and received the Royal Medal in 1870, and in the same year was appointed on the International Commission du Metre. He was elected an Honorary Fellow of the Royal Society of Edinburgh in 1874.

Miller was the main thrust in reforming the Parliamentary standards of length and weight, after a fire which in 1834 destroyed the old standards. He was a member of the committee as well as on the Royal Commission which oversaw these new standards.

Miller died in 1880 in Cambridge, England.

== Family ==
In 1844 he married Harriet Susan Minty.

== Selected writings ==
- William Hallowes Miller (1831) The Elements of Hydrostatics and Hydrodynamics
- William Hallowes Miller (1833) An Elementary Treatise on the Differential Calculus
- William Hallowes Miller (1839) A Treatise on Crystallography
- William Phillips, William Hallowes Miller, & Henry James Brooke (1852) An Elementary Introduction to Mineralogy
- William Hallowes Miller (1863) A Tract on Crystallography

In 1852 Miller edited a new edition of H. J. Brooke's Elementary Introduction to Mineralogy.

== See also ==
- Geometrical crystallography before X-rays
