= Brian Reddaway =

English economist and academic (1913–2002)

William Brian Reddaway, CBE, FBA (8 January 1913 – 23 July 2002) was an English economist and academic.

== Biography ==
Born on 8 January 1913, he was the son of the historian William Fiddian Reddaway, who was a fellow of King's College, Cambridge. He attended King's College School, Cambridge, Lydgate House in Hunstanton, and Oundle School before matriculating at King's College, Cambridge, in 1931, with a scholarship. He read mathematics and was placed in the first class for part 1 of the Tripos, before switching to economics in which he came top in his year for part 2. He was taught by Richard Kahn, J. M. Keynes and Gerald Shove.

After graduating in 1934, he worked at the Bank of England, during which time he visited the Soviet Union and produced a book on its financial system. In 1936, he was appointed to a research fellowship in economics at the University of Melbourne, where he worked under L. F. Giblin. He gave evidence to the Commonwealth Arbitration Court in which he advocated for Australian miners' wages to be increased; when this was approved (as the 1937 Basic Wage Judgement), it was informally called the "Reddawage".

Reddaway left the university in 1938 to take up a fellowship at Clare College, Cambridge, where he remained until 2002. He was also appointed a lecturer in the University of Cambridge in 1939. He worked at the Board of Trade during the Second World War (where he developed clothes rationing and worked as a statistician), returning to his academic duties in 1947. He was director of the Department of Applied Economics at Cambridge from 1955 to 1969. He was also promoted to a readership in 1957 and to the Professorship of Political Economy in 1969, in which chair he remained until he retired in 1980.

Reddaway produced studies of government taxation and foreign direct investment policy during the 1960s and 1970s, while also studying development in a range of other countries. He was elected a fellow of the British Academy in 1967, served as the co-editor of The Economic Journal from 1971 to 1976, and was appointed a CBE in 1971 for his services as a member of the National Board for Prices and Incomes.

Reddaway died on 23 July 2002; his wife Barbara Augusta, née Bennett (with whom he had four children), had died in 1996.
