= Holgate School, Barnsley =

Holgate School Sports College

Location
- Shaw Lane; Barnsley, South Yorkshire, S70 6EP; England
- 53.55035°N 1.49463°W

Information
- Type: Voluntary controlled school
- Motto: Fortiter Occupa Portam (Bravely hold the gate) (Note: A pun referring to the founder, Robert Holgate.)
- Established: 1546
- Founder: Robert Holgate, Archbishop of York
- Closed: 2012
- Local authority: Barnsley
- Specialist: Sports
- Department for Education URN: 106657 Tables
- Ofsted: Reports
- Chair of Governors: Kay Thompson
- Head Teacher: Mr Manderson and Mr Haynes
- Gender: Mixed
- Age: 11 to 16
- Enrolment: 952
- Colours: Black, green, silver
- Former name: Holgate Grammar School

Holgate School was a state school in Barnsley, South Yorkshire, England. It was closed in 2012, when it was merged with The Kingstone School to form Horizon Community College. After Holgate closed, it was demolished and the site was turned into a car park for Horizon Community College.

== Admissions ==
The school was awarded the status of Sports College in 2005 for its attention to sporting achievements.

== History ==
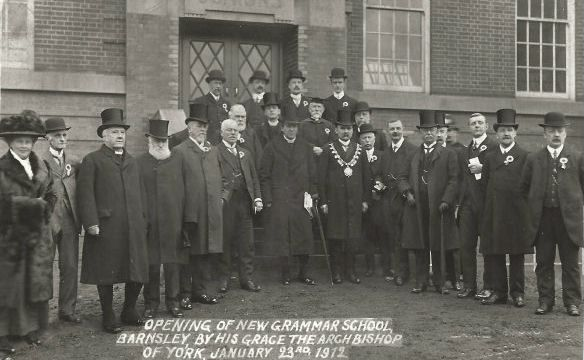
Opening of the new grammar school in 1912

Holgate School was founded in 1546 in Hemsworth by Robert Holgate, the Archbishop of York. In 1888 it was re-organised and moved to Barnsley, South Yorkshire. The grammar school had around 850 boys and moved to its present site in 1912. The school has now closed due to the conjoining of the two Barnsley schools Holgate and Kingstone, coming together to form Horizon Community College.

In January 1981, Michael Parkinson said that Barnsley Grammar School was to his education what myxomatosis was to rabbits.

=== Comprehensive ===
In 1978 it became a fully co-educational comprehensive school, having first admitted its first comprehensive first year intake in 1973. The sixth form went soon after, in 1980.

== Academic performance ==
It got GCSE results under the England average but about average for Barnsley. Like all schools in Barnsley, except the Barnsley Academy, it had no sixth form, with A levels taken at Barnsley College.

== Notable alumni ==
- Sam Nixon - a UK pop singer and television presenter
- Azeem Rafiq, cricketer

=== Barnsley and District Holgate Grammar School ===
- Frank Atkinson CBE, Director from 1970 to 1987 of Beamish Museum, President from 1974 to 1975 of the Museums Association
- Neil Alan Bell, actor
- Denis Barker, former BP executive
- Frederick Woodward Branson, X-ray pioneer
- Sir Stuart Burgess CBE, Chairman from 1995 to 2004 of Finsbury Worldwide Pharmaceutical
- Dave Burland, folk singer
- Donald Chapman, Baron Northfield, Labour MP from 1951 to 1970 for Birmingham Northfield
- Prof Norman Chapman, G. F. Grant Professor of Chemistry from 1956 to 1992 at the University of Hull
- Prof Gordon Cherry, Professor of Urban and Regional Planning from 1976 to 1991 at the University of Birmingham
- Prof John Coyne CBE, Vice Chancellor from 2004 to 2015 of the University of Derby, Chairman since 2017 of British Canoeing
- Prof Donald Davie, poet
- Brian Fieldhouse, Chief Executive from 1990 to 1995 of West Sussex County Council
- Brian Glover, actor
- Michael Green, Controller from 1986 to 1996 of BBC Radio 4, and Chairman from 1990 to 1995 of the Radio Academy
- Jimmy Greenhoff, and his brother Brian, footballers
- Prof Alan Hall FRS, Director of Cell Biology from 2006 to 2015 at the Memorial Sloan Kettering Cancer Center
- Harry Hill, Chief Executive from 1998 to 2007 of Countrywide plc, and founded Rightmove in 2000
- Sir Ronald Holroyd FRS, former ICI executive, President in 1965 of the Society of Chemical Industry
- Flight Sergeant David Horsfall (16 April 1920 - 17 May 1943), who flew on the Dambusters Raid as a Flight Engineer in Lancaster AJ-A with pilot Squadron Leader Dinghy Young DFC; the aircraft was the fourth to bomb the Möhne Dam, but was hit by flak when returning near the Dutch coast at Castricum aan Zee; he is buried at Bergen General Cemetery
- Eric Illsley, Labour MP from 1987 to 2011 for Barnsley Central,
- Tom Johnson, footballer
- John Malcolm, actor
- Martyn Moxon, Director of Pro Cricket at Yorkshire CCC, Yorkshire and England cricketer
- Sir Michael Parkinson, broadcaster and journalist
- Jack Pickering, footballer
- William Prior CBE, Chairman from 1979 to 1984 of the Yorkshire Electricity Board
- Paul Quinn, lead guitarist of Saxon
- William Rayner, novelist
- Neil Rhodes, Chief Constable from 2012 to 2017 of Lincolnshire Police
- Stan Richards, actor best known for playing the role of Seth Armstrong in the soap opera Emmerdale from 1978 to 2004
- Denis Roberts, former Managing Director at the GPO, and Chairman from 1981 to 1985 of the British Philatelic Trust
- Dave Rollitt, rugby union player
- Prof Harry Rothwell, Professor of History from 1945 to 1968 at the University of Southampton
- Rev Canon Geoffrey Shaw, Principal from 1979 to 1989 at Wycliffe Hall, Oxford
- William Taylor CBE, Conservative MP from 1950 to 1964 for Bradford North
- Howard Thackstone, Chief General Manager from 1962 to 1966 of Midland Bank
- Norman West, Labour MEP from 1984 to 1998 for Yorkshire South
- David Woodhall CBE, Chief Executive from 1982 to 1992 of the Commission for New Towns (became English Partnerships)
- George Wright (bishop), Anglican Bishop of Sierra Leone

== Former teachers ==
- Peter Dews (director), theatre director (taught 1952-3)
- Joseph Soar MBE, Organist and Master of the Choristers from 1952 to 1954 at St David's Cathedral (taught Music from 1904 to 1915)

== See also ==
- Archbishop Holgate's School, York
