= Francis Mond Professor of Aeronautical Engineering =

The Francis Mond Professor of Aeronautical Engineering is a professorship in the University of Cambridge. It was established in 1919 as a result of a benefaction from Emile Mond, in memory of his son Francis who had been educated at Peterhouse and was killed in action on 15 May 1918 whilst serving with the RAF on the Western Front.

== Incumbents of the Francis Mond Professorship of Aeronautical Engineering ==
- Bennett Melvill Jones, 1919–1952
- William Austyn Mair, 1952–1983
- Michael Gaster, 1986–1995
- Bill Dawes, 1996–current

== See also ==
- List of Professorships at the University of Cambridge
