= Frank Ruddle =

American cell and developmental biologist (1929–2013)

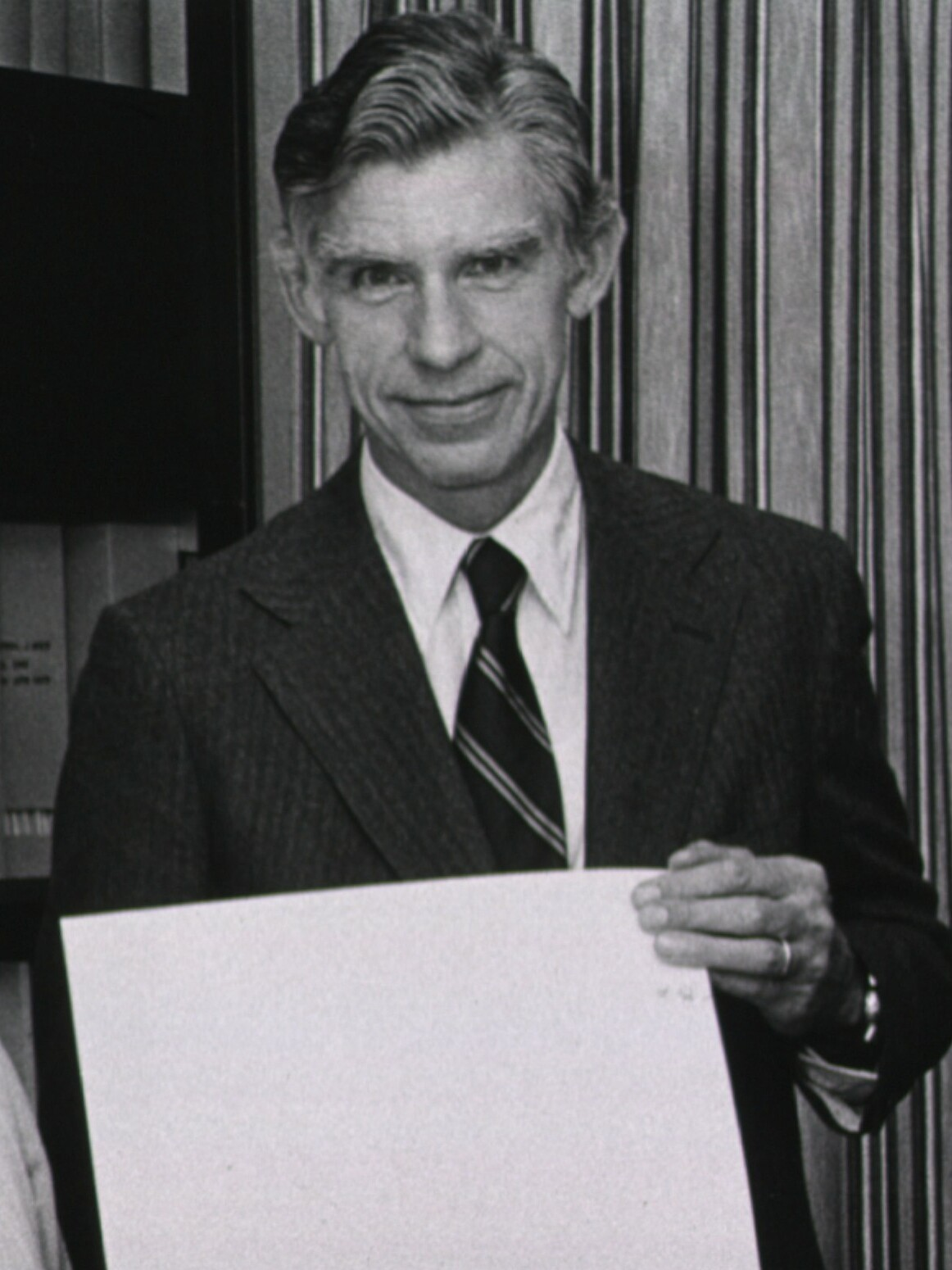
- Frank Ruddle between Ruth Kirschstein and Donald S. Fredrickson in 1978
- Born: Francis Hugh Ruddle; August 9, 1929; West New York, New Jersey
- Died: March 10, 2013 (aged 83); New Haven, Connecticut
- Education: University of California, Berkeley (PhD)
- Awards: Dickson Prize in Medicine (1982); William Allan Award (1984)
- Scientific career
- Institutions: Yale University
- Thesis: Chromosome variation in cell populations (1960)
- Doctoral students: Anne Ferguson-Smith

Francis Hugh Ruddle (1929–2013) was an American cell and developmental biologist who was the Sterling Professor at Yale University. Ruddle was an early visionary of the Human Genome Project and created the first genetically modified mouse. He was a pioneer in both human and mouse genetics.

== Early life and education ==
Ruddle's parents, Thomas H. Ruddle and Mary Henley Rhodda Ruddle, immigrated from the United Kingdom to West New York, New Jersey, where Frank was born on August 19, 1929. He grew up in Mariemont, Ohio, where Ruddle spent a lot of his childhood near the Ohio River. Leaving high school early, Frank became a member of the United States Air Force in 1946 and fought for the country up until the year 1949. With the help of the GI Bill, Frank was able to continue his education at Wayne State University, where he earned both his bachelor's degree and master's degree just two years apart. During the year of 1960, he received his Ph.D. in zoology at the University of California at Berkeley; his dissertation advisor was Morgan Harris.

== Career and projects ==
In 1961, the Yale University's biology department welcomed Ruddle. It was here where he devoted his time to analyzing the genetics of somatic cells and recombination of DNA. His thorough efforts and understanding of human gene mapping is what his research mainly consisted of. Ruddle started his research and experimentation at Yale, and his work in the lab contributed to the development of the Human Genome Project. Wanting to explore his research further to learn more on human disease, Ruddle dedicated his time to transferring human genes into mice. It was during the year of 1981 that Ruddle and his team's research was first published, announcing that they had created the first ever transgenic mouse, by completely changing the arrangement of their genes. The scientists were able to successfully transfer genes from two viruses known as Herpes simplex and SV-40, into new fertilized mouse eggs, which were then inserted into female mice. The outcome consisted of animals that were partially mouse and partially non-mouse. In 1974, Ruddle created the first ever Human Gene Mapping Workshop, and twelve years later, with Victor McKusick, began creating a new journal named Genomics, which the name now represents a whole branch of study. The journal documented the development of many different fields connected to gene mapping.

== Awards and acknowledgements ==
In 1971, Ruddle became the president of the Society for Developmental Biology, and in 1985 he was also the American Society of Human Genetics' president. Two years later, he became the president of the American Society of Cell Biology. Frank was honored many times for his achievements. He was elected to the National Academy of Sciences in 1976, the Institute of Medicine in 1985, and the American Academy of Arts and Sciences in 1977. In 1983, Ruddle received the William Alan Memorial Award by the American Society of Human Genetics. Ruddle also received the Dickson Prize in Medicine. Throughout his entire career, he contributed more than 900 publications to the field.
