= Walter Simon (sinologist) =

German sinologist and librarian

- Born: 10 June 1893; Berlin, Germany
- Died: 22 February 1981 (aged 87); London, England
- Education: University of Berlin
- Scientific career
- Workplaces: SOAS, University of London
- Notable students: Edwin G. Pulleyblank

Ernest Julius Walter Simon, CBE, FBA (10 June 1893 – 22 February 1981) was a German sinologist and librarian.

== Biography ==
Ernest Julius Walter Simon was born in Berlin. He studied at the University of Berlin until fleeing the Nazis in 1934. He settled in London where he spent the rest of his life apart from brief periods in other countries as a visiting professor. He taught Chinese at the School of Oriental and African Studies, University of London from 1947 to 1960. He made important contributions to historical Chinese phonology and Sino-Tibetan linguistics. His Chinese name was Ximen Huade (西門華德, Xīmén Huádé).

== Academic and journalism career ==
- Higher Library Service, Berlin University Library, 1919–35
- Exchange Librarian, National Library of Peking, 1932–33
- Lecturer in Chinese, University of Berlin, 1926–32; Extraordinary Professor of Chinese, University of Berlin, 1932–34
- Lecturer, School of Oriental and African Studies, 1936; Reader in Chinese, University of London, 1938; Professor of Chinese, University of London, 1947–60, Emeritus Professor, 1960
- Visiting Professor: University of Toronto, 1961–62; Australian National University, Canberra, 1962; Tokyo, Canberra and Melbourne, 1970
- Editor, Asia Major, 1964–75
- Honorary Fellow, School of Oriental and African Studies, University of London
- Honorary Vice-President, Royal Asiatic Society, 1976–1981 (Gold Medal, 1977)

He was named a Commander of the Order of the British Empire (CBE) in 1961.

== Publications on Chinese linguistics ==
- (in German) Zur Rekonstruktion der altchinesischen Endkonsonanten, 2 Parts, 1928–29
- (in German) Tibetisch-chinesische Wortgleichungen: Ein Versuch, W. de Gruyter & Co., Berlin 1930.
- Chinese Sentence Series, 3 volumes, 1942–44
- The New Official Chinese Latin Script Gwoyeu Romatzyh: Tables, Rules, Illustrative Examples, Probsthain, London 1942.
- Chinese National Language (Gwoyeu) Reader and Guide to Conversation, 1943 (2nd edn 1954, reprinted 1972).
- 1200 Chinese Basic Characters, 1944 (4th repr. 1975)
- How to Study and Write Chinese Characters, 1944 (3rd reprint 1975)
- Structure Drill through Speech Patterns, I. Structure Drill in Chinese, 1945 (2nd edn 1959, reprinted 1975)
- A Beginners' Chinese-English Dictionary of the National Language (Gwoyeu) / Chujyi Jong-Ing Gwoyeu Tzyhdean 《初級中英國語字典》, Lund Humphries & Co. Ltd., London 1947. (4th edn 1975)

== Publications on Tibetan linguistics ==
- 1941. "Certain Tibetan suffixes and their combinations." Harvard Journal of Asiatic Studies 5: 372–391. DOI: 10.2307/2717917
- 1942. "Tibetan dang, cing, kyin, yin and 'am". Bulletin of the School of Oriental and African Studies 10, 1942. 954–975.
- 1949. "The range of sound alternation in Tibetan word families." Asia Major (New Series) 1:1–15
- 1955. "A Note on Tibetan Bon." Asia Major (New Series) 5.1: 5–8.
- 1956. "Tibetan "so" and Chinese "ya" 'Tooth'" Bulletin of the School of Oriental and African Studies 18.3 (1956): 512–513.
- 1957. "Tibetan gseb and cognate words." Bulletin of the School of Oriental and African Studies 20 (1957): 523–32
- 1962. "Tibetan par, dpar, spar, and cognate words." Bulletin of the School of Oriental and African Studies 25 (1962): 720–80.
- 1964. "Tibetan Lexicography and Etymological Research." Transactions of the Philological Society (1964): 85–107.
- 1966. "Tibetan nyin-rans and tho-rangs." Asia Major (New Series) 12, 1966. 179–84.
- 1967. "The Tibetan particle re." Bulletin of the School of Oriental and African Studies 30 (1967): 117–26.
- 1968. "Tibetan re in its wider context." Bulletin of the School of Oriental and African Studies 31 (1968): 555–62.
- 1969. "Cognates of Tibetan rnangs-pa ('entire, complete')." Academica Sinica: Bulletin of the Institute of History and Philology 39 (1969): 287–9.
- 1970. "Some suggestions toward a Romanization of modern Tibetan (Lhasa dialect)." Roman Jakobson and Shigeo Kawamoto, eds. Studies in General and Oriental Linguistics. Tokyo: TEC, 535–539.
- 1971. "Tibetan 'fifteen' and 'eighteen'." Études Tibétaines: dédiées à la mémoire de Marcelle Lalou. Paris: Libraire d'Amérique et d'Orient, 1971.
- 1975. "Iotization and palatalization in classical Tibetan." Bulletin of the School of Oriental and African Studies 38: 611–615.
- 1977. "Alternation of Final Vowel with Final Dental Nasal or Plosive in Tibetan." Bulletin of the School of Oriental and African Studies 40.1 (1977): 51–57.
- 1979. "Tibetan stes, stes-te, etc. and some of the Sanskrit correspondences." Bulletin of the School of Oriental and African Studies 42 (1979): 334–6.
- 1980. "Some Tibetan Etymologies of Semantic Interest." Bulletin of the School of Oriental and African Studies 43.1 (1980): 132–136.
