= William Rayner =

English writer (1929–2006)

William Rayner (1 January 1929 – 2006) was an English writer of novels for adults and children. After working as a teacher and lecturer, Rayner published a number of books, often historical fiction, including the unfinished "Devil's Picture-Book" trilogy. His two YA novels, Stag Boy and Big Mister incorporated fantasy elements.

== Biography ==
Rayner was born on the first day of 1929, in Barnsley, Yorkshire, to Thomas (a civil servant) and Lily (née Fisher) Rayner. He was educated at Holgate Grammar School in Barnsley, and Wadham College, Oxford, earning a B.A. (honours) in English in 1952, after which he made a living as a teacher and lecturer.

He married Pamela Ross in 1953. From 1955 to 1960, Rayner, his wife, and their first son lived in what was then known as Southern Rhodesia (now Zimbabwe). One result of his time there is his non-fiction book, The Tribe and its Successors: An Account of African Traditional Life and European Settlement in Southern Rhodesia, which was published in 1962 by Faber & Faber in the UK and Frederick A. Praeger in the USA.

Rayner's first novel, The Reapers, came out in 1961. More followed throughout the 1960s and 1970s, including two Young adult fiction novels, Stag Boy (1972) and Big Mister (1974), after which Rayner returned to mostly historical fiction for adults, often set in the American West.

His last two novels, Wheels of Fortune (1979) and Knave of Swords (1980), were intended to be followed by a third, to complete "The Devil's Picture-Book" trilogy, set at the end of the 18th century, addressing themes arising from the Industrial Revolution.

Rayner died in Somerset, England in 2006. His wife (with whom he had three sons) died in 2013.

== Bibliography ==
- The Reapers (1961)
- The Barebones (1962)
- The Tribe and its Successors: An Account of African Traditional Life and European Settlement in Southern Rhodesia (1962)
- The Last Days (1969)
- The Knifeman: The Last Journal of Judas Iscariot (1969)
- The World Turned Upside-Down (1970) – in paperback by Sphere Books in 1971 as Redcoat
- The Bloody Affray at Riverside Drive (1972) – in the USA in 1973 as Seth & Belle & Mr Quarles and Me: The Bloody Affray at Lakeside Drive
- Stag Boy (1972)
- Big Mister (1974)
- A Weekend with Captain Jack (1975)
- The Trail to Bear Paw Mountain (1976)
- The Day of Chaminuka (1976)
- Eating the Big Fish (1977) – in the USA in 1978 as Interface Assignment
- Wheels of Fortune (1979)
- Chief Joseph and His People (1979) – juvenile biography of Chief Joseph
- Knave of Swords (1980)
