= Horizon Community College =

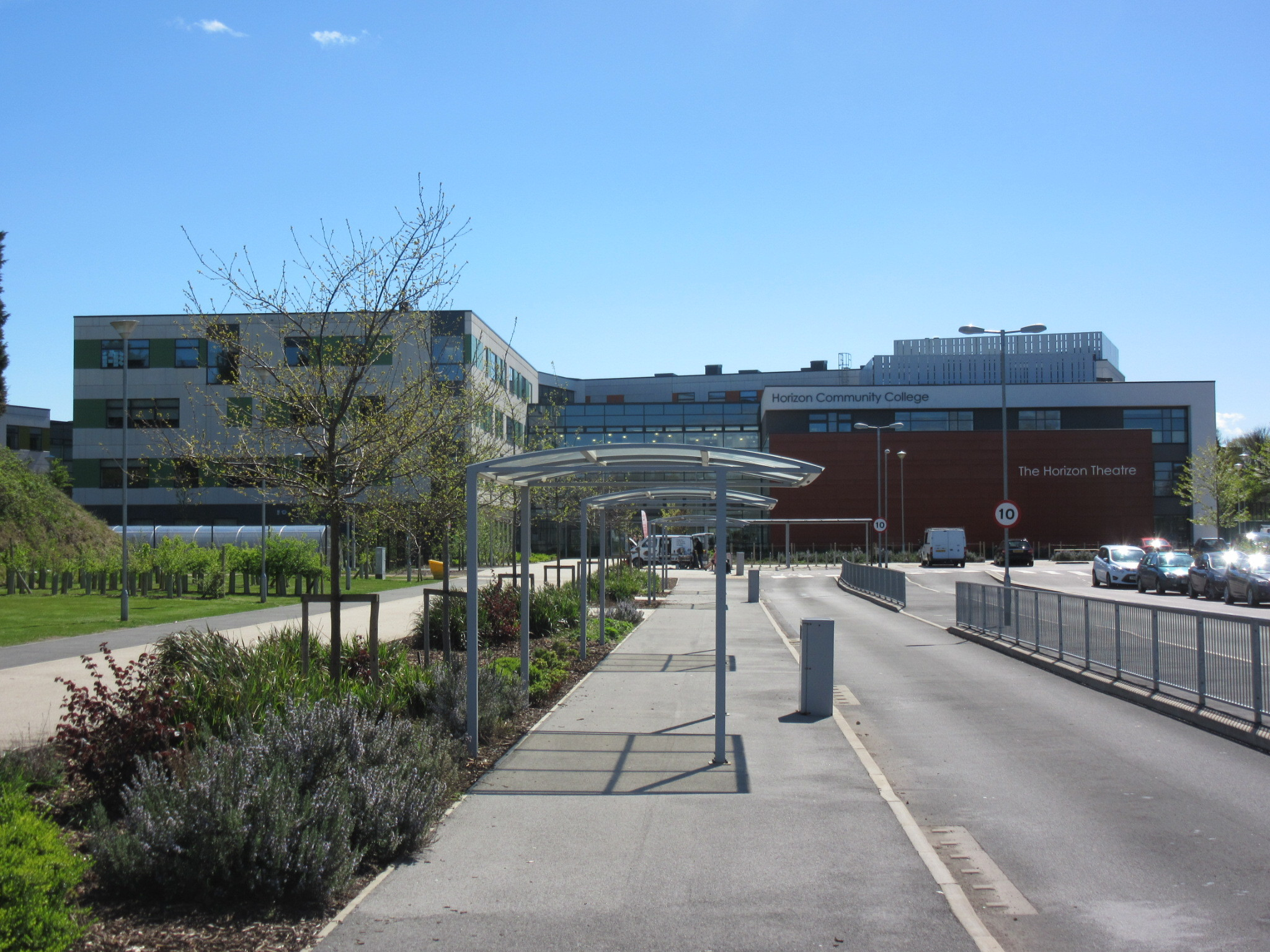

Location
- Dodworth Road; Barnsley, South Yorkshire, S70 6PD; England
- Coordinates: 53.5506°N 1.5036°W

Information
- Type: Academy
- Established: 2012
- Local authority: Barnsley
- Trust: Hoyland Common Academy Trust
- Department for Education URN: 146455 Tables
- Ofsted: Reports
- Executive Principal: Nicholas Bowen
- Principal: Claire Huddart
- Gender: Co-educational
- Age: 11 to 16
- Enrolment: 1991 as of June 2022
- Colours: Green and Yellow
- Website: www.horizoncc.co.uk

Horizon Community College is a co-educational secondary school located in Barnsley, South Yorkshire, England, on the A628.

The school was formed in 2012 from a merger of Holgate School and The Kingstone School. The school relocated to a new campus with facilities for leisure, cultural activities and adult learning to be used by the local community. There is capacity, if needs be, to teach groups as large as 65, using classrooms with removable walls.

Anne, Princess Royal visited the School on 4 July 2014 where she met the then local MP (Dan Jarvis), the executive principal (Nicholas Bowen) and a small selection of pupils.

Previously a voluntary aided school administered by Barnsley Metropolitan Borough Council, in June 2019 Horizon Community College converted to academy status. The school is now sponsored by the Hoyland Common Academy Trust. As of 2020, Nicholas Bowen is now the Executive Principal, Vice Chair of Barnsley College, and the Chair of the Barnsley Schools Alliance, working two days a week to support school improvement across the borough.
