= Natural Sciences Tripos =

Teaching framework at Cambridge University

- Type: Bachelor of Arts (BA) degree; Master of Science (MSci) degree
- Skills tested: Natural science
- Year started: 1851
- Duration: 3 (BA) or 4 (BA + MSci) years
- Regions: University of Cambridge language
- based on: Tripos
- Website: www.natsci.tripos.cam.ac.uk

The Natural Sciences Tripos is the framework within which most of the science at the University of Cambridge is taught. The tripos includes a wide range of natural sciences from physics, astronomy, and geoscience, to chemistry and biology, which are taught alongside the history and philosophy of science. The tripos covers several courses which form the University of Cambridge system of Tripos. It is known for its broad range of study in the first year, in which students cannot study just one discipline, but instead must choose three courses in different areas of the natural sciences and one in mathematics. As is traditional at Cambridge, the degree awarded after Part II (three years of study) is a Bachelor of Arts (BA). A Master of Natural Sciences degree (MSci) is available to those who take the optional Part III (one further year). It was started in the 19th century.

== Teaching ==
Teaching is carried out by 16 different departments. Subjects offered in Part IA in 2024 are Biology of Cells, Chemistry, Evolution and Behaviour, Earth Sciences, Materials Science, Physics, Physiology of Organisms, and three Mathematics options; students must take three experimental subjects and one mathematics course. There are three options for the compulsory mathematics element in IA: "Mathematics A", "Mathematics B" and "Mathematical Biology". From 2020, Computer Science was removed as an option in the natural sciences course.

Students specialize further in the second year (Part IB) of their Tripos, taking three subjects from a choice of twenty, and completely in their third year (Part II) in, for example, genetics or astrophysics, although general third year courses do exist – Biomedical and Biological Sciences for biologists and Physical Sciences for chemists, physicists, etc. Fourth year options (Part III) are available in a number of subjects, and usually have an entry requirement of obtaining a 2:1 or a First in second year Tripos Examinations, and is applied for before the commencement of the third year. As of 2025, options with an available Part III option are: Astrophysics, Biochemistry, Chemistry, Earth Sciences, Materials Science, Experimental and Theoretical Physics, History and Philosophy of Science, Systems Biology and Quantitative Climate and Environmental Science (QCES). As of 2025 the tripos is delivered by many different departments including:

- The Department of Chemistry
- The Department of Genetics
- The Department of Physics
- The Institute of Astronomy
- The Department of Biochemistry
- The Department of Pharmacology
- The Department of Pathology
- The Department of Plant Sciences
- The Department of Physiology, Development and Neuroscience
- The Department of Zoology
- The Department of Psychology
- The Department of Earth Sciences
- The Department of Materials Science and Metallurgy
- The Department of History and Philosophy of Science

== Motivation ==
The University of Cambridge believes that their course's generalisation, rather than specialisation, gives their students an advantage. First, it allows students to experience subjects at university level before specialising. Second, many modern sciences exist at the boundaries of traditional disciplines, for example, applying methods from a different discipline. Third, this structure allows other scientific subjects, such as Mathematics (traditionally a very strong subject at Cambridge), Medicine and the History and Philosophy of Science, (and previously Computer sciences before it had been removed for 2020 entry) to link with the Natural Sciences Tripos so that once, say, the two-year Part I of the Medical Sciences tripos has been completed, one can specialise in another biological science in Part II during one's third year, and still come out with a science degree specialised enough to move into postgraduate studies, such as a PhD.

== Student enrolment ==
As a result of this structure, the Natural Sciences Tripos has by far the greatest number of students of any Tripos. Undergraduates who are reading for the Natural Sciences Tripos in order to gain their degrees are colloquially known in University slang as 'NatScis (pronounced "Nat-Ski's"), being broadly nicknamed physical science ('phys') or biological science ('bio') NatScis, according to their course choices (although many students choose both physical and biological options in their first year.) The split tends to be about 50:50 between the physical and biological sciences.

In 2026, 2644 students applied and 576 were admitted to the Natural Sciences Tripos.

In order to be accepted to study on the Natural Sciences course, students must sit the ESAT (Engineering and Science Admissions Test) exam in the year of their application. This is a test required by Cambridge to assess their candidates.
