= Sir Patrick Sheehy Professor of International Relations =

Professorship at the University of Cambridge

The Sir Patrick Sheehy Professor of International Relations is a professorship at the University of Cambridge, named after Patrick Sheehy, former chairman of British-American Tobacco. It was established in 1996 amid criticism concerning the University of Cambridge acceptance of funding from the tobacco industry.

== List of professors ==
- 1997–2004 James B.L. Mayall, during which time the professorship was assigned to the Faculty of History
- 2004–2016 Christopher J. Hill, during which time the professorship was assigned to the Centre of International Studies
- 2017- Jason Sharman, formerly Professor of Political Science at Griffith University, Brisbane, Australia.
