= Herchel Smith =

British scientist

- Born: May 6, 1925; Plymouth, Devon, England
- Died: December 20, 2001 (aged 76); West Chester, Pennsylvania, US
- Education: Emmanuel College, Cambridge
- Known for: Oral birth-control pill
- Scientific career
- Workplaces: University of Oxford; University of Manchester
- Doctoral advisor: Alexander Robertus Todd

Herchel Smith (May 6, 1925 – December 20, 2001) was an Anglo-American organic chemist. His discoveries include the key inventions underlying oral and injectable contraceptives. In later life, he was a major benefactor to university science. In England, the University of Cambridge and Queen Mary University of London have been the major beneficiaries; and in the US, Harvard University, the University of Pennsylvania, and Williams College. During his lifetime and after his death, Smith donated over US$200 million to Cambridge and US$100 million to Harvard, including endowments to expand student exchange between the two universities through fellowships.

His early education in Plymouth and Exeter (in the South West of England) led him in 1942 to Emmanuel College, Cambridge, where he studied the Natural Sciences Tripos. Smith had research interests in organic chemistry that were stimulated by Professor Lord Todd.

His independent research started in Oxford University (1952–1956) but reached its full fruition whilst he was a lecturer in organic chemistry at the University of Manchester.

In 1961, a three-month visit to the research laboratories of Wyeth Pharmaceuticals in Pennsylvania, evolved into a permanent position where he continued to research steroid chemistry.

Herchel Smith's work on new methods for the total synthesis of steroids led to the development of commercially feasible methods for the industrial production of estrone, equilin (an important constituent of treatments for post-menopausal syndrome), 19-nor-testosterone, and Norgestrel (a novel progestogen). Norgestrel was found to be a potent contraceptive and formed the basis for a range of contraceptive drugs both oral and injectable.

He retired in 1973 and started a new career as a philanthropist in which he returned to the academic community the major part of the substantial fortune that had accrued from his patent and licensing fees. One of his projects was funding Cambridge students to study postgraduate courses at Harvard, and Harvard students to study at Cambridge.

== Personal life ==
Smith had a wife, Sheila, who pre-deceased him, and a son, Marcus.
