= Department of Genetics, University of Cambridge =

- Purpose: Research and teaching in Genetics
- Head of Department: Steve Russell
- Parent organization: University of Cambridge
- Website: www.gen.cam.ac.uk

The Department of Genetics is a department of the University of Cambridge that conducts research and teaching in genetics.

== Research ==
As of 2017, the department has 83 researchers over 27 research groups, studying functional genomics, systems biology, developmental biology, cell biology, epigenetic inheritance, microbial genetics and evolution and population genetics.

== Notable academic staff ==
- Anne Ferguson-Smith FRS FMedSci, Arthur Balfour Professor of Genetics, formerly Head of the Department
- Richard Durbin FRS, Honorary Professor of Computational genomics, Senior Group Leader at the Wellcome Trust Sanger Institute
- Julie Ahringer FMedSci, Professor of Genetics and Genomics, Wellcome Trust Senior Research Fellow, and Director of the Gurdon Institute
- David Glover FRS FRSE, Wellcome Investigator in the Department of Genetics, formerly Balfour Professor of Genetics

As of 2017, the department also has 50-65 graduate students and about 30 Part II Tripos undergraduate students.

== Emeritus and alumni ==
Notable alumni of the department include:

- Reginald Punnett FRS, inventor of the Punnett Square
- Michael Ashburner FRS, gene ontologist and co-founder of the European Bioinformatics Institute (EBI)
- Ronald Fisher, statistical geneticist, who has been described as “a genius who almost single-handedly created the foundations for modern statistical science”.
