= Northumberland Strategic Partnership =

The Northumberland Strategic Partnership was the Local Strategic Partnership for the county of Northumberland created in 1997. As of 2015 the partnership is not active.
