= Marshall Library of Economics =

Library in Cambridge, England

Coordinates: 52.200789°N 0.108985°E

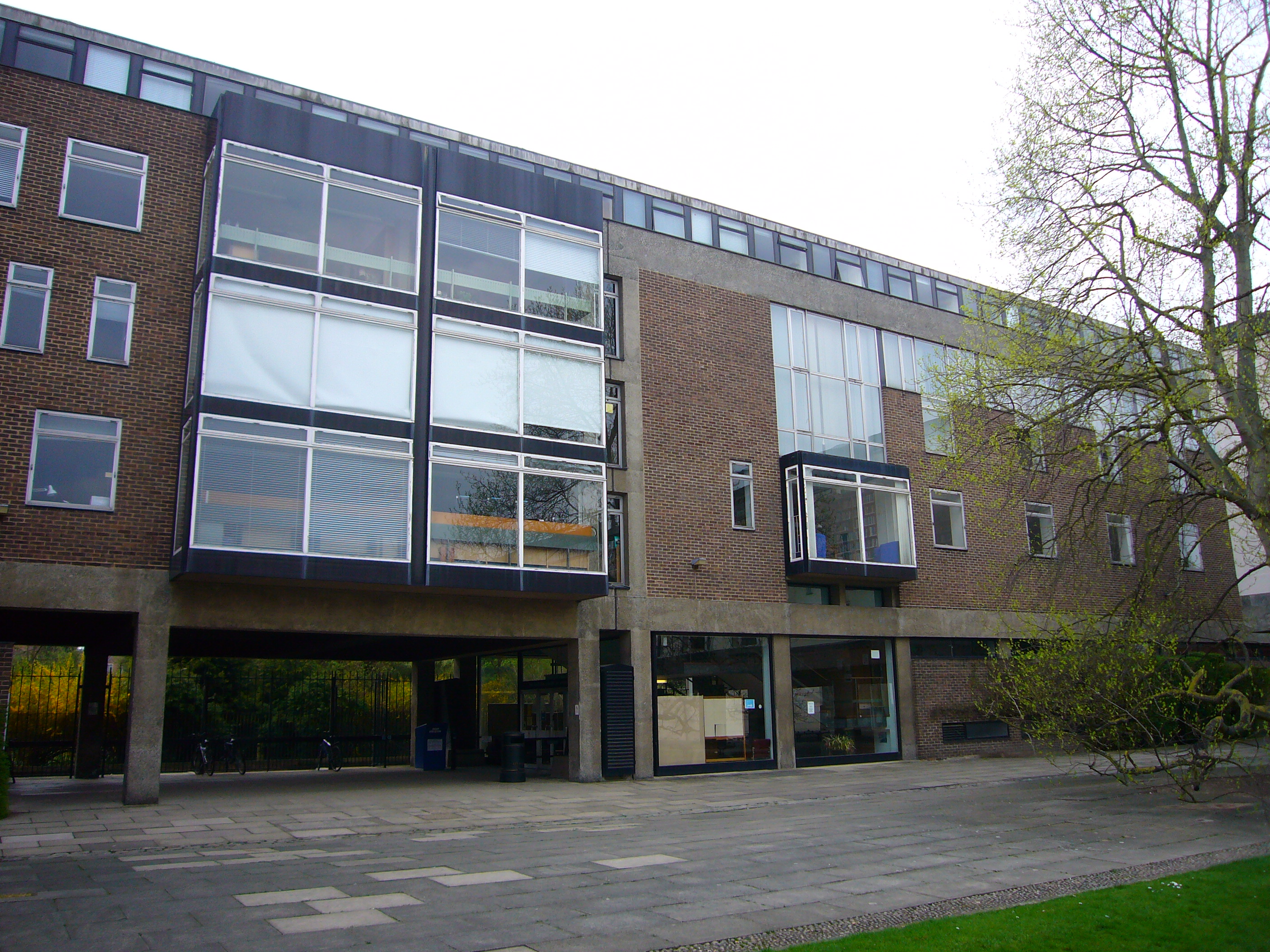
The Marshall Library of Economics.

The Marshall Library of Economics is a library of the University of Cambridge, England.

== History ==
The library is the outgrowth of a Moral Sciences Library begun in 1885 by Professor Alfred Marshall and Professor Henry Sidgwick, consisting largely of their own books and housed in the Selwyn Divinity School, opposite St John's College. Since 2012 the library has also held books of the Centre of Development Studies, which had been housed in the Mill Lane Library.

Upon his death in 1924, Professor Marshall bequeathed much of his personal library to Cambridge. In his honour, the expanded collection was named "The Marshall Library of Economics", and moved to larger quarters in the former Balfour Laboratory in Downing Place. In 1935, it took over the former Squire Law Library, adjoining the Geological Museum, and in the early 1960s relocated once again to its present home on the Sidgwick Site. The Marshall Library is housed within the Austin Robinson Building (which is home to the Faculty of Economics), designed by Hugh Casson.

== Collections ==
The library covers Economics, Applied Economics, and Development Studies. The collection consists of approximately 75,000 monographs, 25,000 volumes of periodicals and serials, 30 current periodical titles (print). The historic collection includes about 4,000 rare books, and various archival materials of economists (e.g. John Neville Keynes, Arthur Pigou, Austin Robinson).
