= Go Wansbeck =

Agency in Northumberland, England, 2007–2013

Go Wansbeck (GOW) was an Enterprise Agency (Local Enterprise Growth Initiative) in Wansbeck, Northumberland, England. The agency was founded in 2007, to bring new enterprise to the area, which had suffered high unemployment for some time.

In 2013, Go Wansbeck closed down after over five years of helping local businesses.

== Statistics ==
Go Wansbeck brought over £16 million into the area and helped over 300 start-ups.
