= Oliver Linton =

British professor of Political Economy and Econometrics

- Born: Oliver Bruce Linton

Academic background
- Education: London School of Economics (BSc, MSc); University of California, Berkeley (PhD)

Academic work
- Institutions: Cambridge University
- Doctoral students: Mototsugu Shintani
- Website: Information at IDEAS / RePEc

Oliver Bruce Linton is a British econometrician and professor of political economy at the University of Cambridge, where he is a Fellow of Trinity College, Cambridge. His research is in econometric theory and its applications, particularly nonparametric and semiparametric methods, time-series econometrics and financial econometrics.

Linton is a Fellow of the British Academy, the Econometric Society and the Institute of Mathematical Statistics. He received a Humboldt Research Award in 2015 and served as president of the Society for Financial Econometrics from 2021 to 2023.

== Education and academic career ==
Linton received a BSc in mathematics and an MSc in econometrics and mathematical economics from the London School of Economics before completing his PhD in economics at the University of California, Berkeley in 1991. From 1991 to 1993 he was a Junior Research Fellow at Nuffield College, Oxford.

He joined Yale University as an assistant professor in 1993, becoming an associate professor in 1997 and a full professor in 1998.

In 1999 Linton became Professor of Econometrics at the London School of Economics, a position he held until 2011. He then joined the University of Cambridge as Professor of Political Economy and became a Fellow of Trinity College, Cambridge.

== Professional activities and honours ==
Linton was elected a Fellow of the Econometric Society and the Institute of Mathematical Statistics in 2007, and of the British Academy in 2008. In 2015 he received a Humboldt Research Award from the Alexander von Humboldt Foundation.

Linton has held several editorial positions in econometrics. He served as a co-editor of Econometric Theory from 2000 to 2014, The Econometrics Journal from 2007 to 2014, and the Journal of Econometrics from 2014 to 2019. He was also an associate editor of Econometrica from 2003 to 2015 and of the Journal of the American Statistical Association from 2004 to 2007, and served on the editorial board of The Review of Economic Studies from 1999 to 2006.

Linton received a European Research Council Advanced Grant of €1.2 million for the project Nonparametric and Semiparametric Methods in Economics and Finance, which ran from 2009 to 2014.

He was president of the Society for Financial Econometrics from 2021 to 2023. He also served on the lead expert group for the UK Government's Foresight project on computer-based trading and gave evidence to the Parliamentary Commission on Banking Standards in November 2012.

== Notable publications ==
=== Chapters in books ===
- Linton, Oliver; Anand, Sudhir; Harris, Christopher (2009), "On ultrapoverty", in Kanbur, Ravi; Basu, Kaushik (eds.), Arguments for a better world: essays in honor of Amartya Sen | Volume I: Ethics, welfare, and measurement, Oxford New York: Oxford University Press, pp. 311–336, ISBN 9780199239115.
- Linton, Oliver; Park, Sujin (2012), "Realized volatility: theory and application", in Bauwens, Luc; Hafner, Christian; Laurent, Sébastien (eds.), Handbook of volatility models and their applications, Hoboken, New Jersey: Wiley, pp. 319–346, ISBN 9780470872512.

=== Journal articles ===
- Linton, Oliver; Battey, Heather (January 2014). "Nonparametric estimation of multivariate elliptic densities via finite mixture sieves". Journal of Multivariate Analysis. 123: 43–67. doi:10.1016/j.jmva.2013.08.013. hdl:10044/1/41334.
- Linton, Oliver; Gozalo, Pedro (August 2014). "Testing conditional independence restrictions". Econometric Reviews. 33 (5–6): 523–552. doi:10.1080/07474938.2013.825135. S2CID 120696522.
- Linton, Oliver; Hafner, Christian M. (27 April 2015). "An almost closed form estimator for the EGARCH model" (PDF). Social Science Research Network. doi:10.2139/ssrn.2139516. S2CID 17088549. SSRN 2139516.

=== Papers ===
- Linton, Oliver; Brugler, James (3 February 2014). "Single stock circuit breakers on the London Stock Exchange: do they improve subsequent market quality?". Centre for Microdata Methods and Practice (cemmap) in association with the Economic and Social Research Council. doi:10.1920/wp.cem.2014.0714 (inactive 1 July 2025). hdl:10419/97379. CWP07/14. Pdf.
- Linton, Oliver; Han, Heejoon; Oka, Tatsushi; Whang, Yoon-Jae (20 February 2014). "The cross-quantilogram: measuring quantile dependence and testing directional predictability between time series". Centre for Microdata Methods and Practice (cemmap) in association with the Economic and Social Research Council. arXiv:1402.1937. doi:10.1920/wp.cem.2014.0614 (inactive 12 July 2025). CWP06/14. Pdf.
- Linton, Oliver; Hong, Seok Young; Zhang, Hui Jun (20 June 2014). "Multivariate variance ratio statistics". Centre for Microdata Methods and Practice (cemmap) in association with the Economic and Social Research Council. doi:10.1920/wp.cem.2014.2914 (inactive 1 July 2025). CWP29/14. Pdf.
- Linton, Oliver; Hong, Seok Young; Zhang, Hui Jun (23 March 2015). "An investigation into multivariate variance ratio statistics and their application to stock market predictability". Centre for Microdata Methods and Practice (cemmap) in association with the Economic and Social Research Council. doi:10.1920/wp.cem.2015.1315 (inactive 1 July 2025). hdl:10419/130030. CWP13/15. Pdf.
