= Edward J. Bles =

British zoologist and author

Edward Jeremiah Bles FRSE (1864-1926) was a British zoologist and author.

== Life ==
He was born in Salford near Manchester.

He was educated at Owens College in Manchester and then the University of London where he graduated BSc.

In 1892, he was appointed Junior Demonstrator in Zoology at Owens College. In 1893-4, he directed the Marine Biological Association station at Plymouth. He returned to university to study at King's College, Cambridge receiving first a BA and then an MA (1907). He continued to be Assistant Professor in Natural History at Glasgow University. He served for some time at the Zoological Station at Trieste in Italy.

In 1904, he was elected a Fellow of the Royal Society of Edinburgh. In the same year he was awarded a DSc from London University.

On his death on 3 May 1926 he bequeathed Cambridge University his scientific apparatus and sufficient funds to create two professorships: one in embryology and one in biophysics.
