= The Kingstone School =

The Kingstone School (Closed Down )
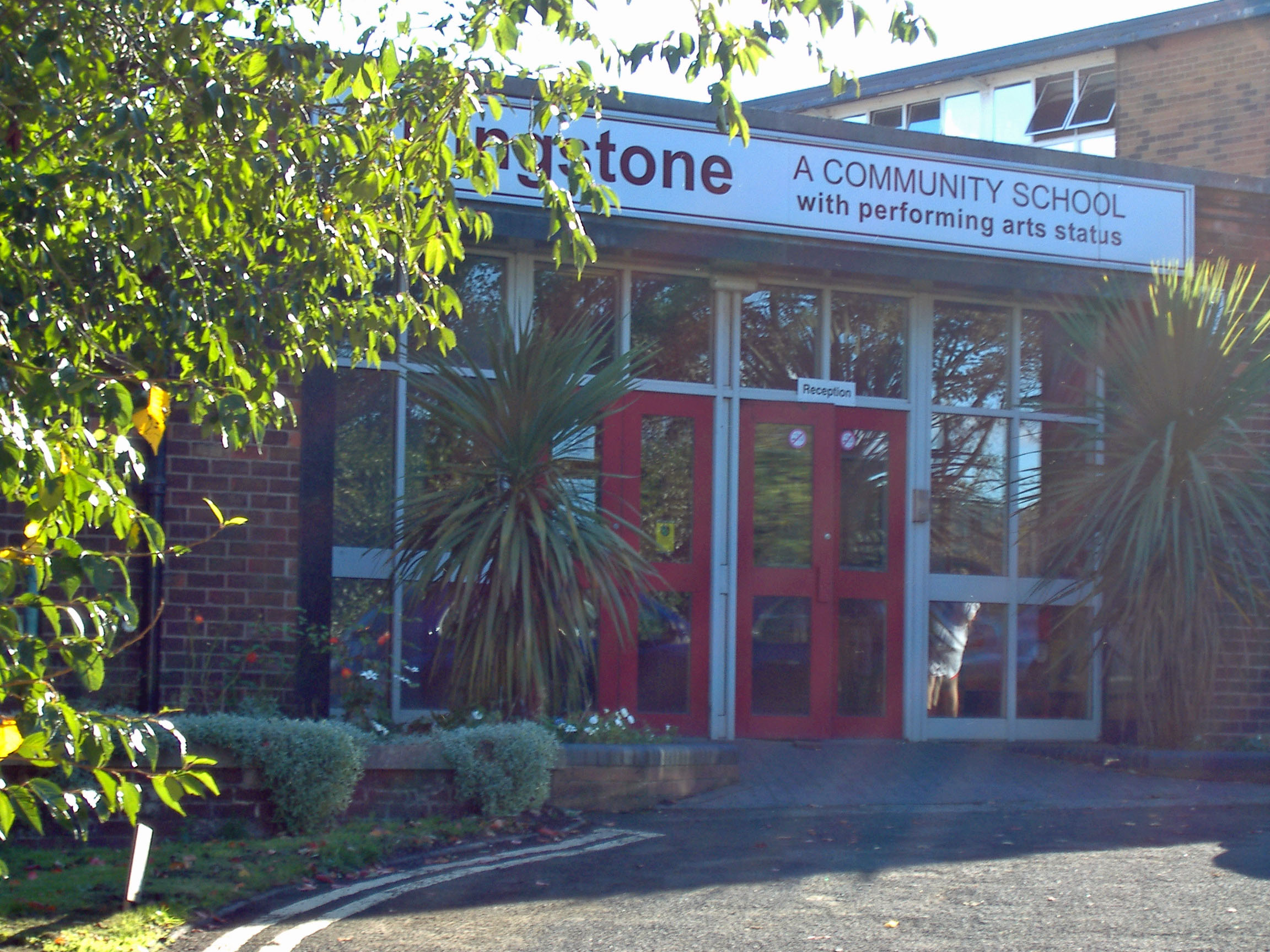

Location
- Broadway; Barnsley, South Yorkshire, S70 6RB; England; 53.54523°N 1.50159°W

Information
- Type: Comprehensive
- Established: 1978
- Closed: 2012
- Local authority: Barnsley
- Specialist: Performing Arts College
- Gender: Co-educational
- Age: 11 to 16
- Colours: White & Burgundy & Grey
- Website: http://www.thekingstoneschool.co.uk

Kingstone School was a secondary school located in the Metropolitan Borough of Barnsley, South Yorkshire, England. Founded in 1987, the school provided secondary education to pupils aged 11–16. It had a capacity of approximately 1,500, making it one of the largest schools in the area.

In September 1987, Kingstone was formed by the amalgamation of Broadway Grammar School with adjacent Charter Comprehensive during the restructure of the British education system. In September 2012 it amalgamated with Holgate School to form Horizon Community College based at a new site on Dodworth road. The Kingstone School buildings were demolished in late 2012 to make way for a housing development.

== Management ==
The Head Teacher from 2003 to 2011 was Matthew Milburn, who succeeded the original head of the school David J. Richards in September 2003.

The acting joint heads were I Ellam and P Gallagher for 2011–12, the final academic year of the school's existence, until it merged with Holgate and became Horizon Community College

== Academic performance ==
Kingstone achieved consistently good GCSE results for the area, with 60% of the class of 2000–2007 achieving GCSE grades A*–C.

The school was awarded Performing Arts status by Ofsted.

== School tie ==
There were 6 variants of the school tie: five of the same design with a different coloured stripe, and one "Year 11 tie" which was mandatory for Year 11 (final year) students.

The colours are rotated each year so that pupils need not buy more than one tie. In 2011–12:

- Year 7: White
- Year 8: Green
- Year 9: Black
- Year 10: Blue
- Year 11: Yellow/ Grey (with school Coat of Arms) with prefect badge if achieved

== Performing arts ==
Kingstone School presented performances of Grease (musical), Smike, We Will Rock You, Little Shop of Horrors, High School Musical and Oliver!.

== Kingstone Concert Band ==
Kingstone School was home to the Kingstone Concert Band (formerly Kingstone School Concert Band), which played at Blackpool Opera House, Disneyland Paris, Efteling theme park in the Netherlands, and which in April 2006 toured Barcelona promoting Concert bands in the area, visiting local deprived schools and entertaining them with music, the band also visited the theme park, PortAventura Park in Salou, Spain. In April 2007 the band visited Florence, Italy.

== Sport ==
A community sports centre opened on the school site in October 2006. It had a multifunctional purpose and was also used as an area for the schools physical education activities.

The Sport Hall ( Closed Down )
