= Edwin G. Pulleyblank =

Canadian sinologist and linguist (1922–2013)

Edwin G. Pulleyblank FRSC
- Born: August 7, 1922; Calgary, Alberta, Canada
- Died: April 13, 2013 (aged 90); Vancouver, British Columbia, Canada
- Spouses: Winona Relyea (m. 1946; died 1976) Pan Yihong (m. 2002)
- Children: 3

Academic background
- Education: University of Alberta (B.A.); University of Cambridge (M.A.); SOAS, University of London (Ph.D.)
- Doctoral advisor: Walter Simon

Academic work
- Discipline: Chinese linguistics, history
- Institutions: SOAS, University of London; Cambridge University; University of British Columbia

Chinese name
- Chinese: 蒲立本
Transcriptions
Standard Mandarin
- Hanyu Pinyin: Pú Lìběn
- Gwoyeu Romatzyh: Pwu Lihbeen
- Wade–Giles: P'u^{2} Li^{4}-pen^{3}

Edwin George "Ted" Pulleyblank FRSC (August 7, 1922 – April 13, 2013) was a Canadian sinologist and linguist. He was a professor at the University of British Columbia. He was known for his studies of the historical phonology of Chinese.

== Life and career ==
Edwin G. "Ted" Pulleyblank was born on August 7, 1922, in Calgary, Alberta, Canada. His father, William George Edwin Pulleyblank, was a teacher of mathematics who later became a school vice-principal, and his mother, Ruth Pulleyblank, had also been a teacher. Pulleyblank was an avid student with a bright intellect and an excellent memory for details, and taught himself Ancient Greek while in high school. He matriculated at the University of Alberta in 1939 on an Alberta provincial government scholarship, and majored in the Latin and Greek Classics while also tutoring other students in math and physics in his spare time.

Pulleyblank graduated in 1942 at the height of World War II. Noticing his aptitude for both mathematics and foreign languages, one of Pulleyblank's professors offered him a chance to do "secret war work", which he accepted. On February 22, 1943 Pulleyblank joined the Examination Unit in Ottawa. This Unit was the civilian codebreaking unit of the Canadian Government. On May 13, 1943 Pulleyblank was sent to England to train with the Government Code and Cipher School at Bletchley Park. He returned to Canada and on December 12, 1943 joined the Japanese Diplomatic Section of the Examination Unit, and later began studying Chinese at Carleton University.

In 1946, Pulleyblank received a Chinese national government scholarship to study Chinese at the School of African and Oriental Studies, University of London (SOAS), where he stayed for two years. In 1948, SOAS made Pulleyblank a lecturer in Classical Chinese, even though he would later recall that his command of Japanese was at that time still better than his Chinese. He taught courses while pursuing doctoral studies under the German sinologist Walter Simon, and received a Ph.D. in 1951 for a dissertation entitled "The Background and Early Life of An Lu-shan".

Pulleyblank spent a year doing research at libraries in Tokyo and Kyoto, Japan, and also did additional studies in Chinese at Cambridge University, receiving an M.A. in 1953. In 1953, at only 31 years old, Pulleyblank was given the Professorship of Chinese at Cambridge, which he held for 13 years. Pulleyblank and his wife wanted to return to North America, and so in 1966 he left Cambridge to join the Asian Studies faculty at the University of British Columbia, where he remained until his retirement in 1987.

== Selected works ==
- The Background of the Rebellion of An Lu-shan, London, UK: Oxford University Press. 1955.
- Chinese History and World History: An inaugural lecture, Cambridge, UK: Cambridge University Press. 1955.
- Historians of China and Japan, Edited with W.G. Beasley. London, UK: Oxford University Press, 1961.
- "The Consonantal System of Old Chinese", Asia Major 9 (1962): 1962/1962-58.PDF 58–144, 1962/1962-206.pdf 206–265.
- Pulleyblank, E. G., 1963. ‘An interpretation of the vowel systems of Old Chinese and of Written Burmese’, Asia Major (new series) 10(2), 200–221.
- Pulleyblank, Edwin G. (1965). ‘The transcription of Sanskrit k and kh in Chinese.’ Asia Major (New Series) 11: 199–210.
- "Late Middle Chinese, Part I", Asia Major 15 (1970): 197–239.
- "Late Middle Chinese, Part II", Asia Major 16 (1971): 121–166.
- Pulleyblank, Edwin G. (1973). ‘Some new hypotheses concerning word families in Chinese.’ Journal of Chinese Linguistics 1.1: 111–125.
- Pulleyblank, Edwin G. 1981. "Han China in Central Asia." The International Historical Review 3.2:278-286. (Also in Pulleyblank 2002, §XI).
- Pulleyblank, Edwin G. (1983a). "The Chinese and their neighbors in prehistoric and early historic times." The origins of Chinese civilization, ed. David N. Keightley, 411–466 . Berkeley: University of California Press.
- Pulleyblank, Edwin G. (1983b). "Stages in the transcription of Indian words in Chinese from Han to Tang." Sprachen des Buddhismus in Zentralasien, ed. Klaus Rohrborn & Wolfgang Veenker, 73-102. Wiesbaden: Otto Harrassowitz.
- Middle Chinese: A Study in Historical Phonology, Vancouver, British Columbia, Canada: UBC Press. 1984. ISBN 978-0-7748-0192-8.
- Studies in Language Origins. Vol. I., ed by Jan Wind, Edwin G. Pulleyblank, Eric de Grolier and Bernard H. Bichakjian, Amsterdam and Philadelphia, PA: Benjamins, 1989. ISBN 978-1-55619-065-0.
- Pulleyblank, Edwin G. (1990). "The name of the Kirghiz." Central Asiatic Journal 34.1-2: 98–08. (Also in Pulleyblank 2002, §VIII).
- A Lexicon of Reconstructed Pronunciation in Early Middle Chinese, Late Middle Chinese and Early Mandarin, Vancouver, British Columbia, Canada: UBC Press. 1991. ISBN 978-0-7748-0366-3.
- A Chinese text in Central Asian Brahmi script: New evidence for the pronunciation of Late Middle Chinese and Khotanese, With R. E. Emmerick. Rome: Istituto Italiano per il Medio ed Estremo Oriente. 1993.
- Outline of Classical Chinese Grammar, Vancouver, British Columbia, Canada: UBC Press. 1995. ISBN 978-0-7748-0541-4.
- "The Roman Empire as known to Han China." A review article on The Roman Empire in Chinese Sources. D. D. Leslie and K. H. J. Gardiner. Rome (1996). Review by Edwin G. Pulleyblank. JAOS 119.1 (1999), pp. 71–79. JSTOR 605541
- "The Nomads in China and Central Asia in the Post-Han Period," in: Hans Robert ROEMER (Hg.), History of the Turkic Peoples in the Pre-Islamic Period. Histoire des Peuples Turcs à l’Époque Pré-Islamique. (2000). Philologiae et Historiae Turcicae Fundamenta Tomus Primus. Berlin: Klaus Schwarz Verlag, S. pp. 76–94. (Philologiae Turcicae Fundamenta; III) ISBN 978-3-87997-283-8.
- Essays on Tang and pre-Tang China, Aldershot, UK, and Burlington, VT, USA: Ashgate. 2001. ISBN 978-0-86078-858-4.
- Central Asia and Non-Chinese Peoples of Ancient China. Aldershot, UK, and Burlington, VT, USA: Ashgate. 2002. ISBN 978-0-86078-859-1.
