= Faculty of Economics, University of Cambridge =

Constituent department of the University of Cambridge

Faculty of Economics
- Former names: Faculty of Economics and Politics
- Established: c. 1903
- Affiliations: University of Cambridge
- Chair of Faculty: Leonardo Felli
- Location: Cambridge, United Kingdom
- Website: http://www.econ.cam.ac.uk

The Faculty of Economics is one of the constituent departments of the University of Cambridge. It is composed of five research groups, in macroeconomics, microeconomic theory, economic history, econometrics, and empirical microeconomics. It is located in the Sidgwick Site in Cambridge, has been host to many distinguished economists, and is regarded as the birthplace of macroeconomics. 19 students or members of the faculty have won the Nobel Memorial Prize in Economic Sciences.

== History ==
The Faculty of Economics was first created by Alfred Marshall in 1903, although the first notable Cambridge economist is considered to be Thomas Malthus. After Marshall, the faculty was home to Arthur Cecil Pigou, father of public economics, John Hicks, who pioneered the IS-LM model and general equilibrium theory, and John Maynard Keynes, father of modern macroeconomics. The faculty retained a strong Keynesian bend in its thinking well into the late 20th century.

== Courses ==
Today, the faculty offers one undergraduate course, the economics tripos, and five graduate programs: an advanced diploma in economics, master of philosophy degrees (MPhil) in economics, economic research, and finance and economics, and a PhD in economics.

The undergraduate course is taught over the course of three years. In Part I, all students take the same five courses: microeconomics, macroeconomics, quantitative methods in economics, social and political aspects of economics, and British economic history. In the later two years, students continue to take courses in macroeconomics and microeconomics with more freedom to choose additional courses, and all students write a dissertation in their third year.

== Current faculty ==
- Giancarlo Corsetti (Clare)
- Sir Partha Dasgupta (St. John's)
- Sanjeev Goyal (Christ's)
- Tony Lawson (Emmanuel)
- Oliver Linton (Trinity)
- Murray Milgate (Trinity/Queens')
- David Newbery (Trinity)
- M. Hashem Pesaran (Trinity)
- Robert Rowthorn (King's)

== Alumni and former faculty ==
- R. G. D. Allen (Sidney Sussex)
- Kenneth Arrow (Churchill)
- Andrew Bailey (Queens')
- Rowland Baring, 3rd Earl of Cromer (Trinity)
- Peter Thomas Bauer (Caius)
- Charlie Bean (Emmanuel)
- David Bensusan-Butt (King's)
- Christopher Bliss (King's)
- D. G. Champernowne (King's/Trinity)
- Ha-Joon Chang (Robinson)
- Robert Chote (Queens')
- Cameron Cobbold, 1st Baron Cobbold (King's)
- John James Cowperthwaite (Christ's)
- Walter Cunliffe, 1st Baron Cunliffe (Trinity)
- Angus Deaton (Fitzwilliam), Nobel Prize winner
- Gérard Debreu (Churchill), Nobel Prize winner
- Peter Diamond (Churchill), Nobel Prize winner
- Maurice Dobb (Pembroke/Trinity)
- John Eatwell, Baron Eatwell (Queens')
- Robert Fogel (Trinity), Nobel Prize winner
- Milton Friedman (Caius), Nobel Prize winner
- John Kenneth Galbraith (Trinity)
- Pierangelo Garegnani (Trinity)
- Sir Edward George (Emmanuel)
- Anthony Giddens (King's)
- Claude Guillebaud (St. John's)
- Sir Gilbert Heathcote, 1st Baronet (Christ's)
- Oliver Hart (King's/Churchill), Nobel Prize winner
- Noreena Hertz (King's)
- John Hicks (Caius), Nobel Prize winner
- John C. Hull
- Richard Kahn (King's)
- John Maynard Keynes (King's)
- Mervyn King (King's/St. John's)
- Patrick Lynch (Peterhouse)
- Thomas Malthus (Jesus)
- Alfred Marshall (St. John's)
- Eric Maskin (Darwin)
- James Meade (Trinity), Nobel Prize winner
- James Mirrlees (Trinity), Nobel Prize winner
- Robert Neild (Trinity)
- William Nordhaus (Clare Hall), Nobel Prize winner
- Montagu Norman, 1st Baron Norman (King's)
- Douglass North (Girton), Nobel Prize winner
- Sheilagh Ogilvie (Trinity)
- Luigi Pasinetti (King's)
- Arthur Cecil Pigou (King's)
- Rogelio Ramírez de la O (Fitzwilliam)
- Frank P. Ramsey (Magdalene/Trinity/King's)
- Gordon Richardson (Caius)
- Dennis Robertson (Trinity)
- Austin Robinson (Sidney Sussex)
- Joan Robinson (Girton/Newnham/King's)
- Amartya Sen (Trinity), Nobel Prize winner and former Master of Trinity
- Gerald Shove (King's)
- Ajit Singh (Queens')
- Piero Sraffa (Trinity)
- Joseph Stiglitz (Caius/Fitzwilliam), Nobel Prize winner
- Richard Stone (Caius/King's), Nobel Prize winner
- Adam Tooze (King's)
- Geoff Whitty (St. John's)
- Yuen Pau Woo
- Stefanie Stantcheva

== See also ==
- Marshall Library of Economics
- Listed buildings in Cambridge (west)
