= Emile Mond =

German businessman

Emile Moritz Schweich-Mond (1865 – 30 December 1938, London) was a German businessman who mostly worked in England. From 1930 to 1938, he was the honorary treasurer of the Faraday Society.

== Early life ==
Emile Mond was born in 1865 in Cologne, Rhine Province, Kingdom of Prussia. He was the son of Leopold Schweich and Philippine Schweich, and initially studied in Paris, where his father was working at the time. He then studied chemistry in Switzerland at the ETH Zurich. He moved to England to work with his uncle, Ludwig Mond at Brunner Mond & Co. From Cheshire he moved to Jamaica with his friend Emile Bucher and founded the West Indies Chemical Works. He then returned to England again to work as an assistant to his uncle. He was on the Board of Brunner Mond & Co. and of Mond Nickel Co. He was chairman of Ashmore, Benson, Pease & Co., the South Staffordshire Mond Gas Co., and the Power Gas Co.

== Family ==
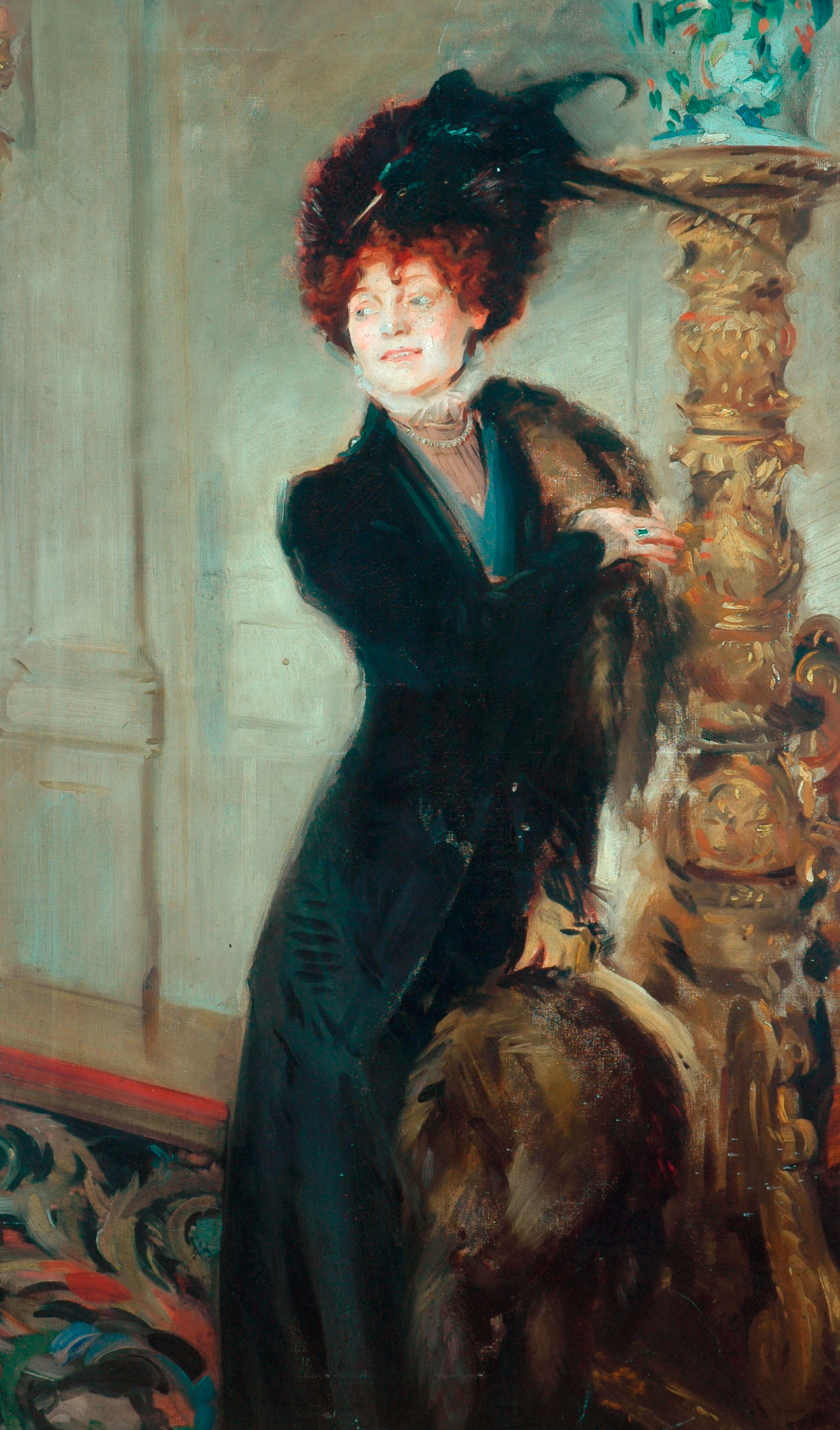
Mrs Emile Mond by William Bruce Ellis Ranken

He married Angela Primrose Schweich-Mond, née Goetze (March 1871, Marylebone, London – 8 November 1941, Storrington, West Sussex), the youngest child of James Henry Goetze (7 September 1823, Soho, London – September 1877, Marylebone, he is buried at Paddington Old Cemetery, Kilburn) and Rosina Harriett Bentley. Other children are Violet Mond, Baroness Melchett, who married Alfred Mond, 1st Baron Melchett, Emile's cousin, and English painter and art patron Sigismund Goetze.

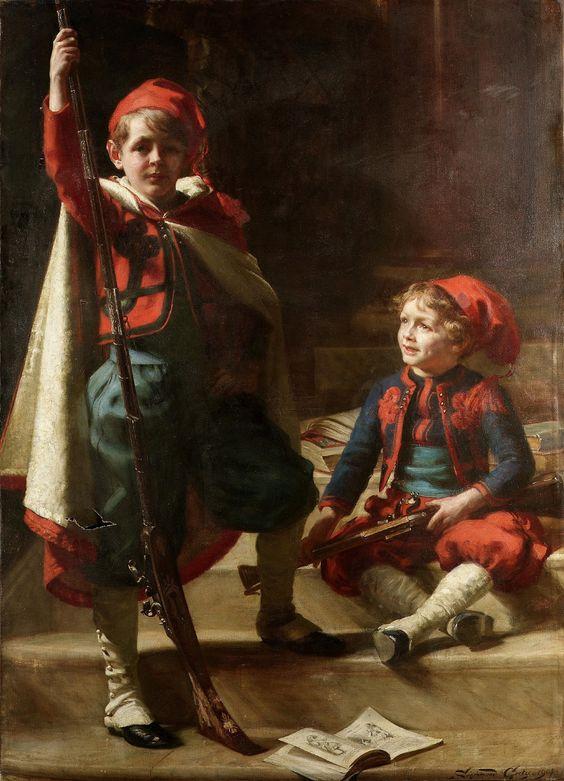
Portrait of Francis and Philip Mond, sons of Emile Mond (1904) by Sigismund Christian Hubert Goetze (British 1866–1939)

Emile and Angela Mond had four sons and a daughter:

- Philip Otto Leopold Schweich-Mond (27 June 1887, London – 5 December 1944, Zürich, Switzerland). Married Elizabeth Schweich-Mond. One son: Rupert Carlo Mond.
- Francis Leopold Schweich-Mond (20 July 1895, London – 15 May 1918, Bouzancourt, Haute-Marne, Alsace-Champagne-Ardenne-Lorraine, France). He was shot down over Bouzancourt, France and is buried at Doullens, Somme, Nord-Pas-de-Calais-Picardie, France.
- Alfred William Schweich-Mond (1901, Paddington, London – 12 September 1929, Storrington, West Sussex, England). He committed suicide.
- Countess May Constance Viola Cippico (née Schweich-Mond) (3 May 1904, London – 8 August 1980, Hampshire, England). She married Count Aldo Marino Cippico. One daughter, Marina Angela Marguerita Rainey. One son Stefano Daniele Cippico
- Stephen Edward Bentley Schweich-Mond (21 February 1908, Paddington, London – 23 March 1955, Southwark, Greater London)

Francis was killed while flying in France on 15 May 1918: to honor him, Emile Mond established the Francis Mond Professorship of Aeronautical Engineering at Cambridge, the first British chair in that subject. Originally attached to the Special Board for Mathematics, the professorship was assigned on its creation in 1923 to the Special Board for Engineering Studies, and in 1927 to the Faculty of Engineering.

== Personal life ==
Emile Mond was created Officier de la Légion d'honneur by the French Government and Officier de l'Ordre de Leopold by the King of the Belgians.

Emile Mond's wife was a musician and held private chamber music concerts. Mr. and Mrs. Mond made their home a centre of hospitality and of the cultured social life of London.
