= Asia Major (journal) =

- Discipline: Chinese history, formerly East Asian history
- Language: English, German, French

Publication details
- History: 1923–1933 (First Series); 1949–1975 (New Series); 1988–present (Third Series)
- Publisher: Verlag der Asia Major (1923–1933); University of Cambridge, University of Oxford, University of London (1949–1975); Princeton University (1988–1997); Academia Sinica (1998–present)
- Frequency: Annually

Standard abbreviations
- ISO 4: Asia Major

Indexing
- ISSN: 0004-4482
- LCCN: 31007114
- JSTOR: 00044482
- OCLC no.: 1010640739

Links
- Journal homepage

Asia Major is an annual peer-reviewed academic journal that focuses on the history of China. From 1923 to 1933 it was based in Germany, from 1949 to 1975 in Great Britain, from 1988 to 1997 in the U.S., and since 1998 in Taiwan.

The journal was originally established in the early 1920s in Leipzig by Jewish-German Sinologist Bruno Schindler (1882–1964), but the original series ended in 1933 when he was forced to flee Germany. In 1949, he revived it in Great Britain where he emigrated to. It was edited by Walter Simon in the years 1964–75. The latest series (Third Series) was revived by Denis Twitchett at Princeton University in 1975, and in 1998 it moved to Taiwan's Academia Sinica with the support of Tu Cheng-sheng.
