= Arthur Balfour Professor of Genetics =

The Arthur Balfour Professorship of Genetics is the senior professorship in genetics at the University of Cambridge, founded in 1912. It is thought to be the oldest Chair of Genetics in the English speaking world.

The chair was endowed by Reginald Baliol Brett, 2nd Viscount Esher, according to whom the money (£20,000) was "placed in [his] hands" by an anonymous benefactor. A condition of the endowment was that the first appointee to the chair would be chosen jointly by the Prime Minister H. H. Asquith and the former Prime Minister Arthur Balfour.

== Arthur Balfour Professors ==
- Reginald Punnett (1912–1940)
- Ronald Fisher (1943–1957)
- John Marion Thoday (1959–1983)
- John Robert Stanley Fincham (1984–1991)
- Peter Neville Goodfellow (1992–1996)
- David Moore Glover (1999–2015)
- Anne Ferguson-Smith (2015– )
