= Professor of Mineralogy (Cambridge) =

The Professorship of Mineralogy was a professorship at the University of Cambridge. It was founded in 1808 and discontinued when its final holder retired in 1931. It was replaced by the Professorship of Mineralogy and Petrology.

== Professors of Mineralogy ==
- Edward Daniel Clarke (1808)
- John Stevens Henslow (1822)
- William Whewell (1828)
- William Hallowes Miller (1832)
- William James Lewis (1881)
- Arthur Hutchinson (1926–1931)
