= Timeline of the discovery and classification of minerals =

Georgius Agricola is considered the 'father of mineralogy'. Nicolas Steno founded the stratigraphy (the study of rock layers (strata) and layering (stratification)), the geology characterizes the rocks in each layer and the mineralogy characterizes the minerals in each rock. The chemical elements were discovered in identified minerals and with the help of the identified elements the mineral crystal structure could be described. One milestone was the discovery of the geometrical law of crystallization by René Just Haüy, a further development of the work by Nicolas Steno and Jean-Baptiste L. Romé de l'Isle (the characterisation of a crystalline mineral needs knowledge on crystallography). Important contributions came from some Saxon "Bergraths"/ Freiberg Mining Academy: Johann F. Henckel, Abraham Gottlob Werner and his students (August Breithaupt, Robert Jameson, José Bonifácio de Andrada and others). Other milestones were the notion that metals are elements too (Antoine Lavoisier) and the periodic table of the elements by Dmitri Ivanovich Mendeleev. The overview of the organic bonds by Kekulé was necessary to understand the silicates, first refinements described by Bragg and Machatschki; and it was only possibly to understand a crystal structure with Dalton's atomic theory, the notion of atomic orbital and Goldschmidt's explanations. Specific gravity, streak (streak color and mineral hardness) and X-ray powder diffraction are quite specific for a Nickel-Strunz identifier (updated 9th ed.). Nowadays, non-destructive electron microprobe analysis is used to get the empirical formula of a mineral. Finally, the International Zeolite Association (IZA) took care of the zeolite frameworks (part of molecular sieves and/or molecular cages).

There are only a few thousand mineral species and 83 geochemically stable chemical elements combine to form them (84 elements, if plutonium and the Atomic Age are included). The mineral evolution in the geologic time context were discussed and summarised by Arkadii G. Zhabin (and subsequent Russian workers), Robert M. Hazen, William A. Deer, Robert A. Howie and Jack Zussman.

== Milestones ==
=== Neolithic Age, and after it ===
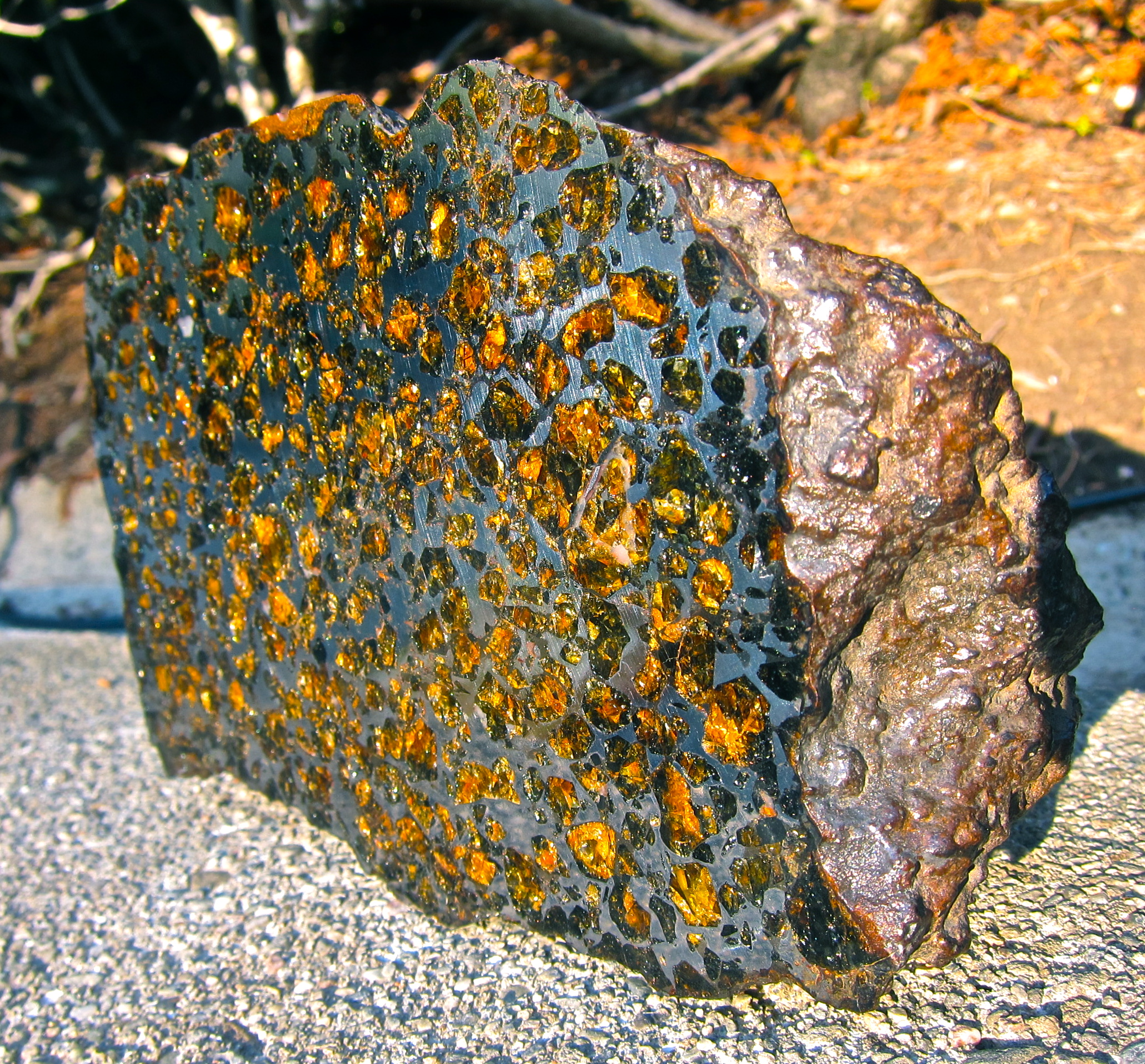
Pallasite (olivine crystals of peridot quality in an iron-nickel matrix), Brahin (meteorite)

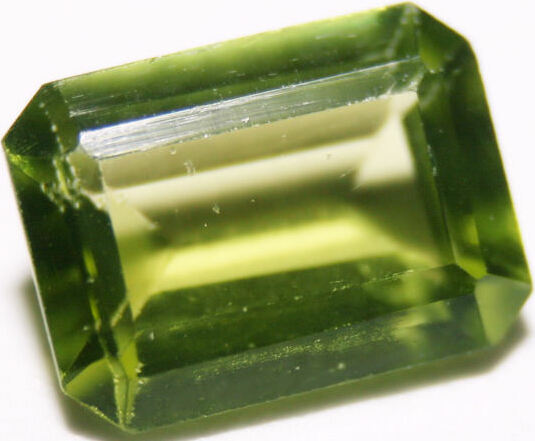
Olive green peridot (syn. chrysolite)

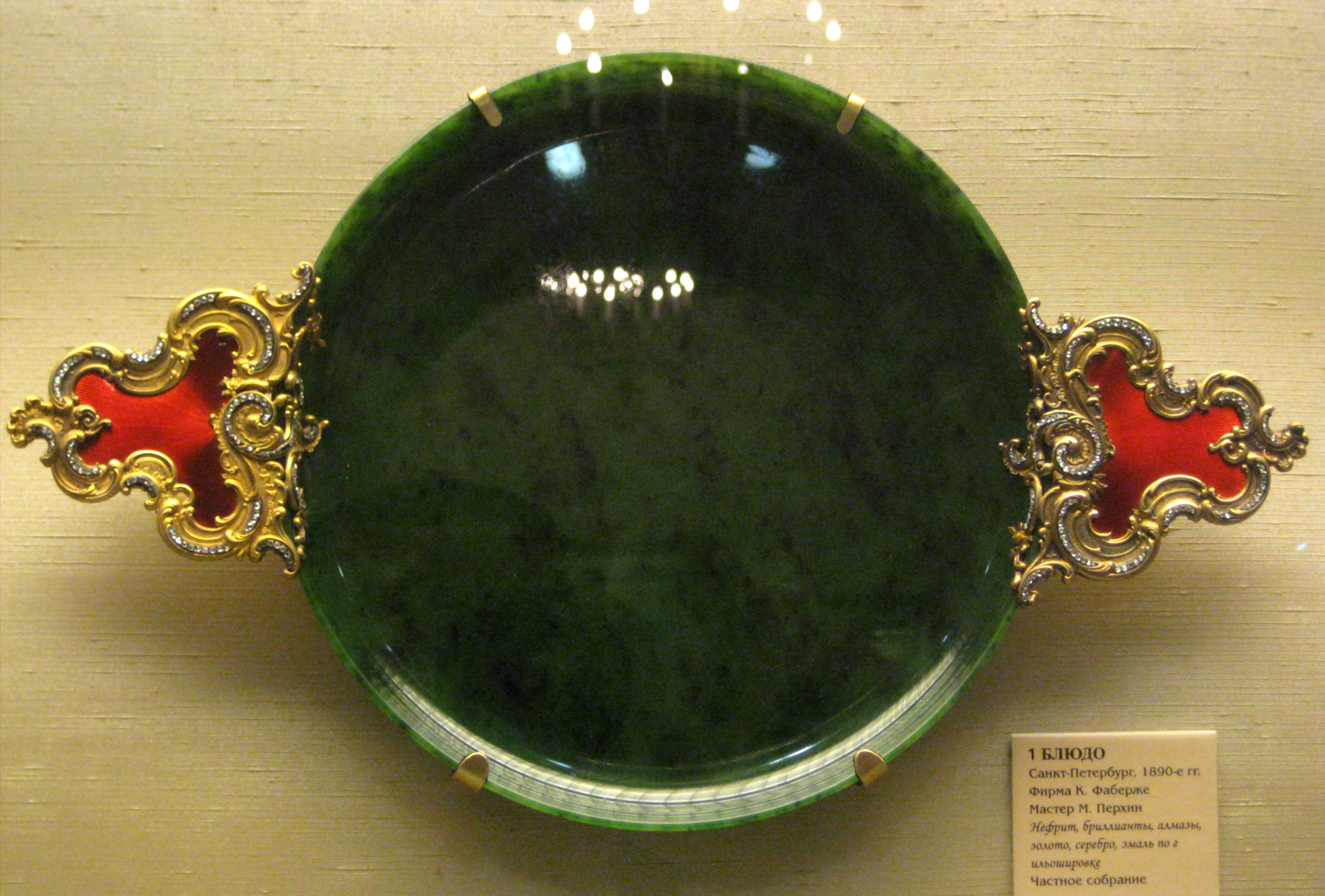
Nephrite dish – House of Fabergé (1890s)

- Neolithic Age (new stone era) beginning about 10,200 years ago: flint tools (diagenesis of marine microfossils, microcristalline opal and chalcedony), jade tools (usually nephrite, jadeitite or jadeite-jade is less common), kaolin earth (adobe bricks made by drying of clay), copper, gold, silver and rocksalt. Locally, beads of turquoise and lazurite are found.
  - Göbekli Tepe, Anatolia, dating back to the 10th–8th millennium BC.
  - Note: nephrite is a microcristalline variety of tremolite (ferro-actinolite–tremolite solid solution series); white nephrite is almost pure tremolite and iron gives nephrite its green colour.
- Bronze Age, Near East (3600–1200 BC), Europe (3600–600 BC), Indian Subcontinent (3300–1200 BC).
  - Chalcolithic Age (copper age) beginning about 7,000 years ago: copper, gold, silver, mercury.
  - In the early Bronze Age, lead was used with antimony and arsenic.
  - The use of meteoric iron–nickel alloy has been traced as far back as 3500 BC.
- Iron Age, Ancient Near East (1300–600 BC), India (1200–200 BC), Europe (1200 BC – 400 AD).
- Illustration, Torah (in Hebrew), Septuagint (translation in Ancient Greek), Vulgate (translation in Latin), Douay–Rheims Bible (translation in English), Book of Numbers 31:22: Gold, and silver, and brass, and iron, and lead, and tin (Latin: "aurum et argentum et aes et ferrum et stagnum et plumbum"). Book of Exodus 28:16–20 cites following decorative stones (list of precious stones in the Bible): (the "breastplate" or "rational" of the Jewish High Priest) It shall be foursquare and doubled: it shall be the measure of a span both in length and in breadth. And thou shalt set in it four rows of stones: in the first row shall be a sardius stone, and a topaz, and an emerald (Latin: "primo versu erit lapis sardius et topazius et zmaragdus"): In the second a carbuncle, a sapphire and a jasper (Latin: "in secundo carbunculus sapphyrus et iaspis"). In the third a ligurius, an agate, and an amethyst (Latin: "in tertio ligyrius achates et amethistus"): In the fourth a chrysolite, an onyx, and a beryl (Latin: "in quarto chrysolitus onychinus et berillus"). They shall be set in gold by their rows. Book of Revelation 21:19–20: And the foundations of the wall of the city were adorned with all manner of precious stones. The first foundation was jasper: the second, sapphire: the third, a chalcedony: the fourth, an emerald: The fifth, sardonyx: the sixth, sardius: the seventh, chrysolite: the eighth, beryl: the ninth, a topaz: the tenth, a chrysoprasus: the eleventh, a jacinth: the twelfth, an amethyst (Latin: "primum iaspis secundus sapphyrus tertius carcedonius quartus zmaragdus quintus sardonix sextus sardinus septimus chrysolitus octavus berillus nonus topazius decimus chrysoprassus undecimus hyacinthus duodecimus amethistus").
  - Suggested combined translation: a red aggregate of microgranular speckled ferruginous "chalcedony" ("from" Heybeliada?, Prince Islands, Chalcedon, Constantinople's sphere of influence) (iaspis, jasper; it means "spotted or speckled stone"); corundum, var. sapphire; "chalcedony", var. onyx; beryl, var. emerald ("from" Mons Smaragdus?, Wadi El Gamal National Park); "chalcedony", var. agate (sardonyx, "from" river "Achates" (river Dirillo), Sicily); "chalcedony", var. sard (sardius; "from" Sardis, Asia Minor); topaz (chrysolite; "from" Topazon Island?, Seven Sisters, Gulf of Tadjoura); beryl, var. aquamarine; olive greenish yellow fosterite, var. peridot (topaz "from" Topazios (Zabargad Island), Red Sea); "chalcedony", var. chrysoprase ("from" Liguria, Italy); red pyrope (carbuncle, jacinth, hyacinth; a garnet, almandine-pyrope series); quartz, var. amethyst. Note: the fosterite–fayalite solid solution series is called olivine.
- Illustration, Ancient Egypt. Ancient Egyptian funerary practices: a natural material found in Wadi Natrun is used (a mixture of natron and rocksalt (?)). The iconic gold burial mask of Tutankhamun, has inlays of turquoise, lapis lazuli, carnelian and coloured glass. Eye shadow (kohl) using black galena, green malachite, stibnite, lead or coal, for instance.
- Illustration, Persian Empire (728–330 BC period) and Babylonian Empire: blue (lapis lazuli) glazed bricks, for instance (Ishtar Gate, Pergamon Museum).

=== Greco-Roman and Byzantine period, mainly ===
- Greco-Roman period:
  - De Anima Libri III of Aristotle (4th century BC). Description of mercury (metal).
  - Theophrastus (c. 371 – c. 287 BC)
    - Theophrastus (1956). Theophrastus On Stones: Introduction, Greek text, English translation, and Commentary (315 BC). Translated by John F. Richards, Earle Radcliffe Caley. Columbus, Ohio: Ohio State University. p. 238. hdl:1811/32541.
    - Illustration: amber (lyncurion of Theophrastus), chrysocolla, agate, cinnabar, orpiment, realgar. First brass (calamine plus copper process) appears in the middle of first century BC in the Roman Imperium, zircon and tourmalines are not found on ancient art works.
  - The oldest known pills were made of the zinc carbonates hydrozincite (described 1853) and smithsonite (described 1832). Calamine is a historic name for an ore of zinc (hemimorphite (IMA1962 s.p.) and smithsonite).
  - De architectura (about 15 BC) of Marcus Vitruvius Pollio, Libri X, vol. VII, Caput 8. Note: description of natural mercury from the Cilbian fields near the former Greek city of Ephesus.
  - Dioscorides, Pedanius (1557). "Liber v" (PDF). De materia medica (in Latin). Translated by Cornarius J. Basileae: Froben. pp. 454–455. Book V: Minerals, description of melanterite (50 AD) and chalcanthite (70 AD).
  - Naturalis Historia [The Natural History]: (77 AD) of Gaius Plinius Secundus (Pliny the Elder, 23 AD – 25 August 79 AD).
    - Volumes: liber xxxv (alumen); liber xxxvi (limestone); liber xxxvii [Book XXXVII – The Natural History of Precious Stones] (augites).
    - Illustration: turquoise (callais of Pliny), tourmaline, almandine (corruption of alabandicus of Pliny), moroxite (apatite var.), limestone (calcite), magnetite, emery (corundum, hematite and magnetite), atramentum sutorium (goslarite, melanterite), misy from Cyprus (copiapite, hydroniumjarosite, jarosite, natrojarosite). Note: alabandicus of Pliny is a garnet worked at Alabanda (Αλαβάνδα, an ancient city of Caria, Anatolia).
  - Pliny the Younger (61 – c. 113 AD), Epistulae (Letters): description of calcite and beryl.
- Damigeron de Lapidibus, "Orphei Lithica" (c. IV AD) [translated to Latin by Eugenius Abel, 1881]. Note: describes curing of ailments by 30 stones.
- Isidore of Seville (c. 600 AD) Etymologiae.
- Turkish traveller Muḥammad Abū'l-Qāsim Ibn Ḥawqal: Ibn Hawqal (977 AD) "The Face of the Earth".
- Abū al-Rayhān Muhammad ibn Ahmad al-Bīrūnī (973–1048): Al-Biruni (1000) The Book Most Comprehensive in Knowledge On Precious Stones. He considers "zarnarrud" (emerald) and "zabarjad" (peridot) the same mineral.
- Uzbek (Persian) scholar and physician, Avicenna (about 980 – June 1037). He wrote almost 450 treatises on a wide range of subjects, of which around 240 have survived.
- Illustration, elements known to the ancients (about 1000 AD, timeline of chemical elements discoveries): carbon, sulfur, iron, arsenic, antimony, zinc, copper, lead, silver, tin, gold, mercury.
- Marbode (1100).
- Anglicus, Bartholomeus (1240). "Liber xvi – De lapidibus et metallis" [Book XVI – On rocks, gems and minerals]. De proprietatibus rerum [On the Properties of Things].
- Albertus Magnus (Albert the Great, 1193/1206 – 15 November 1280). Isolation of arsenic.
- Prior to the Spanish conquest (1492):
  - Pre-Columbian Americans used platinum.
  - Ancestral Puebloans (Anasazi) traded with turquoise.
- Illustration:
  - Realgar from Arabic "rahj al-gahr" (powder of the mine). Salammoniac (άλς άμμωυιακός: sals ammonikos, salt of Ammon), for rocksalt mined by Amun's Temple, Egypt. Trabzonite (IMA1983-071a) for Trabzon, Turkey (Τραπεζοῦς: Trapezous, Trebizond).
  - There are three large peridots probably from the 12th century in the Shrine of the Three Magi in Cologne Cathedral, they were believed to be emeralds.
  - Crown Jewels of the United Kingdom: the Black Prince's Ruby (a spinel) was given in 1367 to its namesake, Edward of Woodstock (the "Black Prince").

=== After the fall of Constantinople (after 1453) ===
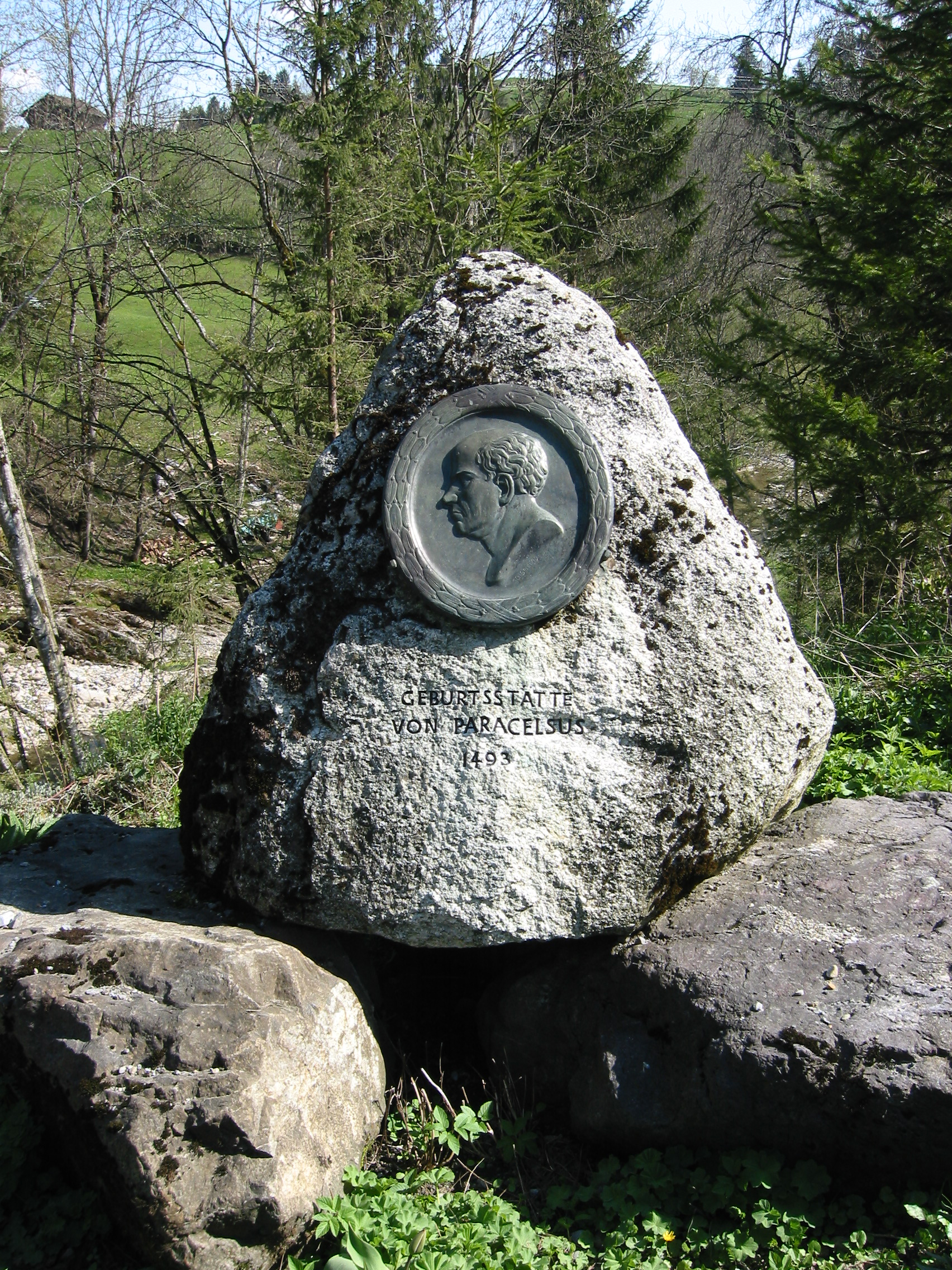
Paracelsus (birth place: near Devil's bridge), commemorative plaque.

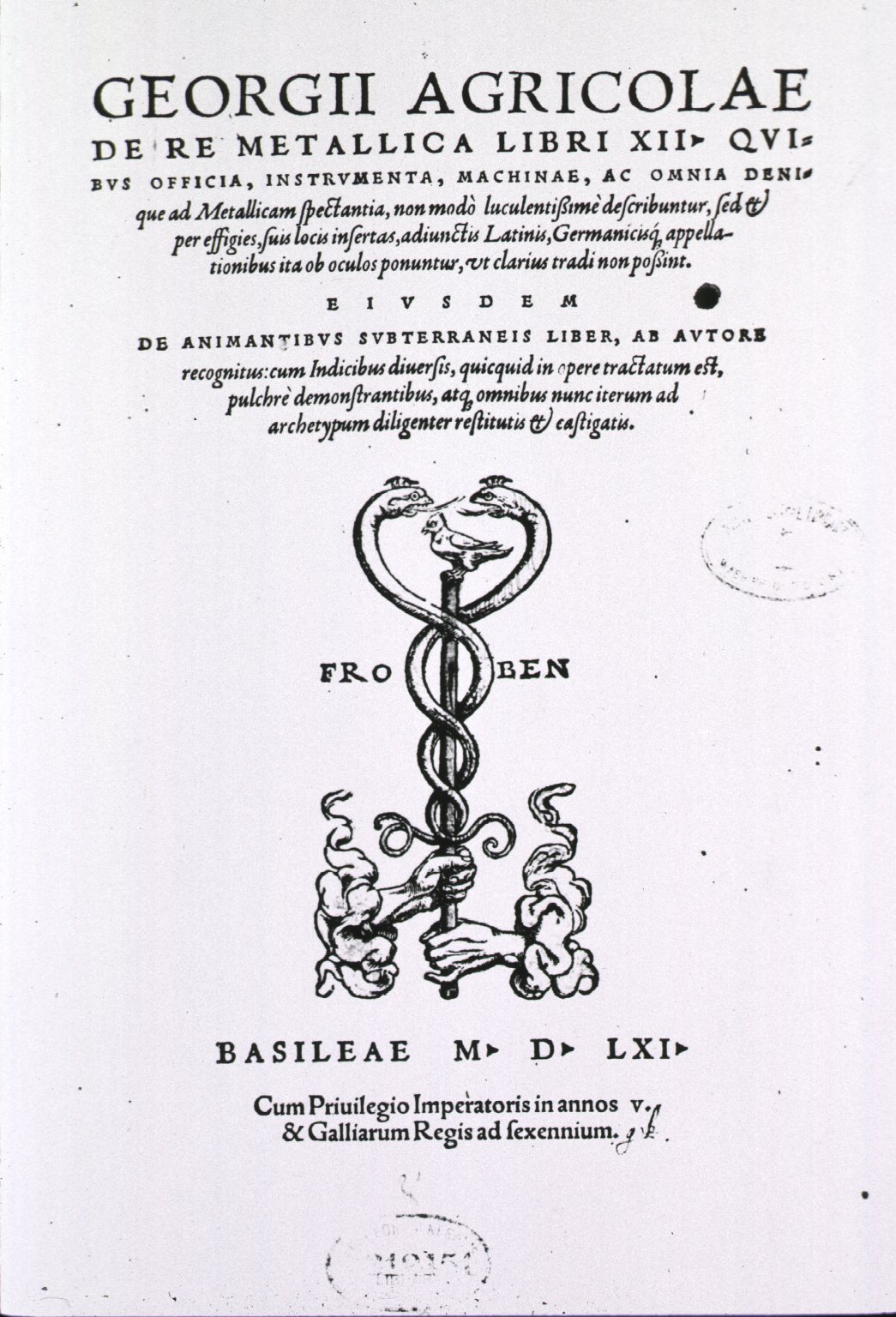
Front page of De re metallica, liber XII.

- Leonardi (1502) "Speculum lapidum".
- Theophrast von Hohenheim (Paracelsus, 1493–1541), Swiss-born physician: description of bismuth and naming of zinc (1526).
- Calbus Freibergius (Latin for Ulrich Rülein von Calw, 1527) Ein nützlich Bergbüchlin, Erffurd: Johan Loersfelt. Note: description of bismuth.
- Georgius Agricola (Latin for Georg Bauer, 24 March 1494 – 21 November 1555), he is "father of mineralogy".
  - Bermannus sive de re metallica (1530) [Bermannus; or a dialogue about the nature of metals]. Notes: based on "Ein nützlich Bergbüchlin", mention of fluorite.
  - De Ortu & Causis Subterraneorum (1546), liber v. Note: description of talc.
  - De natura fossilium (1546) [On the Nature of Rocks], liber x. Note: mention of alabandite (alabandicus lapis).
  - De re metallica (1556) [On Metals], liber xii. Note: description of salammoniac.
  - Illustration: borax (chrysocolla of Agricola), marcasite (lebererz of Agricola), lazurite (sapphis of Agricola), wolframite (hübnerite–ferberite series), orpiment.
- Alchemist Alexander von Suchten (about 1520 – 1575)
  - De Secretis Antimonij liber vnus, Straßburg (1570); Zween Tractat, Vom Antimonio, Mömpelgard (1604); Antimonii Mysteria Gemina, Leipzig (1604)
- Alchemist Johann Thölde (about 1565 – about 1614). He is probably one of the authors behind the pseudonym Basilius Valentinus and so he published about antimony. He published works by Alexander von Suchten and he published under his own name too, so his literature isn't clear.
- Alchemist Biringuccio, Vannoccio (1959). De la pirotechnia (1540). Dover books on earth sciences: Dover Classics of Science and Mathematics. Translated by Cyril Stanley Smith and Martha Teach Gnudi. Courier Dover Publications. p. 477. ISBN 978-0-486-26134-8.
  - The book has a chapter about antimony ('antimony' means here its sulfide, antimonite or stibnite). The isolation of antimony was accomplished in the German territory at this time.
- De omni rerum fossilium genere, gemmis, lapidibus, metallis, et huiusmodi, libri aliquot, plerique nunc primum editi (1565) of Conrad Gesner, description of cerussite (synthetic lead carbonate was known as "ceruse") and alunite (as "alumen de Tolpha" from Monti della Tolfa).
- 1603, Italian shoemaker and alchemist Vincenzo Cascariolo discovers that calcinated baryte (barium sulfate to barium sulfide, Bologna stone) from Mount Paderno (an extinct volcano in Bologna) has a luminescence.
- Théodore de Mayerne (1573 – 1654 or 1655), Swiss-born physician who treated kings of France and England: calomel's description (treatment with mercury(I) chloride, specially against syphilis).
- Song Yingxing (1637) "Tiangong Kaiwu" ["The Exploitation of the Works of Nature"]: description of kaolin earth from Gaoling or Kauling, Fuliang County.
  - Note: common kaolin earth bearing iron oxide and organic impurities can be used in the earthenware production, but not in the porcelain production.
- de Boodt, Anselmus; Tollius, Adrianus (1647). Gemmarum et Lapidum Historia (3 ed.). Maire. pp. 576. Note: first definitive work of modern mineralogy.
- Nicols, Thomas (1652). A Lapidary or, The History of Precious Stones: With Cautions for the Undeceiving of all those that deal with Precious Stones (1 ed.). Cambridge: printed by Thomas Buck. p. 239. Note: it was written with the help of 'de Boodt's' book.
- Johann Martin Michaelis (1693). Museum Spenerianum sive Catalogus Rerum: Das Naturalienkabinett von Johann Jacob Sener [Catalogue of the mineral collection of Johann Jacob Sener]. Leipzig: Christoph Fleischer. Note: Johann Jacob Sener, professor of physics and mathematics, Akademie zu Halle; he named "minera plumbi viridis" (pyromorphite).
- Hennig Brand (c. 1630 – c. 1710), discovery of phosphorus (around 1669).
- John Woodward (1665–1728), founder by bequest of the Woodwardian Professorship of Geology at Cambridge University. He collected and catalogued over 35 years nearly 10,000 specimens; they are in five walnut cabinets now in the Sedgwick Museum of Earth Sciences. He named a mineral of his collection "corinvindum" (from Sanskrit "Kuruvinda", meaning ruby, a variety of "corundum"); and he had a specimen of "minera plumbi viridis" (pyromorphite).
  - Woodward, John (1714). Naturalis historia telluris illustrata & aucta (in Latin).
    - Johann Jakob Scheuchzer (1672–1733), Swiss naturalist, one of the four city physicians of Zürich; he held the chair of physics and mathematics (University of Zürich).
  - Woodward, John (1725). An Addition to the Catalogue of the Foreign Native Fossils in the Collection of J. Woodward M.D. London.
- Steno, Nicolas (1669). De solido intra solidum naturaliter contento. He is one of the founders of modern stratigraphy and modern geology.

=== Lavoisier, Werner, Haüy, Klaproth, Berzelius and Dalton (after 1715) ===
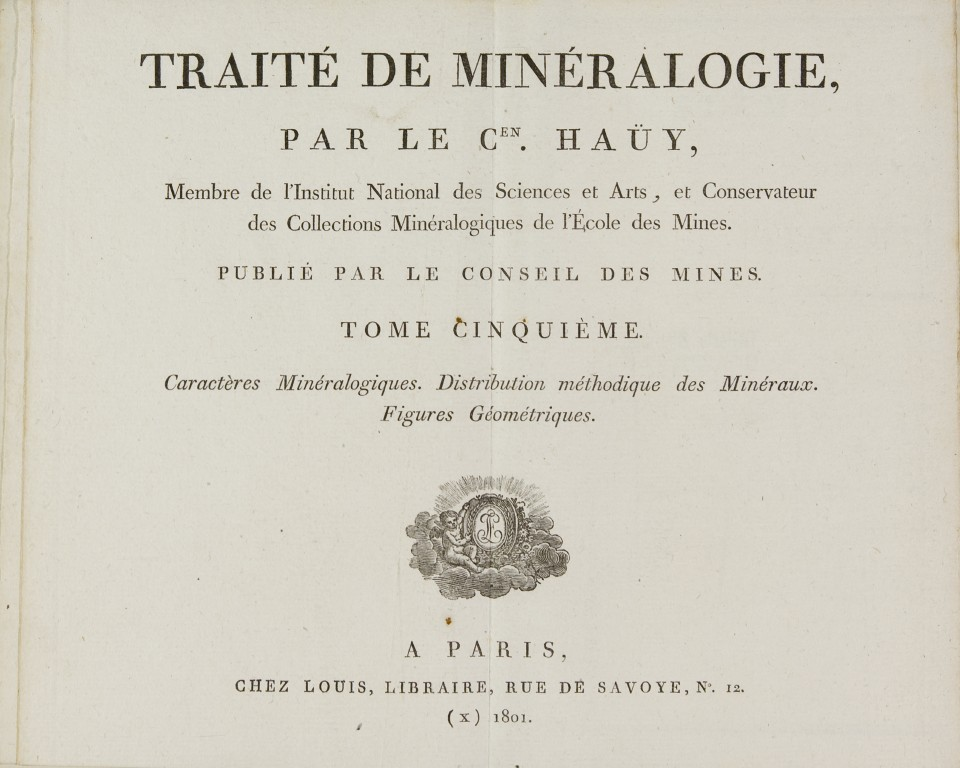
René Just Haüy: Traité de Minéralogie – Tome cinquième (1801)

- Georg Brandt (26 June 1694 – 29 April 1768), discovery of cobalt (c. 1735).
- Johan Gottschalk Wallerius (1709–1785). Note: he renamed Agricola's Lupi spuma (1546, tungsten, element symbol -W-), in Wolfrahm (German, 1747).
  - Wallerius J G (1747). Mineralogia, eller mineralriket indelt och beskrifvet. Stockholm.
  - Wallerius J G; Denso J D (1750). Mineralogie, oder Mineralreich. Berlin: Berlegts Christoph Gottlieb Nicolai.
- Johann F. Henckel (1678–1744), his library was the origin of the Freiberg Mining Academy.
  - Johann F. Henckel (1756). Kleine Minerologische und Chymische Schriften. Dresden/Leipzig.
- Saxony had to pay reparations after the Seven Years' War: the mining industry got stronger and the Freiberg Mining Academy was founded (1765).
- Carolus Linnaeus (1768) "Liber iii – Regnum Lapideum". Systema naturae per regna tria naturae, Secundum Classes, Ordines, Genera, species cum characteribus & differentiis (12 ed.). Stockholm: Laurentii Salvii, Homiae, 236 p. It develops the binomial nomenclature for the species of the Tree of Life.
  - Note: first description of dolomite. The binomial nomenclature could not be used for minerals; it is easier to administrate c. 5,000 valid minerals (the species of the Tree of Life are relatives of each other. A mineral classification needs the contributions of: Nicolas Steno, Antoine-Laurent de Lavoisier, Jean-Baptiste L. Romé de l'Isle, René Just Haüy, John Dalton, Dmitri Ivanovich Mendeleev, August Kekulé, Victor Goldschmidt, chemical formula and unit cell structure, etc.
- T. Olof Bergman (1784). Manuel du minéralogiste, ou sciagraphie du règne minéral. Note: founder of analytical chemistry.
- Daniel Rutherford (1749–1819), isolation of nitrogen (1772).
- Ignaz von Born (1790). Catalogue Methodique et Raisonné de la Collection des Fossiles de Mlle. Éléonore De Raab.
- Antoine-Laurent de Lavoisier (26 August 1743 – 8 May 1794), naming of oxygen (1778) and hydrogen (1783), prediction of silicon (1778) and establishment of sulfur as an element (1777).
- Johann F. Gmelin (1793). "Liber iii – Regnum Lapideum". Caroli a Linné systema naturae per regna tria naturae, secundum classes, ordines, genera, species, cum characteribus, differentiis, synonymis, locis (13th ed.). Leipzig: Georg Emanuel Beer. Note: first description of mellite.
- Vauquelin, Louis (1798). "Sur une nouvell terre tirée de l´aigue marine, ou beril". Observations Sur la Physique, Sur l'Histoire Naturelle et Sur les Arts. 46: 158. Note: René Haüy discovered that emeralds and beryls crystals are geometrically identical. He asked Vauquelin for a chemical analysis, and so Vauquelin found a new "earth" (beryllium oxide).
- Carl Wilhelm Scheele (1742 –1786), discovery of oxygen with Priestley; identification of molybdenum, tungsten, barium, hydrogen, and chlorine.
  - Carl Wilhelm Scheele (1779). "Versuche mit Wasserbley; Molybdaena". Svenska Vetensk. Academ. Handlingar. 40: 238–248. Note: Scheele stated that molybdena was neither galena nor graphite. Peter Jacob Hjelm isolated molybdenum from Scheele's molybdena (1781).
  - Joseph Priestley (13 March 1733 – 6 February 1804), discovery of oxygen with Scheele.
- Jean-Baptiste L. Romé de l'Isle (1783). Cristallographie (2nd ed.). Note: 3 volumes and atlas.
- Carl Abraham Gerhard (1786). Grundriß des Mineralsystems. Himburg. p. 310. Note: based on the Abraham Gottlob Werner's lectures.
- Axel Fredrik Cronstedt (1788). An Essay Towards a System of Mineralogy. London. Note: 2 volumes.
- Christian F. Ludwig (1803). Handbuch der Mineralogie nach A. G. Werner. Leipzig: Siegfried Lebrécht Crusius.
- Jean-Claude de la Métherie (1743–1817):
  - Jean-Claude de la Métherie (1797). Théorie de la Terre (2nd ed.). Paris: Maradan. Note: 5 volumes, it cites René Just Haüy.
  - Jean-Claude de la Métherie (1812). Leçons de minéralogie: données au Collège de France. Paris: Mme. Ve. Courcier. Note: 2 volumes.
- Christian August Siegfried Hoffmann (1760–1813):
  - C. A. S. Hoffmann (1789). "Mineralsystem des Herrn Inspektor Werners mit dessen Erlaubnis herausgegeben von C A S Hoffmann". Bergmännisches Journal. 1. Note: based on the Abraham Gottlob Werner's lectures, as well.
  - C. A. S. Hoffmann (1811). Handbuch der Mineralogie. Freiberg: Craz und Gerlach. Note: years later Breithaupt expanded it (1841).
- Johann Gottfried Schmeisser (1795). A System of Mineralogy: formed chiefly on the plan of Cronstedt.
- Johan Gadolin (5 June 1760 – 15 August 1852), discovery of yttrium (1789).
- Kirwan, Richard (1794–1796). Elements of Mineralogy (2nd ed.). London.
- Dietrich Ludwig Gustav Karsten (1768–1810):
  - Karsten D L G (1789). Des Herrn Nathanael Gottfried Leske hinterlassenes Mineralienkabinett, systematisch geordnet und beschrieben, auch mit vielen wissenschaftlichen Anmerkungen und mehreren äussern Beschreibungen der Fossilien begleitet. Leipzig. Note: mineral collection organized by Nathanael Gottfried Leske and Abraham Gottlob Werner.
  - Estner F J A; Werner A G; Karsten D L G; Leske N G (1790). Frenmüthige Gedanken über Herrn Inspector Werners Berbesserungen in der Mineralogie: nebst einigen Bemerkungen über Herrn Assessor Karstens Beschreibung des vom sel. Leske hinterlassenen Mineralien-Cabinetts. Vienna: Wappler.
  - Karsten D L G (1800). Mineralogische Tabellen. Berlin: Heinrich August Rottmann.
- René Just Haüy (1743–1822): He is "father of modern crystallography".
  - René Just Haüy (1801). Traité de Minéralogie. Note: 5 volumes.
  - René Just Haüy (1822). Traité de Cristallographie. Note: 2 volumes.
- William Gregor (25 December 1761 – 11 June 1817), discovery of titanium (1791).
- Martin Heinrich Klaproth (1 December 1743 – 1 January 1817), discovery of uranium (1789), zirconium (1789); establishment of tellurium, strontium, cerium and chromium.
- Jöns Jacob Berzelius (20 August 1779 – 7 August 1848), discovery of silicon (1824), selenium (1817), thorium (1858), and cerium (1803, with Klaproth).
- John Dalton (1766–1844), British physicist and chemist (Dalton's atomic theory, 1800 and later).
- French physicist André-Marie Ampère (1775–1836) suggests the element fluorine (1810).
- Sir Humphry Davy, 1st Baronet (17 December 1778 – 29 May 1829), discovery of sodium (1807), potassium (1807), calcium (1808), magnesium (1808), boron (1808); isolation of chlorine (1810), barium (1808); identification of aluminium.
- Amedeo Avogadro proposes the Avogadro's law (1811).
- Johann Friedrich Ludwig Hausmann (1813). Handbuch der Mineralogie. Göttingen. Note: 3 volumes.
- Johann Christoph Ullmann (1814). Eine systematisch-tabellarische Uebersicht der mineralogisch-einfachen Fossilien. Kassel and Marburg: Kriedgerschen Buchhandlung.

=== Maxwell, periodic table, electron and mole (after 1815) ===
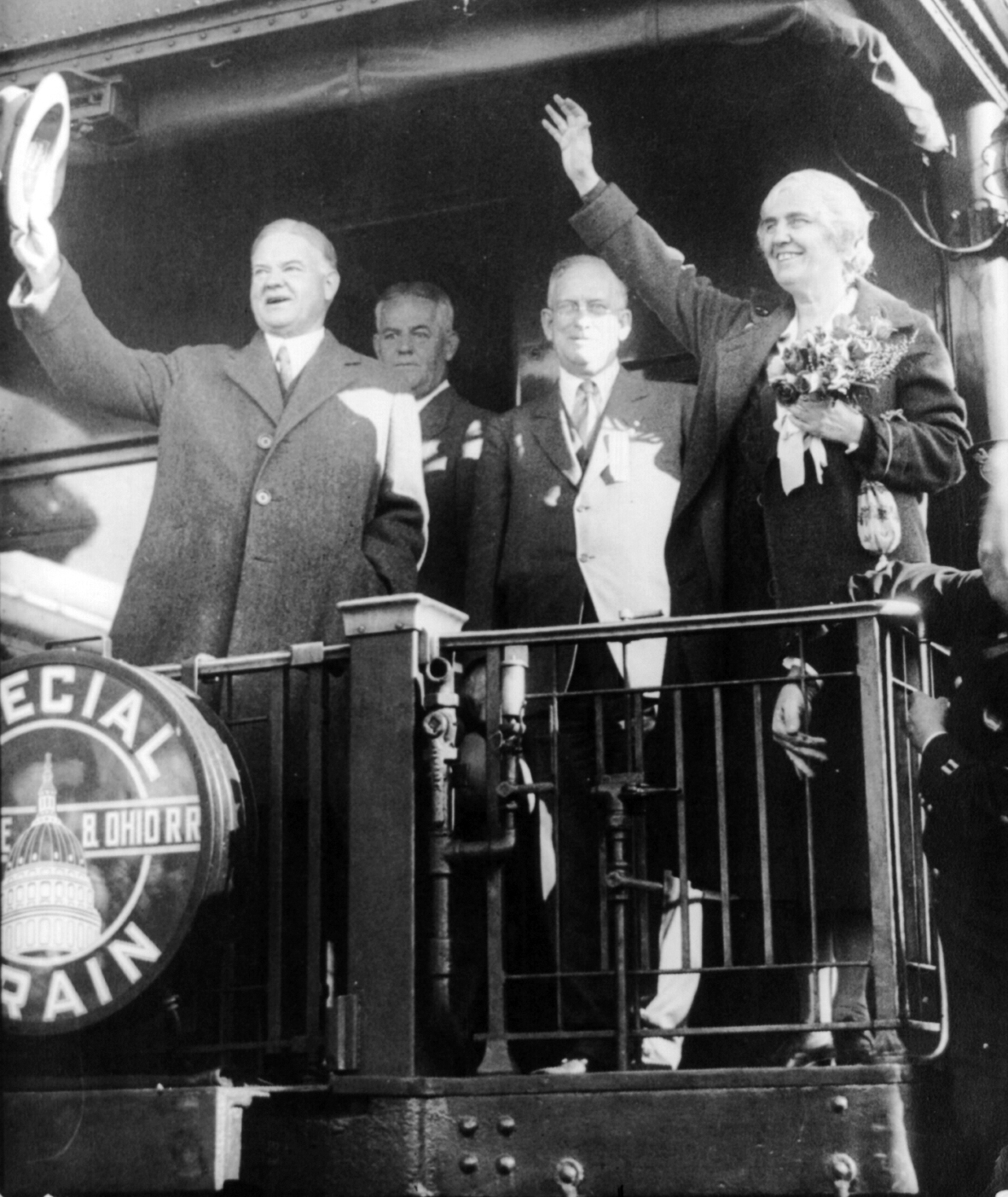
Herbert Hoover and his wife Lou Henry Hoover

- 1828, William Nicol (1770–1851), Scottish geologist and physicist, He invented the Nicol prism, the first device for obtaining plane-polarized light.
- François Sulpice Beudant (1832). Traité Élémentaire de Minéralogie (2nd ed.). Paris.
- Dana, James Dwight (1837). A System of Mineralogy (1st ed.). New Haven. p. 580.
- Heuland, H.; Lévy, A. (1837). Description d'une collection de mineraux, forme par M. Henri Heuland, et appartenant M. Ch. H. Turner, de Rooksnest, dans le comptd de Surrey en Angleterre. London: Adolphe Richter et Compagnie. Note: 3 volumes.
- Johann Friedrich August Breithaupt (16 May 1791 – 22 September 1873):
  - Mohs, Friedrich (1825). Treatise on mineralogy, or, The natural history of the mineral kingdom by Frederick Mohs. Translated by Johann Friedrich August Breithaupt. Edinburgh: Hurst, Robinson. Note: translated from the German, with considerable additions.
  - Johann Friedrich August Breithaupt (1818). Handbuch der Mineralogie von C. A. S. Hoffmann. Freiberg: Craz und Gerlach. Note: 4 volumes.
  - Johann Friedrich August Breithaupt (1841). Vollstaendiges Handbuch der Mineralogie. Note: 4 volumes.
- Jean-Jacques-Nicolas Huot (1841). Nouveau manuel complet de minéralogie, ou tableau de toutes les substances minérales. La librarie encyclopédique de Roret. Notes: 2 volumes, volume 256 of the Encyclopedie Roret [Collection des Manuels]; first description of massicot.
- Wilhelm Karl von Haidinger (1845). Handbuch der bestimmenden Mineralogie. Vienna. Note: Tables (1846).
- Ernst Friedrich Glocker (1793–1858):
  - Glocker E F (1839). Grundriss der Mineralogie mit Einschluss der Geognosie und Petrefactenkunde. Nürnberg: Johann Leonhard Schrag.
  - Glocker E F (1847). Generum et Specierum Mineralium. Secundum Ordines Naturales Digestorum Synopsis. Apud Eduardum Anton.
    - Glocker E F (1847). "Ordo XVIII. Hydrolyti. I. Hydrolyti ametalli. 6. Halites". Generum et Specierum Mineralium. Secundum Ordines Naturales Digestorum Synopsis. Apud Eduardum Anton. pp. 288–304. Note: it redefines rocksalt (a rock) and defines the mineral halite.
- Spectroscopy (c. 1859): Gustav Robert Kirchhoff (1824–1887) and Robert Wilhelm Bunsen (1811–1899)
- Brothers Gustav Rose (1798–1873) and Heinrich Rose (1795–1864), German mineralogists.
- Carl Friedrich Rammelsberg (1813–1899), professor of inorganic chemistry, Berlin University.
- Karlsruhe Congress (3 to 5 September 1860; in a way, the first international meeting of chemists): on the meeting's last day reprints of Stanislao Cannizzaro's (1826–1910, chemistry professor of Genoa) paper on atomic weights (1858), in which he utilized earlier work by Amedeo Avogadro, were distributed. This definition on atoms and molecules made the efforts by Dmitri Ivanovich Mendeleev and Julius Lothar Meyer (1830–1895) on the periodic table of elements, possible. The concept of atoms and molecules were known, but after the Congress the Avogadro-Ampère theory became accepted.
- Maxwell's equations (1861–1864).
  - The four pillars of physics: Isaac Newton (1642–1726/27), James Maxwell (1831–1879), Max Planck (1858–1947) and Albert Einstein (1879–1955).
- Dmitri Ivanovich Mendeleev (8 February 1834 – 2 February 1907), periodic table (1869), with less than 70 elements in 1871.
  - Paul Emile Lecoq de Boisbaudran finds eka-aluminium (gallium, 1875), samarium (1879) and dysprosium (1886); Jean Charles Galissard de Marignac finds ytterbium (1878) and gadolinium (1880–1886, with P.E.L. de Boisbaudran); Marc Delafontaine, Jacques-Louis Soret and Per Teodor Cleve discover holmium (1878–79); Lars Fredrik Nilson finds eka-boron (scandium, 1879); Carl Auer von Welsbach finds praseodymium and neodymium (1885) and Clemens Winkler finds eka-silicon (germanium, 1886).
- Auguste Bravais (1811–1863): Bravais lattices (1850).
- Friedrich August Kekulé von Stradonitz (also August Kekulé) (1829–1896): description of the carbon bonds in organic compounds (1857/72).
- Ludwig Boltzmann (1844–1906), Maxwell–Boltzmann distribution (1871).
- Adam G J (1869). Tableau Minéralogique. Libraire des Corps Impériaux des Ponts et Chaussées et des Mines. Paris: Dunod.
  - Adam G J (1869). "Tableau Minéralogique". Annales des mines: Ou recueil de mémoires sur l'exploitation des mines et sur les sciences qui s'y rapportent. 15.
- Karl Harry Ferdinand Rosenbusch (1892). Mikroskopische Physiographie der Petrographisch Wichtigen Mineralien. Stuttgart: E.Schweizerbart'sche Verlagshandlung (E. Koch).
- Paul Heinrich von Groth (1843–1927) suggests the possibility that spherical atoms (Dalton's atomic theory) reside at equivalent positions of space lattices (1888).
- Leonhard Sohncke (1842–1897): Sohncke's space groups (1876).
- Albert Huntington Chester (1896). A Dictionary of the Names of Minerals (1 ed.). London: Chapman & Hall.
- Emil Wiechert and Joseph John Thomson characterise the electron (1897).
- Henry Clifton Sorby (1826–1908), an English microscopist and geologist. His major contribution was the development of techniques for studying iron and steel with microscopes.
- Albert Einstein (1879–1955), "annus mirabilis" papers (1906).
- Wilhelm Ostwald (1853–1932) defines the mole, he received the Nobel Prize for Chemistry (1909). He, Jacobus Henricus van 't Hoff (1852–1911), and Svante Arrhenius (1859–1927) are usually credited with being the modern founders of the field of physical chemistry.
- Max von Laue (1879–1960): diffraction of X-rays by crystals (1912).
- Arthur Moritz Schoenflies (1853–1928) und Evgraf Fedorov (1853–1919): characterisation of all 230 crystal space groups (1890/91).
- William Lawrence Bragg (1890–1971) and William Henry Bragg (1862–1942): law on the diffraction of X-rays by crystals (1912). They are Nobel Prize for Physics laureates (1915).
- 1912, Herbert Hoover (1874–1964; 31st President of the United States, 1929–1933) and his wife Lou Henry Hoover (1874–1944) translate George Agricola's De Re Metallica to English. Note: many mining expressions/words were Mediaeval German expressions, these expressions/words did not exist in Classical Latin.
- Henry G. J. Moseley (1887–1915), Moseley's law (1913).

=== 100 years 'American Mineralogist' (after 1915) ===
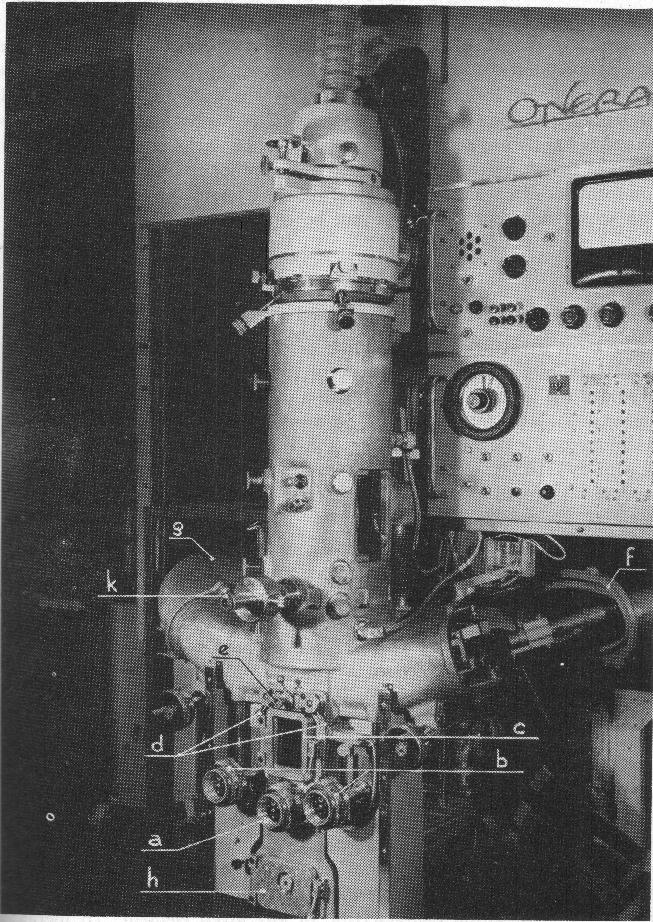
Prototype of the electron microprobe of Castaing, built by ONERA and duplicated by 'Cameca Science & Metrology Solutions' as MS85

- January 1916, scientific journal: American Mineralogist, first issue.
- 1916, X-ray powder diffraction: "Peter Debye (1884–1966) – Paul Scherrer (1890–1969) powder method".
- 1919, founding of the Mineralogical Society of America (MSA).
- Georg Menzer (1897–1989) solves the first crystal structure of garnet (1925).
- 1926, around 1,500 mineral species were firmly established at that time, the Roebling mineral collection (nowadays at the National Museum of Natural History, Smithsonian Institution, Washington, DC) lacked less than 15 of those (Colonel Washington A. Roebling (1837–1926), founding member of the Mineralogical Society of America).
- Carl Hintze (1851–1916): "Handbuch der Mineralogie" (1916) Leipzig: Veit.
- The structure of silicates:
  - Machatschki, Felix (1928). "Zur Frage der Struktur und Konstitution der Feldspate". Centralblatt für Mineralogie, Geologie und Paläontologie (in German). A: 96–104. Note: Felix Machatschki worked with Victor Goldschmidt as well as with William L. Bragg for a period of time.
  - William L. Bragg (1930). "The Structure of Silicates". Nature. 125 (3152): 510–511. Bibcode:1930Natur.125..510B. doi:10.1038/125510a0.
  - William L. Bragg (1932). The Structure of Silicates (2nd ed.). Leipzig: Akademische Verlagsgesellschaft m.b.H.
  - Gossner, B.; Strunz, H. (1932). "Über strukturelle Beziehungen zwischen Phosphaten (Triphylin) und Silikaten (Olivin) und über die chemische Zusammensetzung von Ardennit". Zeitschrift für Kristallographie – Crystalline Materials (in German). 83 (1–6): 415–421. doi:10.1524/zkri.1932.83.1.415. S2CID 102235224.
  - Strunz, Hugo (1936). Über die Verwandtschaft der Silikate mit den Phosphaten und Arsenaten (PhD Thesis) (in German). Akad. Verlagsges.
  - Berman, Harry (1936). Constitution and classification of the natural silicates (PhD Thesis). Harvard University.
- Victor Moritz Goldschmidt (1888–1947) founder of crystal chemistry: Goldschmidt classification (1937), Goldschmidt tolerance factor and Goldschmidt's law (1926). He is considered together with Vladimir Vernadsky (1863–1945) to be the founder of modern geochemistry.
- 1941, foundation of the Joint Committee on Powder Diffraction Standards (JCPDS).
- Ramdohr, Paul; Strunz, Hugo (1978). Klockmanns Lehrbuch der Mineralogie (in German) (16th ed.). Ferdinand Enke.
- Strunz, Hugo (1941). Mineralogische Tabellen (in German) (1st ed.). Leipzig: Akad. Verlagsges. p. 287.
- Palache, Charles; Berman, Harry; Frondel, Clifford (1944). The System of Mineralogy of James Dwight Dana and Edward Salisbury Dana. Vol. I: Elements, Sulfides, Sulfosalts, Oxides (7th ed.). Wiley & Sons. p. 834.
- 7 April 1947, International Union of Crystallography (IUCr) was formally admitted to International Council for Science (ICSU) (former International Council of Scientific Unions, ICSU).
- In 1948–1950, PhD candidate Raymond Castaing (1921–1999), supervised by André Guinier, built the first "microsonde électronique" (electron microprobe) at ONERA.
  - Castaing, Raimond (1952) [Submitted 1951]. Application des sondes électroniques à une méthode d'analyse ponctuelle chimique et cristallographique [Application of electron probes to local chemical and crystallographic analysis] (PhD Thesis) (in French). University of Paris. Publication Office national d'études et de recherches aéronautiques (ONERA) [Institute for Aeronautical Research] Nr. 55
- 1955, Mark C. Bandy (1900–1963) and his wife Jean A. Bandy (1900–1991) translate George Agricola's De Natura Fossilium to English.
- Max Hutchinson Hey (1904–1984); British Museum, London.

==== International Mineralogical Association period (after 1957) ====
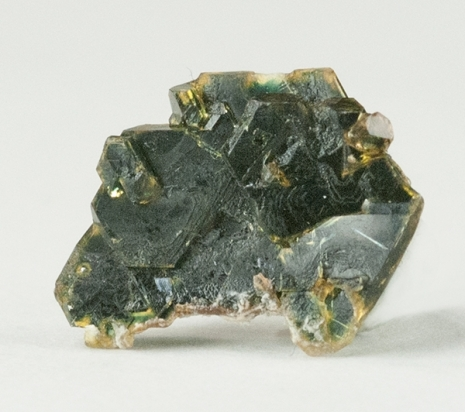
Iowaite (IMA1967-002). Size: 1.4 cm x 0.9 cm x 0.2 cm. Locality: Palabora mine, Loolekop, Phalaborwa, Limpopo Province, South Africa.

- 1958, foundation of the International Mineralogical Association (IMA), Commission on New Minerals and Mineral Names (CNMMN). It is affiliated to the International Union of Geological Sciences (IUGS).
- Frondel, Clifford (1962). The System of Mineralogy of James Dwight Dana and Edward Salisbury Dana. Vol. III: Silica Minerals (7th ed.). John Wiley and Sons Incorporated. p. 334. Note: this publication got delayed, as silicate minerals were being better understood.
- Deer, William Alexander; Howie, Robert Andrew; Zussman, Jack (1962). An Introduction to the Rock-Forming Minerals (1st ed.). Longmans. p. 528. Note: main work is a series with 11 volumes (as of 2013).
- Michael Fleischer's "Alphabetical Index of New Mineral Names, Discredited Minerals, and Changes of Mineralogical Nomenclature, Volumes 1–50 (1916–1965), The American Mineralogist" (1966). Note: "Glossary of Mineral Species" (1971) 1 ed. is based on it.
- 3rd International Molecular Sieve Conference (1973): organisation of the International Zeolite Association (IZA).
- Povarennykh, A.S. (1972). Crystal Chemical Classification of Minerals. New York, NY: Plenum Press. ISBN 978-0-306-30348-7.
- 1978, Joint Committee on Powder Diffraction Standards (JCPDS) is renamed International Centre for Diffraction Data (ICDD). A lot of compounds have an 'ICDD Card'.
- Klein, Cornelis; Hurlbut, Cornelius S. Jr. (1985). Manual of Mineralogy (20th ed.). John Wiley. pp. 352–353. ISBN 0-471-80580-7.
- Anthony, John W.; Bideaux; Bladh; Nichols, eds. (1990–2013). Handbook of Mineralogy. Chantilly, VA: Mineralogical Society of America.
- Criddle, Alan J.; Stanley, Chris J. (1993). Quantitative Data File for Ore Minerals (3 ed.). London: Chapman and Hall. ISBN 978-94-011-1486-8.
- 25 December 1993, beginning of the MinDat database; it goes online in October 2000.
- International Mineralogical Association's (IMA) zeolite group and International Zeolite Association's (IZA) zeolite frameworks have similarities (1997).
- Jeffrey G. Weissman and Anthony J. Nikischer (1999). Photographic Guide to Mineral Species. Excalibur Mineral Company. Note: webmineral.com's database.
- Jeffrey de Fourestier (1999). Glossary of Mineral Synonyms. Special Publication 2. The Canadian Mineralogist.

==== IMA Master List of Valid Minerals period (after 1999) ====
- 2001, Mineralienatlas database goes online.
- Strunz, Hugo; Nickel, Ernest H. (2001). Strunz Mineralogical Tables (9th ed.). Stuttgart: Schweizerbart. p. 870. ISBN 978-3-510-65188-7.
- Bernard Elgey Leake (born 1932), Frank Christopher Hawthorne (born 1946) and Roberta Oberti (born 1952): classification of amphiboles, mainly (1978–2012).
- Rruff Project, prof. Robert (Bob) Downs, Mineralogy and Crystallography, Department of Geosciences, University of Arizona, funded in part by Michael Scott.
- 19th General Meeting of IMA, Kobe, Japan (July 2006).
  - The merging of the Commission on New Minerals and Mineral Names (CNMMN) and the Commission on Classification of Minerals (CCM) resulted in the Commission on New Minerals, Nomenclature and Classification (CNMNC).
  - It was decided to create a website presenting the "official" IMA list of minerals.
- Nickel E H, Nichols M C (2007) IMA/CNMNC list of mineral names compiled by Ernest H. Nickel & Monte C. Nichols supplied through the courtesy of Materials Data, Inc.: it updates the Nickel-Strunz 9 ed mineral identifiers, with this publication the mineral database had increased from less than 3,000 to over 4,000 mineral species. Mainly through the work of Ernest Henry Nickel, Monte C. Nichols and Dorian G.W. Smith. The mineral list on the Rruff Project website was built up with the IMA/CNMNC list of mineral names (March 2007).
- Robert M. Hazen, summary of mineral evolution in the geologic time context (2008).
- October 2008: Erika Pohl-Ströher donates her mineral collection to the "TU Bergakademie Freiberg", Freudenstein Castle, "terra mineralia" permanent exhibition.
- Back, Malcolm E.; Mandarino, Joseph A.; Fleischer, Michael (2008). Fleischer's Glossary of Mineral Species (10th ed.). Tucson AZ: Mineralogical Record Inc. p. 346. Note: tetrarooseveltite (β-Bi(AsO_{4}), an arsenate mineral) is a member of the scheelite mineral group (a sulfate group).
  - Moëlo et al. (2008) "Sulfosalt systematics: a review", sulfosalt minerals are redefined.
- Nickel E H, Nichols M C (2009) IMA/CNMNC list of mineral names compiled by Ernest H. Nickel & Monte C. Nichols supplied through the courtesy of Materials Data, Inc.
- Mills, Stuart J.; Hatert, Frédéric; Nickel, Ernest H.; Ferraris, Giovanni (2009). "The standardisation of mineral group hierarchies: application to recent nomenclature proposals" (PDF). European Journal of Mineralogy. 21 (5): 1073–1080. Bibcode:2009EJMin..21.1073M. doi:10.1127/0935-1221/2009/0021-1994. hdl:2268/29163. Archived from the original (PDF) on 17 February 2011. Mineral group (strict sense) is redefined.
- 'The IMA Master List' (November 2012): redefinition of amphibole minerals.

=== After 100 years 'American Mineralogist' (after 2015) ===
- Highlights:
  - Polyoxometalates (POMs): heteropolymolybdates (betpakdalites), polyniobates (menezesites), polytungstates, arsenovanadates.
  - Polysomatic series, e.g.: alnaperbøeite-(Ce) – perbøeite-(Ce) series, palygorskite – sepiolite series and epidote – törnebohmite series.
  - Microporous minerals.
  - Valid minerals with water as ligand (coordinative form), some even with crystallization water: polyphosphates, decavanadates, uranyl sulfates, tobermorites, titanium disilicates, pyrochlores, tellurium oxysalts, etc. E.g.: afmite, alunogen, bettertonite, ianbruceite, liskeardite, matulaite, penberthycroftite, schmidite, tvrdýite.
- IMA Master List (March 2017), great mineral supergroups: alunites (IMA2010 s.p.), apatites (IMA2010 s.p.), pyrochlores (betafite, elsmoreite, microlite, pyrochlore and roméite groups; IMA2010 s.p.), tourmalines (IMA2011 s.p.), amphiboles (IMA2012 s.p.), hydrotalcites (IMA2012 s.p.), garnets (IMA2013 s.p.), hollandites (coronadite and priderite groups; IMA2013 s.p.), epidotes (IMA2016 s.p.), perovskites (IMA2016 s.p.) and seidozerites (titanium disilicates, IMA2016 s.p.).
- IMA Master List (March 2017), mineral groups and supergroups sharing the same name: sapphirines (aenigmatite, rhönite and sapphirine groups; IMA2008 s.p.), pharmacosiderites (ivanyukite, pharmacoalumite and pharmacosiderite groups; Rumsey et al., 2010), betpakdalites (betpakdalite, mendozavilite and obradovicite; IMA2012 s.p.), gadolinites (datolite, gadolinite and herderite groups; IMA2016-A), dumortierites (dumortierite, holtite and szklaryite groups; IMA2013 s.p.), mayenites (mayenite and wadalite groups; IMA2013-C), chevkinites (chevkinite and perrierite groups; Macdonald et al., 2012), högbomites (högbomite, nigerite and taaffeite groups; IMA2009 s.p.), labuntsovites (IMA2009 s.p.).

=== Beginnings of the 'IMA Master List of Minerals' ===
- Strunz, Hugo (1982). Mineralogische Tabellen (in German) (8th ed.). Leipzig: Akademische Verlagsgesellschaft Geest u. Portig. p. 621.
- James A. Ferraiolo (1982) "Systematic Classification of Nonsilicate Minerals", Bulletin 172, American Museum of Natural History (AMNH). Note: the Bulletin 172 was used to update the Dana (7 ed) IDs. The Nickel-Strunz (10 ed) IDs on webmineral.com are partially from his collaboration.
- John W. Anthony, Richard A. Bideaux, Kenneth W. Bladh, and Monte C. Nichols, Eds., Handbook of Mineralogy (HOM), Mineralogical Society of America (MSA), Chantilly, VA 20151-1110, US.
- Nickel, E. H.; Nichols, M. C. (1991). Mineral Reference Manual. New York: Van Nostrand, Reinhold. p. 250.
- James Dwight Dana; Edward Salisbury Dana; Richard V. Gaines; H. Catherine W. Skinner; Eugene E. Foord; Brian Mason; Abraham Rosenzweig (1997). Dana's new mineralogy: the system of mineralogy of James Dwight Dana and Edward Salisbury Dana (8th ed.). Wiley. p. 1872. ISBN 978-0-471-19310-4.
- Strunz, Hugo; Nickel, Ernest H. (2001). Strunz Mineralogical Tables (9th ed.). Stuttgart: Schweizerbart. p. 870. ISBN 978-3-510-65188-7.
- Ernest Nickel & Monte Nichols. Mineral Names, Redefinitions & Discreditations Passed by the CNMMN of the IMA (ARD List of Minerals, 2002), updated 2004 (Burke, 2006). Abbreviation (ARD): approved (A), revalidated (R) and discredited minerals (D).
- 19th General Meeting of IMA, Kobe, Japan (July 2006): it was decided to create a website presenting the "official" IMA list of minerals.
- Burke E A J (2006). "A mass discreditation of GQN minerals" (PDF). The Canadian Mineralogist. 44 (6): 1557–1560. Bibcode:2006CaMin..44.1557B. doi:10.2113/gscanmin.44.6.1557. Abbreviation (GQN): grandfathered (G), questionable (Q) and published without approval minerals. Note: questionable minerals that could not be discredited got grandfathered as well.
- Rruff.info/IMA database is built up based on 'IMA/CNMNC List of Mineral Names' compiled by Ernest H. Nickel & Monte C. Nichols (March 2007), courtesy of Minerals Data, Inc. This list is the result of the GQN list and the ARD list.
  - Buserite's status is 'approved' (IMA1970-024): Burns, R G; Burns, V E; Stockman, H W (1983). "A review of the todorokite-buserite problem: implications to the mineralogy of marine manganese nodules". American Mineralogist. 68: 972–980.
- Ernest H. Nickel; Monte C. Nichols (March 2009). IMA/CNMNC List of Mineral Names. Archived from the original (PDF) on 26 June 2013. Courtesy of Minerals Data, Inc.; is released.
  - Orthochamosite is discredited: Bayliss, P (1975). "Nomenclature of the trioctahedral chlorites". The Canadian Mineralogist. 13: 178–180.
- 'The New IMA List of Minerals' is released (2011/ September 2012). Note: the CNMNC revised the 'ARD List of minerals', reducing the number of grandfathered minerals.
  - 'Metauranocircite II' gets dumped: Locock A J; Burns P C; Flynn T M (2005). "Structures of strontium- and barium-dominant compounds that contain the autunite-type sheet". The Canadian Mineralogist. 43 (2): 721–733. doi:10.2113/gscanmin.43.2.721., Locock A J; Burns P C; Flynn T M (2005). "Divalent transition metals and magnesium in structures that contain the autunite-type sheet: errata". The Canadian Mineralogist. 43: 847–849. doi:10.2113/gscanmin.43.2.721.
- Note: nowadays, there are more or less hundred new minerals every year (it was made possible by the 'IMA Master List of Minerals' as reference).

== Handbooks on mineralogy/ petrology ==
=== The System of Mineralogy of James D. Dana ===
- Dana, James Dwight (1837). A System of Mineralogy (1 ed.). New Haven. 580 pages.
- Dana, James Dwight (1844). A System of Mineralogy (2 ed.). New York and London. 640 pages.
- Dana, James Dwight (1850). A System of Mineralogy (3 ed.). New York and London. 711 pages.
- Dana, James Dwight (1854). A System of Mineralogy (4 ed.). New York and London.
  - Note: 2 volumes; Vol. I, 320 pages and Vol. II, 534 pages. It uses for the first time a chemical classification system (elements, sulfides, oxides, silicates, and so on).
- Dana, James Dwight; Brush, George Jarvis (1868). A System of Mineralogy: Descriptive mineralogy, comprising the most recent discoveries (5 ed.). New York: J. Wiley & Sons, Inc. 827 pages.
- Dana, James Dwight; Dana, Edward Salisbury (1892). The System of Mineralogy of James D. Dana: Descriptive Mineralogy (6 ed.). New York: J. Wiley & Sons, Inc. 1134 pages.
  - James Dwight Dana; Edward Salisbury Dana (1899) First appendix to the sixth edition of Dana's System of mineralogy : Completing the work to 1899, 75 pages.
  - James Dwight Dana; Edward Salisbury Dana; William E Ford (1914) Second appendix to the sixth edition of Dana's System of mineralogy : Completing the work to 1909, 114 pages.
  - William Ebenezer Ford; James Dwight Dana (1915) Third appendix to the sixth edition of Dana's System of mineralogy : Completing the work to 1915, 87 pages.
- Palache, Charles; Berman, Harry; Frondel, Clifford (1951). The System of Mineralogy of James Dwight Dana and Edward Salisbury Dana (7 ed.). Wiley & Sons. Note: 3 volumes; Vol. I (1944), 834 pages, Vol. II (1951), 1124 pages, Vol. III (Silica Minerals, Clifford Frondel, 1962), 334 pages.
- James Dwight Dana; Edward Salisbury Dana; Richard V. Gaines; H. Catherine W. Skinner; Eugene E. Foord; Brian Mason; Abraham Rosenzweig (1997). Dana's new mineralogy: the system of mineralogy of James Dwight Dana and Edward Salisbury Dana (8 ed.). Wiley. ISBN 978-0-471-19310-4. 1872 pages. Note: a more compact edition.

=== Glossary of Mineral Species ===
- Fleischer, Michael (1966). "Index of New Mineral Names, Discredited Minerals, and Changes of Mineralogical Nomenclature in Volumes 1–50 of The American Mineralogist in Table 1. Alphabetical Index of New Mineral Names, Discredited Minerals, and Changes of Mineralogical Nomenclature, Volumes 1–50 (1916–1965), The American Mineralogist". American Mineralogist. 51 (8): 1251–1326.
- Fleischer, Michael (1971). Glossary of Mineral Species (1 ed.). Tucson AZ: Mineralogical Record.
- Fleischer, Michael (1975). Glossary of Mineral Species (2 ed.). Tucson AZ: Mineralogical Record.
- Fleischer, Michael (1980). Glossary of Mineral Species (3 ed.). Tucson AZ: Mineralogical Record.
- Fleischer, Michael (1983). Glossary of Mineral Species (4 ed.). Tucson AZ: Mineralogical Record.
- Fleischer, Michael (1987). Glossary of Mineral Species (5 ed.). Tucson AZ: Mineralogical Record.
- Michael, Fleischer; Mandarino, Joseph A. (1991). Glossary of Mineral Species (6 ed.). Tucson AZ: Mineralogical Record Inc.
- Michael, Fleischer; Mandarino, Joseph A. (1995). Glossary of Mineral Species (7 ed.). Tucson AZ: Mineralogical Record Inc.
- Mandarino, Joseph A. (1999). Fleischer's Glossary of Mineral Species (8 ed.). Tucson AZ: Mineralogical Record Inc.
- Back, Malcolm E.; Mandarino, Joseph A. (2004). Fleischer's Glossary of Mineral Species (9 ed.). Tucson AZ: Mineralogical Record Inc. Note: no mineral groups section in this edition.
- Back, Malcolm E.; Mandarino, Joseph A. (2008). Fleischer's Glossary of Mineral Species (10 ed.). Tucson AZ: Mineralogical Record Inc.
- Back, Malcolm E. (2014). Fleischer's Glossary of Mineral Species (11 ed.). Tucson AZ: Mineralogical Record Inc.
- Back, Malcolm E. (2018). Fleischer's Glossary of Mineral Species (12 ed.). Tucson AZ: Mineralogical Record Inc.

=== Strunz Mineralogical Tables ===
- Strunz, Hugo (1941). Mineralogische Tabellen (in German) (1 ed.). Leipzig: Akad. Verlagsges.
- Strunz, Hugo (1949). Mineralogische Tabellen (in German) (2 ed.). Leipzig: Akademische Verlagsgesellschaft Geest u. Portig.
- Strunz, Hugo (1957). Mineralogische Tabellen (in German) (3 ed.). Leipzig: Akademische Verlagsgesellschaft Geest u. Portig.
- Strunz, Hugo (1966). Mineralogische Tabellen (in German) (4 ed.). Leipzig: Akademische Verlagsgesellschaft Geest u. Portig.
- Strunz, Hugo; Tennyson, Christel (1970). Mineralogische Tabellen (in German) (5 ed.). Leipzig: Akademische Verlagsgesellschaft Geest u. Portig.
  - Strunz, Hugo; Tennyson, Christel (1977). Mineralogische Tabellen (in German) (6 ed.). Leipzig: Akademische Verlagsgesellschaft Geest u. Portig. Note: corrected edition.
  - Strunz, Hugo; Tennyson, Christel (1978). Mineralogische Tabellen (in German) (7 ed.). Leipzig: Akad. Verlagsges. Note: reprint.
- Strunz, Hugo (1982). Mineralogische Tabellen (in German) (8 ed.). Leipzig: Akademische Verlagsgesellschaft Geest u. Portig.
- Strunz, Hugo; Nickel, Ernest H. (2001). Strunz Mineralogical Tables (9 ed.). Stuttgart: Schweizerbart. ISBN 978-3-510-65188-7.

=== Rock-Forming Minerals series ===
- W.A. Deer; R.A. Howie; J. Zussman (2013). An Introduction to the Rock-Forming Minerals (3 ed.). London: Mineralogical Society. ISBN 978-0-903056-27-4.
- W.A. Deer; R.A. Howie; J. Zussman (3 December 2001). Orthosilicates. Rock-Forming Minerals. Vol. 1A. Geological Society of London. ISBN 978-1-897799-88-8.
- W.A. Deer; R.A. Howie; J. Zussman (3 December 2001). Disilicates and Ring Silicates. Rock-Forming Minerals. Vol. 1B. Geological Society of London. ISBN 978-1-897799-89-5.
- W.A. Deer; R.A. Howie; J. Zussman (3 December 2001). Single-Chain Silicates. Rock-Forming Minerals. Vol. 2A. Geological Society of London. ISBN 978-1-897799-85-7.
- W.A. Deer; R.A. Howie; J. Zussman (28 August 1997). Double Chain Silicates. Rock-Forming Minerals. Vol. 2B. Geological Society of London. ISBN 978-1-897799-77-2.
- M.E. Fleet (23 February 2004). Micas. Rock-Forming Minerals. Vol. 3A. Geological Society of London. ISBN 978-1-86239-142-0.
- W.A. Deer; R.A. Howie; J. Zussman (6 March 2009). Layered Silicates Excluding Micas and Clay Minerals. Rock Forming Minerals. Vol. 3B. Geological Society of London. ISBN 978-1-86239-259-5.
- M.J. Wilson (31 May 2013). Clay Minerals. Rock Forming Minerals. Vol. 3C. Geological Society of London. ISBN 978-1-86239-359-2.
- W.A. Deer; R.A. Howie; J. Zussman (6 June 2001). Framework Silicates - Feldspars. Rock-Forming Minerals. Vol. 4A. Geological Society of London. ISBN 978-1-86239-081-2.
- W.A. Deer; R.A. Howie; J. Zussman; W.S. Wise (18 May 2004). Framework Silicates - Silica Minerals, Feldspathoids and Zeolites. Rock-Forming Minerals. Vol. 4B. Geological Society of London. ISBN 978-1-86239-144-4.
- W.A. Deer; R.A. Howie; J. Zussman; J.F.W. Bowles; D.J. Vaughan (16 June 2011). Non-Silicates: Oxides, Hydroxides and Sulphides. Rock-Forming Minerals. Vol. 5A. Geological Society of London. ISBN 978-1-86239-315-8.
- W.A. Deer; R.A. Howie; J. Zussman; L.L.Y. Chang (1 January 1996). Non-Silicates: Sulphates, Carbonates, Phosphates, Halides. Rock-Forming Minerals. Vol. 5B. Geological Society of London. ISBN 978-1-897799-90-1.

=== Carl Friedrich Rammelsberg series ===
- C.F. Rammelsberg (1841). Handwörterbuch des chemischen Theils der Mineralogie. Vol. 1–2. Berlin: C. G. Lüderitz.
  - Erstes Supplement zu dem Handwörterbuch des chemischen Theils der Mineralogie (1843), Zweites Supplement zu dem Handwörterbuch des chemischen Theils der Mineralogie (1845), Drittes Supplement zu dem Handwörterbuch des chemischen Theils der Mineralogie (1847), Viertes Supplement zu dem Handwörterbuch des chemischen Theils der Mineralogie (1849) and Fünftes Supplement zu dem Handwörterbuch des chemischen Theils der Mineralogie (1853).
  - C.F. Rammelsberg (1843). Supplement zu dem Handwörterbuch des chemischen Theils der Mineralogie. Vol. 1–4. Berlin: C. G. Lüderitz.
- C.F. Rammelsberg (1860). Handbuch der Mineralchemie. Leipzig: Wilhelm Engelmann. pp. 1038.
  - C.F. Rammelsberg (1886). Handbuch der Mineralchemie: Ergänzungsheft zur 2en Aufl.

=== Carl Hintze ===
- Hintze, Carl (1897–1933). Handbuch der Mineralogie. Berlin and Leipzig. Note: 6 volumes.
- Carl Hintze (1958). Handbuch der Mineralogie / Ergänzungsbände I, II, Neue Mineralien und neue Mineralnamen. Berlin: Walter de Gruyter & Co.
- Carl Hintze; Karl F Chudoba (1971). Handbuch der Mineralogie / Gesamtregister für die Bände I(1–4) und II sowie Ergänzungsbände I, II und III. Berlin: Walter de Gruyter & Co.
- Carl Hintze; Karl F Chudoba (1974). Handbuch der Mineralogie: Neue Mineralien und neue Mineralnamen. Suppl. 4. Berlin: Walter de Gruyter & Co. ISBN 978-3-11-004636-6.
- Carl Hintze; Karl F Chudoba (1975). Handbuch der Mineralogie. Erg.-Bd. 4: Lfg. 2. Neue Mineralien und neue Mineralnamen: (mit Nachträgen, Richtigstellungen und Ergänzungen). Berlin: Walter de Gruyter & Co. p. 373. ISBN 978-3-11-005850-5.
- Carl Hintze, Karl F Chudoba (1968 and 2011). Handbuch der Mineralogie : Ergänzungsband III: Neue Mineralien und neue Mineralnamen (mit Nachträgen, Richtigstellungen und Ergänzungen). Berlin: Walter de Gruyter & Co. Note: digital file.

=== Handbook for chemists and physicists (D'Ans Lax) ===
- Jean D'Ans; Ellen Lax (1943). Taschenbuch für Chemiker und Physiker (1 ed.). Note: 3 volumes.
- M. D. Lechner, ed. (1992). Taschenbuch für Chemiker und Physiker: Physikalisch-chemische Daten. Vol. 1 (4 ed.). Berlin: Springer. ISBN 3-540-52895-4.
- Claudia Synowietz, ed. (1983). Taschenbuch für Chemiker und Physiker: Organische Verbindungen. Vol. 2 (4 ed.). Berlin: Springer. ISBN 3-540-12263-X.
- Roger Blachnik, ed. (1998). Taschenbuch für Chemiker und Physiker: Elemente, anorganische Verbindungen und Materialien, Minerale. Vol. 3 (4 ed.). Berlin: Springer. ISBN 3-540-60035-3.

=== Max H. Hey ===
- Max H. Hey (1955). An Index of Mineral Species & Varieties Arranged Chemically (2 ed.). printed by order of the Trustees of the British Museum (London). ISBN 978-0-565-00097-4.
- Max H. Hey; Peter G. Embrey (1974). An index of mineral species and varieties arranged chemically: with an alphabetical index of accepted names and synonyms. A second appendix to the second edition of 'An index of mineral species and varieties arranged chemically'. London: Trustees of the British Museum (Natural History).
- Clark, Andrew M. (1993). Hey's mineral index: mineral species, varieties, and synonyms (3 ed.). London; New York: Chapman & Hall. ISBN 978-0-412-39950-3.

== See also ==
- History of mineralogy
- List of minerals
- List of minerals named after people
- List of minerals recognized by the International Mineralogical Association
