= Agrell =

Agrell is a surname. Notable people with this surname include:

- Johan Agrell (1701–1765), Swedish composer
- Alfhild Agrell (1849–1923), Swedish writer
- Sigurd Agrell (1881–1937), Swedish poet, translator, and runologist
- Stuart Olof Agrell (1913–1996), English geologist
