= DHZ =

DHZ can refer to:

- An Introduction to the Rock-Forming Minerals, a mineralogy textbook
- People's Republic of Da Han Zhong, in the video game series Front Mission
- Decihertz, a unit of frequency
- Dalian Hi-tech Zone, an industrial district in Dalian, Liaoning province, China
