= Jack Zussman =

British crystallographer and mineralogist (1924–2024)

- Born: 31 July 1924; London, England
- Died: 30 August 2024 (aged 100)
- Education: Downing College, Cambridge (B.A., PhD)
- Known for: Deer, Howie and Zussman, An Introduction to the Rock-Forming Minerals
- Scientific career
- Fields: Crystallography and mineralogy
- Workplaces: University of Manchester 1952–1962, 1967–1989; University of Oxford 1962–1966

Jack Zussman (31 July 1924 – 30 August 2024) was a British crystallographer and mineralogist. He was professor of geology and head of the department of geology at the University of Manchester from 1967 to 1989. He is best known for his co-authorship of a series of reference books that summarise the physical, chemical and optical properties of the rock forming minerals that were published between 1962 and 2013, which are widely known as Deer, Howie and Zussman or DHZ.

== Early life ==
Zussman was born in London in 1924, and lived in east London. He went to school at Coopers' Company's school in Bow. In 1939, he was evacuated to Frome in Somerset, where he lived and finished his schooling. He was called up for military service in 1943. Zussman served with the Royal Navy as a radar mechanic on HMS Caesar. His service included escorting convoys to Arctic ports of the Soviet Union, for which he was later awarded the Ushakov medal and the Arctic Star. Once the war ended, he took up a place at Downing College, Cambridge to study physics.

== Career ==
Zussman began his work on crystallography during a PhD at the University of Cambridge, where he was based at the Cavendish Laboratories. He published several early papers on the structure of nucleotides, with chemist Alex Todd, and amino acids. In 1952, he took up a position in mineralogy and crystallography, in the geology department at the University of Manchester. He began working on the structure of silicate minerals, including the amphiboles and serpentine group minerals.

In 1962, he was appointed reader in mineralogy at the University of Oxford, where he was also fellow of St Cross College, Oxford from 1965 to 1967. Zussman returned to Manchester to take up the Chair of Geology and post of head of department in 1967. Zussman remained as head of department for 22 years, until his retirement in 1989. In 1969, Zussman was one of a few scientists who had access to some of the newly collected samples of moon rock for research investigations. One moon rock sample was placed on display in a museum in Manchester for a week, just two months after being collected by Neil Armstrong. Later, Zussman recalled overhearing a visitor say ‘I’ve seen something like that in our grate’ on seeing the dark and bubbly samples of lunar lava.

The mineral zussmanite was named in his honour in 1964 by mineralogist Stuart Agrell.

Zussman was dean of the faculty of science at Manchester from 1980 to 1981, and president of the Mineralogical Society from 1980 to 1981. In 1982, he was one of the founder members of the British Crystallographic Association.

In 2019, Zussman published a brief history of geology at the University of Manchester with his colleague, geologist David Vaughan.

== The rock-forming minerals ==
In 1961, it was announced that Jack Zussman and two fellow mineralogists who were also at the University of Manchester, Bob Howie and Alex Deer were working on a book on rock-forming minerals. The first volume, on ortho- and ring-silicates, was published in 1962, and by 1963, the five-volume set was already known as 'Deer, Howie and Zussman'. Zussman and colleagues kept working on the reference set for the rest of their careers, and long into retirement. By 2013 the full set included eleven volumes on specific mineral groups, along with three editions of an abridged version An Introduction to the Rock-Forming Minerals.

== Personal life and death ==
In 1960, Zussman married Judy, a nurse at the Manchester Royal Infirmary. Zussman turned 100 on 31 July 2024, and died one month later on 30 August 2024. Judy Zussman died in April 2025.
