= Zussmanite =

Phyllosilicate mineral

General
- Category: Phyllosilicate minerals
- Formula: K(Fe^{2+},Mg,Mn)_{13}[AlSi_{17}O_{42}](OH)_{14}
- IMA symbol: Zus
- Strunz classification: 9.EG.35
- Crystal system: Trigonal
- Crystal class: Pyramidal (3); H-M symbol: (3)
- Space group: R3
- Unit cell: a = 11.66, c = 28.69 [Å]; Z = 3

Identification
- Color: Light to medium green
- Crystal habit: Tabular crystals
- Cleavage: Perfect {0001}
- Fracture: Micaceous
- Tenacity: Flexible
- Luster: Sub-vitreous, resinous, greasy
- Streak: White
- Diaphaneity: Translucent
- Specific gravity: 3.146
- Optical properties: Uniaxial (−)
- Refractive index: n_{ω} = 1.643 n_{ε} = 1.623
- Birefringence: δ = 0.020
- Pleochroism: Weak; O = pale green; E = colorless

Zussmanite is a hydrated iron-rich silicate mineral with the chemical formula K(Fe^{2+},Mg,Mn)_{13}[AlSi_{17}O_{42}](OH)_{14}. It occurs as pale green crystals with perfect cleavage.

== Discovery and occurrence ==
It was first described in 1964 by Stuart Olof Agrell in the Laytonville quarry, Mendocino County, California. Zussmanite is named in honor of Jack Zussman (born 1924), Head of the University of Manchester's Department of Geology and co-author of Rock-Forming Minerals. In the Laytonville quarry, zussmanite occurs in metamorphosed shales, siliceous ironstones and impure limestones of the Franciscan Formation. It is a location of high pressure and low temperatures where blueschist facies metamorphic rocks occur. This is also the locality in which Deerite and Howieite were first discovered. This type of locality also produces micas, which have a similar structure as zussmanite.

The locality in which zussmanite occurs is one of ultra high to high pressure and low temperatures. This Barrovian type of metamorphism is usually distinguished by the P/T range rather than the ranges in pressure and temperatures (Miyashiro 1973). The three principal Barrovian types are low P/T type, medium P/T type, and high P/T type. The high P/T type, referred to as glaucophanic metamorphism, is characterized by the presence of glaucophane and forms glaucophane schists (Miyashiro 1973). Glaucophane schists, commonly referred to as blueschist-facies, result from metamorphism of basaltic rocks and are usually located in folded geosynclinal terranes (Deer, Howie & Zussman 1993). Glaucophane schists are characterized by low temperature (100–250 °C) high pressure (4–9 kbar) metamorphism (Deer, Howie & Zussman 1993). Zussmanite is commonly found with stilpnomelane and quartz, usually forming abundant porphyroblasts up to 1 mm in size, in the newly discovered locality in Southern Central Chile (Massonne et al. 1998).

== Composition ==
The blueschist facies phyllosilicate mineral occurs as a result of subduction of oceanic crustal rocks and oceanic-continental margin sediments along convergent plate boundaries. The ideal formula for zussmanite is KFe_{13}Si_{17}AlO_{42}(OH)_{14} with possible substitutions of sodium (Na) for potassium (K), in extremely small amounts (Lopes-Vieira & Zussman 1969). The possible iron (Fe^{2+}) substitutes are mainly magnesium (Mg) with trace amounts that could include: manganese (Mn), aluminium (Al), iron^{3+} (Fe^{3+}) and titanium (Ti) (Lopes-Vieira & Zussman 1969). Zussmanite was discovered in combination with deerite and howieite, two new minerals discovered in the Franciscan formation, Mendocino County, California. Deerite and howieite have been found at other locations while zussmanite has only been found at this type locality, making it a rare occurring mineral. Experiments have revealed that zussmanite is stable up to 600 °C at pressures between 10 kb and 30 kb and that the end members of zussmanite are orthoferrosilite, biotite and quartz. The example of the reaction is KFe_{13}[AlSi_{17042}](OH)_{14} (zussmanite) yields 10FeSiO_{3} (orthoferrosilite) + 1/2 K_{2}Fe_{6}Si_{6}Al_{2}O_{20}(OH)_{4} (biotite) + 4SiO_{2} (quartz) + 6H_{2}0 (water) (Dempsey 1981). The manganese analogue of zussmanite, coombsite, has been found in manganese-rich siliceous rocks in the Otago Schist in New Zealand.

== Structure ==
The space group and cell of Zussmanite are R*3, ahex 11.66 and chex28.69 Angstroms (Agrell, Bown & McKie 1965). The structure of Zussmanite contains continuous sheets of rhombohedrally stacked layers of Fe-O octahedral parallel to (0001) (Lopes-Vieira & Zussman 1967) and to either side of these are attached (Si,Al)–O tetrahedral in a way to produce a rhombohedral unit cell (Lopes-Vieira & Zussman 1969). These layers are linked to one another by potassium (K) atoms and also by three-member rings of tetrahedra that share oxygens with the six-members; displayed in figure 2 (Lopes-Vieira & Zussman 1967). Zussmanite's structure has a close affinity to that of the trioctahedral micas which have a layer of Fe-O octahedral sandwiched between inward pointing tetrahedral. It differs from the micas because its Si-O ratio is 9:21 which results in a sharing coefficient 1.83, as compared with 2.5 and 1.75 for micas, and 1.2 and 2.0 for framework silicates (Lopes-Vieira & Zussman 1969). The Fe-(O,OH) mean distance in the first octahedron is 2.1 Angstroms, the second octahedron is 2.14 Angstroms, and in the third octahedron is 2.17 Angstroms. The mean distance in the Si-O bonds in zussmanite are 1.61 Angstroms for the first tetrahedron, 1.61 Angstroms for the second tetrahedron, and 1.65 Angstroms for the third tetrahedron; data given in table I (Lopes-Vieira & Zussman 1969). The six-member rings are not directly linked to one another which allows for adjustment by tilting outwards of all tetrahedral, as opposed to many micas where rotations and tilts are used to achieve the larger dimensions of the octahedral layer. The flattening of the octahedral layer perpendicular to the layer is pronounced in zussmanite due to shared and unshared edges. This flattening could be due to the tendency for shared oxygens to come closer and shields iron (Fe) atoms from other neighboring iron (Fe) atoms.

== Physical properties ==
Zussmanite occurs in pale green tabular crystals with perfect cleavage. It tends to be uniaxial, weakly pleochroic and a specific gravity of 3.146 (Agrell, Bown & McKie 1965). Other types of zussmanite found in Laytonville, which are of fine-grained samples are assumed to be late-stage metamorphic products.

The perfect cleavage is a result of the continuous sheets of (Fe,Mg)^{−}(O,OH) octahedra parallel to (0001). The optical properties result from virtually pure zussmanite that was separated from thin sections, approximately 200 micrometers thick, under a polarizing microscope by means of a microdrill. The indices of refraction compare well with those determined be Agrell, Bown & McKie 1965 for the chemically different zussmanite from the Laytonville quarry (Massonne et al. 1998).
