= History of mineralogy =

Early writings on mineralogy, especially on gemstones, comes from ancient Babylonia, the ancient Greco-Roman world, ancient and medieval China, and Sanskrit texts from ancient India. Books on the subject included the Naturalis Historia of Pliny the Elder which not only described many different minerals but also explained many of their properties. The German Renaissance specialist Georgius Agricola wrote works such as De re metallica (On Metals, 1556) and De Natura Fossilium (On the Nature of Rocks, 1546) which began the scientific approach to the subject. Systematic scientific studies of minerals and rocks developed in post-Renaissance Europe. The modern study of mineralogy was founded on the principles of crystallography and microscopic study of rock sections with the invention of the microscope in the 17th century.

== Europe and the Middle East ==
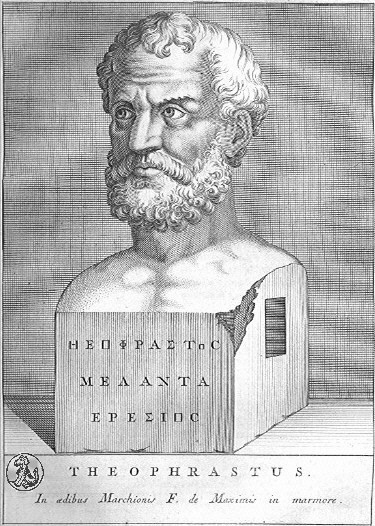
Theophrastus

The ancient Greek writers Aristotle (384–322 BC) and Theophrastus (370–285 BC) were the first in the Western tradition to write of minerals and their properties, as well as metaphysical explanations for them. The Greek philosopher Aristotle wrote his Meteorologica, and in it theorized that all the known substances were composed of water, air, earth, and fire, with the properties of dryness, dampness, heat, and cold. The Greek philosopher and botanist Theophrastus wrote his De Mineralibus, which accepted Aristotle's view, and divided minerals into two categories: those affected by heat and those affected by dampness.

The metaphysical emanation and exhalation (anathumiaseis) theory of Aristotle included early speculation on earth sciences including mineralogy. According to his theory, while metals were supposed to be congealed by means of moist exhalation, dry gaseous exhalation (pneumatodestera) was the efficient material cause of minerals found in the Earth's soil. He postulated these ideas by using the examples of moisture on the surface of the earth (a moist vapor 'potentially like water'), while the other was from the earth itself, pertaining to the attributes of hot, dry, smoky, and highly combustible ('potentially like fire'). Aristotle's metaphysical theory from times of antiquity had wide-ranging influence on similar theory found in later medieval Europe, as the historian Berthelot notes:

The theory of exhalations was the point of departure for later ideas on the generation of metals in the earth, which we meet with Proclus, and which reigned throughout the middle ages.

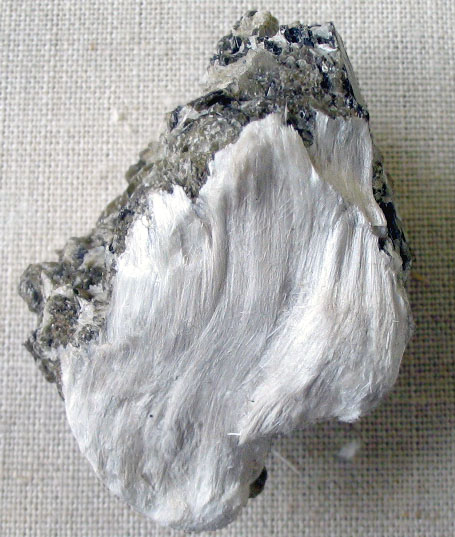
Fibrous asbestos on muscovite

Ancient Greek terminology of minerals has also stuck through the ages with widespread usage in modern times. For example, the Greek word asbestos (meaning 'inextinguishable', or 'unquenchable'), for the unusual mineral known today containing fibrous structure. The ancient historians Strabo (63 BC–19 AD) and Pliny the Elder (23–79 AD) both wrote of asbestos, its qualities, and its origins, with the Hellenistic belief that it was of a type of vegetable. Pliny the Elder listed it as a mineral common in India, while the historian Yu Huan (239–265 AD) of China listed this 'fireproof cloth' as a product of ancient Rome or Arabia (Chinese: Daqin). Although documentation of these minerals in ancient times does not fit the manner of modern scientific classification, there was nonetheless extensive written work on early mineralogy.

=== Pliny the Elder ===
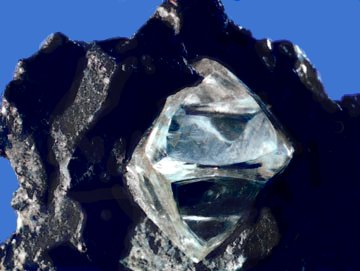
Octahedral shape of diamond

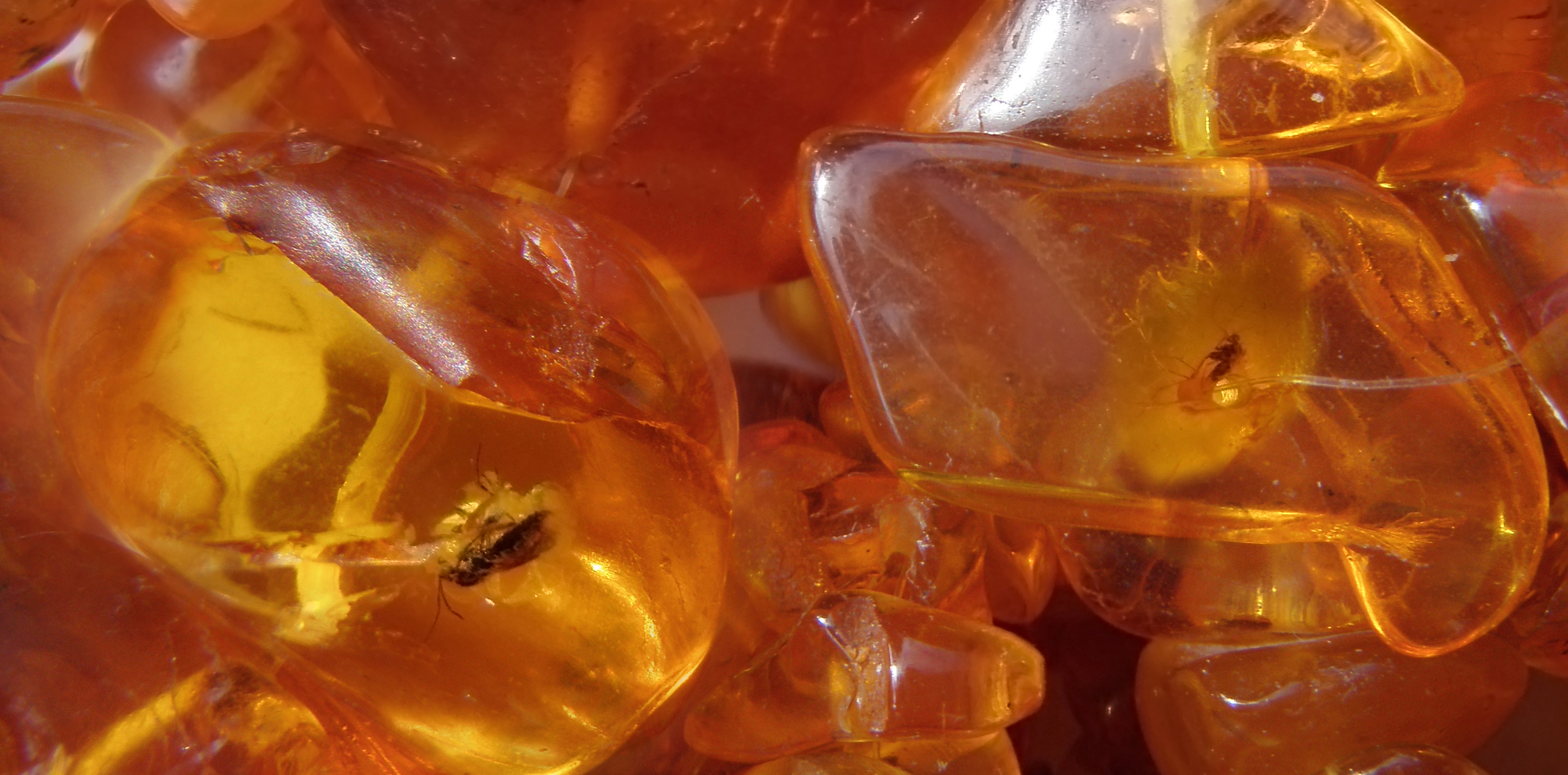
Baltic amber necklace with trapped insects

For example, Pliny devoted five entire volumes of his work Naturalis Historia (77 AD) to the classification of "earths, metals, stones, and gems". He not only describes many minerals not known to Theophrastus, but discusses their applications and properties. He is the first to correctly recognise the origin of amber for example, as the fossilised remnant of tree resin from the observation of insects trapped in some samples. He laid the basis of crystallography by discussing crystal habit, especially the octahedral shape of diamond. His discussion of mining methods is unrivalled in the ancient world, and includes, for example, an eye-witness account of gold mining in northern Spain, an account which is fully confirmed by modern research.

However, before the more definitive foundational works on mineralogy in the 16th century, the ancients recognized no more than roughly 350 minerals to list and describe.

=== Jabir and Avicenna ===
Illustrations of precious stones and other objects in a Persian manuscript produced in Shiraz in 1341, during the Ilkhanid period.

Islamic alchemists advanced the sulfur-mercury theory of metals, a theory that is first found in pseudo-Apollonius of Tyana's Sirr al-khalīqa (The Secret of Creation, c. 750–850) and in the Arabic writings attributed to Jābir ibn Ḥayyān (written c. 850–950). It would remain the basis of all theories of metallic composition until the eighteenth century.

With philosophers such as Proclus, the theory of Neoplatonism also spread to the Islamic world during the Middle Ages, providing a basis for metaphysical ideas on mineralogy in the medieval Middle East as well. The medieval Islamic scientists expanded upon this as well, including the Persian scientist Ibn Sina (ابوعلى سينا/پورسينا) (980–1037 AD), also known as Avicenna, who rejected alchemy and the earlier notion of Greek metaphysics that metallic and other elements could be transformed into one another. However, what was largely accurate of the ancient Greek and medieval metaphysical ideas on mineralogy was the slow chemical change in composition of the Earth's crust.

Mineralogy also had an established written tradition in medieval Iran and Central Asia. Al-Biruni, in his Arabic-language Kitab al-Jamahir fi Ma'rifat al-Jawahir, described minerals, metals and gemstones, and measured the specific gravity of several substances using an apparatus of his own design. Later Persian-language works included Muhammad ibn Abi al-Barakat Jawhari Nishapuri's Jawaher-nama (1196), which drew on earlier writings as well as the author's experience with gemstones and jewellery. This tradition continued in Nasir al-Din al-Tusi's Tansuq-nama-ye Ilkhani (c. 1258) and Abu'l-Qasim Kashani's Ara'es al-jawaher wa nafa'es al-ata'eb (1300), which covered minerals and precious stones alongside metals and related crafts.

=== Georgius Agricola, 'Father of Mineralogy' ===
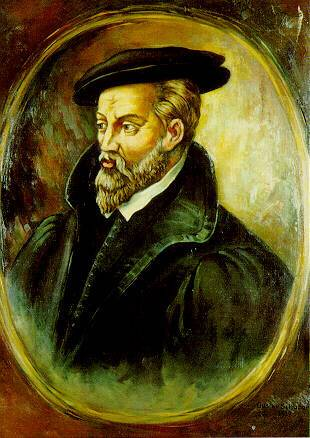
Agricola, author of De re metallica

In the early 16th century AD, the writings of the German scientist Georg Bauer, pen-name Georgius Agricola (1494–1555 AD), in his Bermannus, sive de re metallica dialogus (1530) is considered to be the official establishment of mineralogy in the modern sense of its study. He wrote the treatise while working as a town physician and making observations in Joachimsthal, which was then a center for mining and metallurgic smelting industries. In 1544, he published his written work De ortu et causis subterraneorum, which is considered to be the foundational work of modern physical geology. In it (much like Ibn Sina) he heavily criticized the theories laid out by the ancient Greeks such as Aristotle. His work on mineralogy and metallurgy continued with the publication of De veteribus et novis metallis in 1546, and culminated in his best known works, the De re metallica of 1556. It was an impressive work outlining applications of mining, refining, and smelting metals, alongside discussions on geology of ore bodies, surveying, mine construction, and ventilation. He praises Pliny the Elder for his pioneering work Naturalis Historia and makes extensive references to his discussion of minerals and mining methods. For the next two centuries this written work remained the authoritative text on mining in Europe.

Agricola had many various theories on mineralogy based on empirical observation, including understanding of the concept of ore channels that were formed by the circulation of ground waters ('succi') in fissures subsequent to the deposition of the surrounding rocks. As will be noted below, the medieval Chinese previously had conceptions of this as well.

For his works, Agricola is posthumously known as the "Father of Mineralogy".

After the foundational work written by Agricola, it is widely agreed by the scientific community that the Gemmarum et Lapidum Historia of Anselmus de Boodt (1550–1632) of Bruges is the first definitive work of modern mineralogy. The German mining chemist J.F. Henckel wrote his Flora Saturnisans of 1760, which was the first treatise in Europe to deal with geobotanical minerals, although the Chinese had mentioned this in earlier treatises of 1421 and 1664. In addition, the Chinese writer Du Wan made clear references to weathering and erosion processes in his Yun Lin Shi Pu of 1133, long before Agricola's work of 1546.

== China and the Far East ==
In ancient China, the oldest literary listing of minerals dates back to at least the 4th century BC, with the Ji Ni Zi book listing twenty four of them. Chinese ideas of metaphysical mineralogy span back to at least the ancient Han dynasty (202 BC–220 AD). From the 2nd century BC text of the Huai Nan Zi, the Chinese used ideological Taoist terms to describe meteorology, precipitation, different types of minerals, metallurgy, and alchemy. Although the understanding of these concepts in Han times was Taoist in nature, the theories proposed were similar to the Aristotelian theory of mineralogical exhalations (noted above). By 122 BC, the Chinese had thus formulated the theory for metamorphosis of minerals, although it is noted by historians such as Dubs that the tradition of alchemical-mineralogical Chinese doctrine stems back to the School of Naturalists headed by the philosopher Zou Yan (305 BC–240 BC). Within the broad categories of rocks and stones (shi) and metals and alloys (jin), by Han times the Chinese had hundreds (if not thousands) of listed types of stones and minerals, along with theories for how they were formed.

In the 5th century AD, Prince Qian Ping Wang of the Liu Song dynasty wrote in the encyclopedia Tai-ping Yu Lan (circa 444 AD, from the lost book Dian Shu, or Management of all Techniques):

The most precious things in the world are stored in the innermost regions of all. For example, there is orpiment. After a thousand years it changes into realgar. After another thousand years the realgar becomes transformed into yellow gold.

In ancient and medieval China, mineralogy became firmly tied to empirical observations in pharmaceutics and medicine. For example, the famous horologist and mechanical engineer Su Song (1020–1101 AD) of the Song dynasty (960–1279 AD) wrote of mineralogy and pharmacology in his Ben Cao Tu Jing of 1070. In it he created a systematic approach to listing various different minerals and their use in medicinal concoctions, such as all the variously known forms of mica that could be used to cure various ills through digestion. Su Song also wrote of the subconchoidal fracture of native cinnabar, signs of ore beds, and provided description on crystal form. Similar to the ore channels formed by circulation of ground water mentioned above with the German scientist Agricola, Su Song made similar statements concerning copper carbonate, as did the earlier Ri Hua Ben Cao of 970 AD with copper sulfate.

The Yuan dynasty scientist Zhang Si-xiao (died 1332 AD) provided a groundbreaking treatise on the conception of ore beds from the circulation of ground waters and rock fissures, two centuries before Georgius Agricola would come to similar conclusions. In his Suo-Nan Wen Ji, he applies this theory in describing the deposition of minerals by evaporation of (or precipitation from) ground waters in ore channels.

In addition to alchemical theory posed above, later Chinese writers such as the Ming dynasty physician Li Shizhen (1518–1593 AD) wrote of mineralogy in similar terms of Aristotle's metaphysical theory, as the latter wrote in his pharmaceutical treatise Běncǎo Gāngmù (本草綱目, Compendium of Materia Medica, 1596). Another figure from the Ming era, the famous geographer Xu Xiake (1587–1641) wrote of mineral beds and mica schists in his treatise. However, while European literature on mineralogy became wide and varied, the writers of the Ming and Qing dynasties wrote little of the subject (even compared to Chinese of the earlier Song era). The only other works from these two eras were the Shi Pin (Hierarchy of Stones) of Yu Jun in 1617, the Guai Shi Lu (Strange Rocks) of Song Luo in 1665, and the Guan Shi Lu (On Looking at Stones) in 1668.

=== Theories of Shen Kuo ===
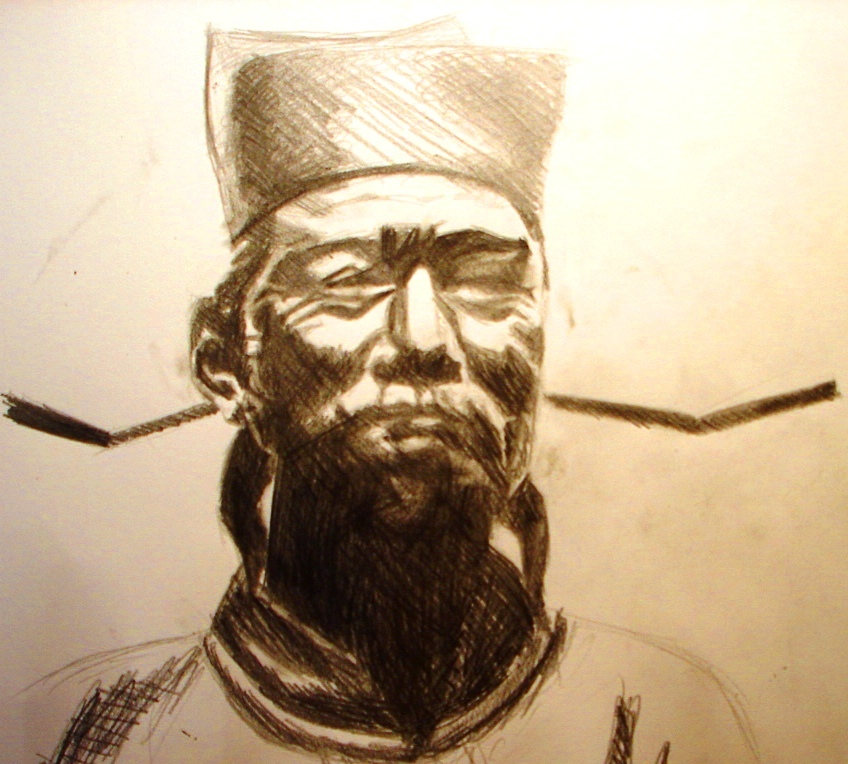
Shen Kuo (沈括) (1031–1095))

The medieval Chinese Song dynasty statesman and scientist Shen Kuo (1031–1095 AD) wrote of his land formation theory involving concepts of mineralogy. In his Meng Xi Bi Tan (梦溪笔谈; Dream Pool Essays, 1088), Shen formulated a hypothesis for the process of land formation (geomorphology); based on his observation of marine fossil shells in a geological stratum in the Taihang Mountains hundreds of miles from the Pacific Ocean. He inferred that the land was formed by erosion of the mountains and by deposition of silt, and described soil erosion, sedimentation and uplift. In an earlier work of his (circa 1080), he wrote of a curious fossil of a sea-orientated creature found far inland. It is also of interest to note that the contemporary author of the Xi Chi Cong Yu attributed the idea of particular places under the sea where serpents and crabs were petrified to one Wang Jinchen. With Shen Kuo's writing of the discovery of fossils, he formulated a hypothesis for the shifting of geographical climates throughout time. This was due to hundreds of petrified bamboos found underground in the dry climate of northern China, once an enormous landslide upon the bank of a river revealed them. Shen theorized that in pre-historic times, the climate of Yanzhou must have been very rainy and humid like southern China, where bamboos are suitable to grow.

In a similar way, the historian Joseph Needham likened Shen's account with the Scottish scientist Roderick Murchison (1792–1871), who was inspired to become a geologist after observing a providential landslide. In addition, Shen's description of sedimentary deposition predated that of James Hutton, who wrote his groundbreaking work in 1802 (considered the foundation of modern geology). The influential philosopher Zhu Xi (1130–1200) wrote of this curious natural phenomena of fossils as well, and was known to have read the works of Shen Kuo. In comparison, the first mentioning of fossils found in the West was made nearly two centuries later with Louis IX of France in 1253 AD, who discovered fossils of marine animals (as recorded in Joinville's records of 1309 AD).

== America ==
Perhaps the most influential mineralogy text in the 19th and 20th centuries was the Manual of Mineralogy by James Dwight Dana, Yale professor, first published in 1848. The fourth edition was entitled Manual of Mineralogy and Lithology (ed. 4, 1887). It became a standard college text, and has been continuously revised and updated by a succession of editors including W. E. Ford (13th–14th eds., 1912–1929), Cornelius S. Hurlbut (15th–21st eds., 1941–1999), and beginning with the 22nd by Cornelis Klein. The 23rd edition is now in print under the title Manual of Mineral Science (Manual of Mineralogy) (2007), revised by Cornelis Klein and Barbara Dutrow.

Equally influential was Dana's System of Mineralogy, first published in 1837, which has consistently been updated and revised. The 6th edition (1892) being edited by his son Edward Salisbury Dana. A 7th edition was published in 1944, and the 8th edition was published in 1997 under the title Dana's New Mineralogy: The System of Mineralogy of James Dwight Dana and Edward Salisbury Dana, edited by R. V. Gaines et al.

== See also ==
- Timeline of the discovery and classification of minerals
