= Agrellite =

Single chain inosilicate mineral

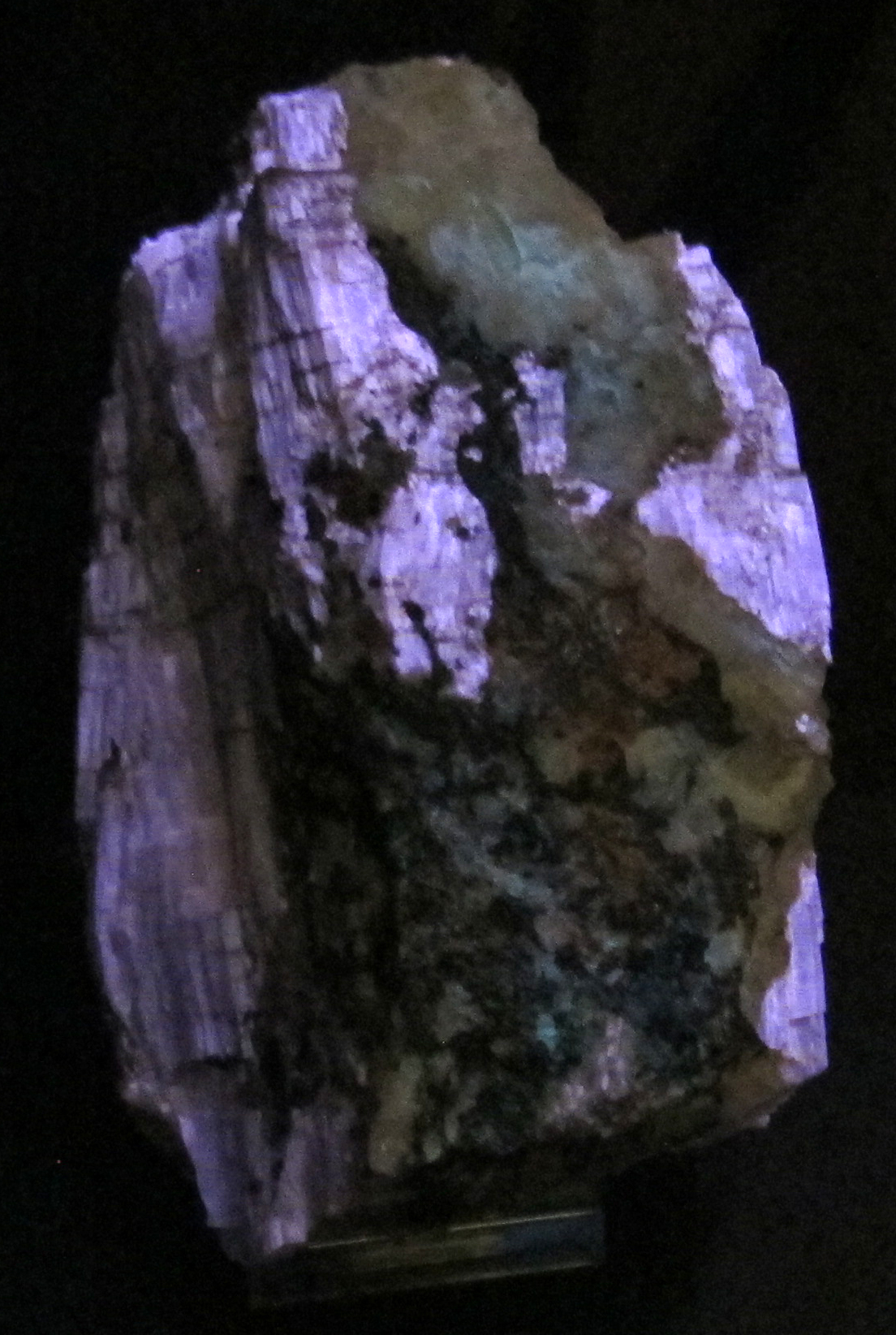
- Agrellite showing fluorescence in ultraviolet light

General
- Category: Inosilicates
- Formula: NaCa_{2}Si_{4}O_{10}F
- IMA symbol: Are
- Strunz classification: 9.DH.75
- Crystal system: Triclinic
- Crystal class: Pinacoidal (1̅) (same H-M symbol)
- Space group: P1̅

Identification
- Color: White, grayish-white, greenish-white
- Crystal habit: Lath - shaped like a small, thin plaster lath, rectangular in shape
- Cleavage: perfect [110]
- Mohs scale hardness: 5.5
- Luster: pearly
- Streak: white
- Diaphaneity: translucent
- Specific gravity: 2.88
- Optical properties: biaxial
- Refractive index: nα = 1.567 nβ = 1.579 nγ = 1.581
- Birefringence: δ = 0.014

Agrellite (NaCa_{2}Si_{4}O_{10}F) is a rare triclinic inosilicate mineral with four-periodic single chains of silica tetrahedra.

It is a white to grey translucent mineral, with a pearly luster and white streak. It has a Mohs hardness of 5.5 and a specific gravity of 2.8. Its type locality is the Kipawa Alkaline Complex, Quebec, Canada, where it occurs as tabular laths in pegmatite lenses. Other localities include Murmansk Oblast, Russia, Dara-i-Pioz Glacier, Tajikistan, and Saima Complex, Liaoning, China. Common associates at the type locality include zircon, eudialyte, vlasovite, miserite, mosandrite-(Ce), and calcite.

Agrellite displays pink fluorescence strongly under shortwave and weakly under longwave ultraviolet light. The fluorescent activator is dominantly Mn^{2+}, with minor Eu^{2+}, Sm^{3+}, and Dy^{3+}.

It is named in honor of Stuart Olof Agrell (1913–1996), a British mineralogist at Cambridge University.

== See also ==
- List of minerals
- List of minerals named after people
