= Stuart Olof Agrell =

English mineralogist (1913–1996)

- Born: March 15, 1913
- Died: January 29, 1996 (aged 82)
- Education: Trinity Hall, Cambridge
- Known for: Mineral and chemical studies of the Apollo 11 Lunar rock samples.
- Scientific career
- Thesis: 1. A petrological investigation of the adinoles at Dinas Head, Cornwall. and 2. A petrofabric study of the Ben Vuroch granite and the adjacent schists in Perthshire. (1942)
- Doctoral advisor: Frank Coles Phillips

Stuart Olof Agrell (5 March 1913 – 29 January 1996) was an optical mineralogist and a pioneer in applications of the electron microprobe to petrology. His involvement as a principal investigator in the analysis of Moon rocks collected in the Apollo program brought him to the attention of the British media and public.

== Biography ==
Agrell was born in Ruislip, Middlesex to a Scandinavian father and English mother. He went to Trinity Hall, Cambridge in 1932, the first year of C E Tilley's new Department of Mineralogy and Petrology, and attained a first class degree. This was followed by a PhD, which was a dual study of some metamorphic rocks from Dinas Head, Cornwall, and some Scottish metamorphic rocks from Perthshire, under Frank Coles Phillips in Cambridge. He submitted his thesis in May 1941. He went to join the staff at Manchester University in 1938, and in 1939 on the outbreak of World War II was put to work studying industrial slag mineralogy in order to improve the efficiency of the furnace process.

== Career ==
In 1949 he returned to Cambridge University as a Lecturer and as Museum Curator in Tilley's Department. He carried on with his work in laterites and widened his interest to calcareous rocks. With the collaboration of J. V. P. Long, Agrell began using the electron microprobe to study rocks and minerals. He took in hand an extensive but ill-organised collection of meteorites in the museum and from his study with the electron probe discovered the "Agrell effect", the decrease in the nickel content of kamacite as a boundary with taenite is approached.

In 1962 Agrell was appointed visiting professor on the American Geological Institute scheme. For two and a half years he was busy with Professorships at the University of Minnesota and at Berkeley and occasional field trips. One of these field trips took him to a road-side quarry on Highway 101 just south of Laytonville California. The local mineralogists superficially thought that the minerals were ordinary amphiboles. Agrell realized that the optics were wrong for that, and soon found that he had three new mineral species to name. Three of his colleagues at Cambridge and Manchester, Deer, Howie and Zussman had just published a famous five volume set called The Rock Forming Minerals so each of the authors got one of the minerals named after them. Playfully named, deerite was the mineral found with each of the other two, "but the junior author's minerals, howieite and zussmanite, never occurred together". (Reference: see published paper, below.) His work on meteorites and expertise in mineralogy led to him being accepted as a Principal Investigator for the investigation of lunar surface samples collected during Apollo 11, and as the only non-American petrologist of the preliminary examination team at Houston. When he returned to Britain with Moon rock in a carpet bag, he almost became a national celebrity for his appearances as the "expert geologist" in the BBC television coverage of astronauts collecting lunar rocks and soils. He was a pioneer in bringing geology to the general public. He published seminal papers on the constitution of the lunar soil and on lunar basalt mineralogy.

Agrell became a Fellow of Trinity Hall in 1964. Once interest in the Apollo programme declined, Agrell returned to meteoritics, his curatorial duties, and teaching final year students. As he came to the end of his career during the 1970s, he passionately wanted Cambridge to remain a centre of extraterrestrial sample research and attracted talented workers to form a flourishing planetary sciences group there.

Agrell retired in 1980, at the same time as the Mineralogy and Petrology Department merged into the new Department of Earth Sciences an outcome that he had quietly helped to achieve. Retirement made little difference to his level of activity and the award of a Leverhulme Emeritus Fellowship allowed him to return to the Marysvale district of Utah to continue work he had started in the 60s. In 1983 he was elected President of the Mineralogical Society of Great Britain. Three years later, in 1986, he suffered a stroke at the wheel of his car which involved him in a serious road accident. Although he managed to achieve some further research successes this effectively put an end to his work.

Agrell was an outstanding optical mineralogist and pioneer of precise chemical analysis for petrographic studies, Although he was an excellent communicator, he was a poor formal lecturer partly because of a slight stammer and he disliked writing because of a mild dyslexia. This affected the amount of recognition he received. His strength was in practical teaching and many of the students he taught and also advised unofficially went on to become leaders in their fields. His memory is perpetuated by the mineral agrellite (NaCa2Si4O10F). Agrell's papers are archived in the Sedgwick Museum.

== Family ==
Agrell married Jean Elspeth Imlay, a former fellow graduate student at Cambridge whose skills included fluency in Russian and computing. They had three sons.

== Publications ==
- Agrell, S. O.; and Long, J. V. P. "The Application of the scanning X-ray microanalyser to mineralogy", in X-ray Microscopy and Microanalysis (Engstrom, A.; Coslett, V. E.; and Pattee, H. H.; editors), (1960), Elsevier, Amsterdam (NL), pp. 391– 400
- Agrell, S. O.; Long, J. V. P.; and Ogilvie, R. E.; Nickel content of Kamacite near the interface with taenite in iron meteorites (1963), Nature 198, 749–750
- Agrell, S. O.; Polythermal metamorphism of limestones at Kilehoan, Ardnamurehan, Scotland (1965), Mineralogy Magazine 34, 1 15
- Agrell, S. O.; Bown, M. G.; and McKie, D.; Deerite, howieite and zussmanite, three new minerals from the Franciscan of the Laytonville district, Mendocino Co., California (1965) American Mineralogist 50, 278
- Agrell, S. O.; Peckett, A.; Boyd, F. R.; Haggerty, S. E.; Bunch, T. F.; Cameron, E. N.; Dence, M. R.; Douglas, J. A. V.; Plant, A. G.; Traill, R. J.; James O. B.; Keil, K.; and Prinz, M.; Titanian chromite, aluminium chromite and chromian ulvospinel from Apollo 11 rocks (1970), Proceedings of the Apollo ll Lunar Science Conference, Geochimica et Cosmochimica Acta, l (Suppl. 1), 81–6
