= Carl Hintze =

German mineralogist and crystallographer

Carl Adolf Ferdinand Hintze (17 August 1851, Breslau – 28 December 1916, Breslau) was a German mineralogist and crystallographer.

From 1868 he studied at the University of Breslau, where he was a student of Ferdinand von Roemer. He then furthered his education at the universities of Bonn and Berlin. Beginning in 1872 he served as an assistant to mineralogist Paul Heinrich von Groth at the University of Strasbourg. In 1875, eye problems along with financial issues forced him to abandon his scientific activity at the university, and he subsequently found employment as a trader in the minerals business. Since 1880 he worked as a scientific director for a private firm in Bonn.

In 1884, with assistance from August Kekulé, he obtained his habilitation at the University of Bonn. In 1892 he succeeded his former teacher, Ferdinand von Roemer, as professor and director of the mineralogical institute at the University of Breslau. In 1910 he also became a professor at the newly founded Technical University of Breslau.

He was the author of the acclaimed Handbuch der Mineralogie, a reference book that was considered to be indispensable to mineralogists. Unfinished at the time of his death, it was then continued by Gottlob Eduard Linck and other scholars. The mineral carlhintzeite is named in his honor.
