= William Alexander Deer =

British geologist (1910–2009)

William Alexander (Alex) Deer FRS (26 October 1910 – 8 February 2009) was a distinguished British geologist, petrologist and mineralogist.

== Biography ==
Alex Deer was born in Rusholme, Manchester, the son of William Deer. He attended Manchester Central High School and then Manchester University, and took up a research studentship at St John's College, Cambridge in 1934, to study for a PhD.

== Career ==
In 1937, after completing his PhD, Deer was appointed an assistant lecturer at the University of Manchester. On the outbreak of war in 1939, Deer joined the Chemical Warfare Section of the Royal Engineers, and later transferred to the Operations Staff. He served in the Middle East, Burma and North Africa, and was appointed to the rank of lieutenant-colonel.

Deer returned to Cambridge in 1946, where he was appointed University Demonstrator in mineralogy and petrology, and Fellow and Junior Bursar at St John's College, Cambridge. He was appointed a Tutor in 1949. In 1950, he was elected to the Chair of Geology at Manchester, where he spent the next several years. Deer returned to the University of Cambridge in 1961, after his election as Professor of Mineralogy and Petrology, succeeding CE Tilley. He was served as Master of Trinity Hall, Cambridge from 1966 to 1975, and Vice-Chancellor of Cambridge University from 1971 to 1973.

Deer was best known for his geological and petrological work in Greenland with Lawrence Wager; and later, for his extensive contributions as editor, along with Robert Andrew Howie and Jack Zussman, of the 11-volume reference work Rock-Forming Minerals and the abridged version, An Introduction to the Rock-Forming Minerals. The mineral deerite (IMA 1964–016) was named in his honour.

Deer was elected Honorary Fellow of both St John's College and Trinity Hall Cambridge.

== Expeditions ==
In 1935–1936, he accompanied Lawrence Wager as a petrologist on the 1935–1936 British East Greenland Expedition. They over-wintered on Greenland, with a party that included Wager's wife, Phyllis Wager (née Worthington), and Wager's brother (Dr Harold Geoffrey Wager; Hal) and sister-in-law (Elizabeth Mary Wager; Kit). Other members of the party included P. B. Chambers, Dr E. C. Fountaine, and fourteen Inuit, from two families. They built and stayed in a camp with a three-roomed central house, including a physiological laboratory and mess room, on the Skaergaard Peninsula, at the entrance to Kangerdlugssuak Fjord. In 1939, Wager and Deer published their report of the expedition. This treatise on the Skaergaard intrusion is regarded as one of the most significant contributions to the science of igneous petrology of the time.

In 1948 Deer led the NE Coast Baffin Land Expedition with Chris Brasher, also of St John's College, to see whether the igneous activity of the Kangerdlugssuaq region of East Greenland and the Disko Island area of West Greenland continued westward into Baffin Island. The reconnaissance was hampered by rough seas.

In 1953, Deer and Wager jointly led a British Greenland Geological Expedition back to Kangerdlugssuaq, where Wager had worked in 1930–31 and 1932, and Wager and Deer had overwintered in 1935–36. Five other geologists from Oxford and Manchester universities took part including C. J. Hughes (Oxford), G. D. Nicholls (Manchester), G. M. Brown (Oxford), D. S. Weedon (Oxford) and P. E. Brown (Manchester).

In 1966 Deer led another British Greenland Geological Expedition, with a party including G. A. Chinner (Cambridge), C. G. G. Born (Cambridge), R. Elsdon (Cambridge), P. D. Burnford (Cambridge), I. A. D. Sweetman (Cambridge), B. Atkins (Oxford), C. Kent-Brookes (Oxford), J. D. Bell (Oxford), D. G. Parrish (Oxford), J. D. Gunner (Oxford), P. E. Brown (Sheffield), C. D. Curtis (Sheffield), D. C. Dunn (Medical officer, Sheffield), D. Abbott (Research and Productivity Corporation, Sheffield) and N. McKinnon, P. A. Stirling, T. J. Sweeney, drillers. They carried out a programme of drilling and geological survey in Kangerdlugssuaq, extending the work of the 1953 British East Greenland Geological Expedition.

== Family ==
Deer married Margaret Marjorie Kidd, daughter of the electrical engineer William Kidd, in 1939 at St Paul's Methodist Church, Didsbury. Deer's papers are held at the Sedgwick Museum Archives, University of Cambridge.

== Publications ==
- Deer, William Alexander; Wager, Lawrence Rickard (1939). "Olivines from the Skaergaard Intrusion, Kangerdlugssuak, East Greenland" (PDF). American Mineralogist. 24: 18–25.
- Deer, William Alexander; Howie, Robert Andrew; Zussman, Jack (1962). Rock-forming Minerals. Wiley. Note: 5 volumes
- Deer, William Alexander; Howie, Robert Andrew; Zussman, Jack (1992). An Introduction to the Rock-Forming Minerals (2nd ed.). London: Longman. ISBN 0-582-30094-0.
- Deer, William Alexander; Howie, Robert Andrew; Zussman, Jack (2009). Rock-forming Minerals. Geological Society. Note: 11 volumes

Academic offices
Preceded by Ivor Jennings	Master of Trinity Hall, Cambridge; 1966–1975	Succeeded by Theodore Morris Sugden
Preceded by C.E. Tilley	Professor of Mineralogy and Petrology, University of Cambridge; 1961–1977	Succeeded by E.R. Oxburgh
Preceded by Owen Chadwick	Vice-Chancellor of the University of Cambridge; 1971–1973	Succeeded by John Wilfrid Linnett
