= De Natura Fossilium =

1546 book on mining by Georgius Agricola

Title page of De Natura Fossilium

De Natura Fossilium is a scientific text written by Georg Bauer also known as Georgius Agricola, first published in 1546. The book represents the first scientific attempt to categorize minerals, rocks and sediments since the publication of Pliny's Natural History. This text along with Agricola's other works including De Re Metallica compose the earliest comprehensive "scientific" approach to mineralogy, mining, and geological science.
