= An Introduction to the Rock-Forming Minerals =

Series of reference books on petrology

- Author: W A Deer, R A Howie, and J Zussman
- Subject: Mineralogy
- Publisher: Prentice Hall
- Publication date: 1966

An Introduction to the Rock-Forming Minerals (known familiarly as DHZ, from the surnames of its authors), is a reference book by William Alexander Deer, Robert Andrew Howie, and Jack Zussman often considered the "bible" of mineralogy. It covers hundreds of minerals, with details of their structure, chemistry, optical and physical properties, distinguishing features, and paragenesis. Entries range from one or two pages for obscure minerals, to dozens of pages for important ones like feldspars. The first edition was published in 1966, and a substantially expanded second edition in 1992. A third edition was published in 2013. It is intended as a reference book for undergraduate and postgraduate students.

Introduction to the Rock-forming Minerals is a condensed version of the multi-volume work Rock-forming Minerals by the same authors, which was published in 1962-3 with a second edition beginning in 1978, totalling 11 volumes. The condensed version omits some references, etymology, and chemical analysis present in the larger work.

== Editions ==
- W.A. Deer, R.A. Howie, and J. Zussman. (1962). An Introduction to the Rock-forming Minerals. London: Longmans. 528pp.
- W.A. Deer, R.A. Howie, and J. Zussman. (1992). 2nd ed. An Introduction to the Rock-forming Minerals. Essex: Longman Scientific and Technical; New York: Wiley. ISBN 0470218096. 696pp.
- W.A. Deer, R.A. Howie, and J. Zussman. (2013). 3rd ed. An Introduction to the Rock-forming Minerals. London: Mineralogical Society. ISBN 9780903056274. 498pp.
