= Robert A. Howie =

British petrologist and mineralogist

- Born: 4 June 1923 near Bedford
- Died: 10 March 2012 (aged 88); Bonsall, Derbyshire
- Education: Trinity College, Cambridge
- Scientific career
- Workplaces: Manchester University (after 1953), King's College London (after 1962), Lyell Professor of Geology, Royal Holloway, University of London (after 1986)

Robert Andrew Howie (4 June 1923 – 10 March 2012) was a notable English petrologist.

== Life ==
He joined the RAF University Six Months course in 1941. He was hoping to go to Cambridge (engineering), but he was assigned to Edinburgh (meteorology). He contracted polio while in Gibraltar, ending his RAF duty.

He went to Trinity College, Cambridge (Chemistry, Geology and Mineralogy) after the RAF, graduating in 1950. His doctorate was about charnockites (very dark granites) from India. He was Lecturer at Manchester University after 1953, and Reader and later Professor at King's College London after 1962. He was appointed Lyell Professor of Geology at Royal Holloway, University of London in 1986. W A Deer, R A Howie and J Zussman authored the series 'Rock-Forming Minerals', a widely known mineralogy textbook (1 ed. had 5 vol., 2 ed. has finally all 11 vol.). He was principal editor of Mineralogical Abstracts (1971–2003), he would write over 1600 abstracts per year (during c. 35 years).

The mineral howieite (IMA 1964-017) was named in his honour. Cambridge University awarded him a ScD degree (1974), 'The Geological Society' awarded him the Murchison Medal (1976) and the Mineralogical Society of America awarded him the Public Service Award (1999).

== Selected publications ==
- Deer, William Alexander; Howie, Robert Andrew; Zussman, Jack (1962–1963) Rock-Forming Minerals (1 ed.). London: Longman. Note: 5 volumes.
- Deer, William Alexander; Howie, Robert Andrew; Zussman, Jack (1966). An Introduction to the Rock-Forming Minerals (1 ed.). New York: Wiley.

=== Rock-Forming Minerals series, 2 ed. ===
- Deer, William Alexander; Howie, Robert Andrew; Zussman, Jack (1997). Rock-Forming Minerals. Orthosilicates. Volume 1A (2 ed.). London: Longman. p. 919. ISBN 0-582-46526-5.
- Deer, William Alexander; Howie, Robert Andrew; Zussman, Jack (1986). Rock-Forming Minerals. Disilicates and Ring Silicates. Volume 1B (2 ed.). Harlow: Longman Scientific & Technical. p. 629. ISBN 0-582-46521-4.
- Deer, William Alexander; Howie, Robert Andrew; Zussman, Jack (1978). Rock-Forming Minerals. Single-chain silicates. Volume 2A (2 ed.). London: Longman. p. 668. ISBN 0-582-46522-2.
- Deer, William Alexander; Howie, Robert Andrew; Zussman, Jack (1978). Rock-Forming Minerals. Double-chain silicates. Volume 2B (2 ed.). London: The Geological Society. p. 764. ISBN 1-897799-77-2.
- Deer, William Alexander; Howie, Robert Andrew; Zussman, Jack (1982). Rock-Forming Minerals. Sheet silicates: Micas. Volume 3A (2 ed.). London: The Geological Society. p. 758. ISBN 1-86239-142-4.
- Deer, William Alexander; Howie, Robert Andrew; Zussman, Jack (2009). Rock-Forming Minerals. Layered silicates excluding micas and clay minerals. Volume 3B (2 ed.). London: The Geological Society. p. 314. ISBN 978-1-86239-259-5.
- Wilson, M. J. (2013). Rock-Forming Minerals. Sheet silicates: clay minerals. Volume 3C (2 ed.). London: The Geological Society. p. 724. ISBN 978-1-86239-359-2.
- Deer, William Alexander; Howie, Robert Andrew; Zussman, Jack (1978). Rock-Forming Minerals. Framework Silicates: Feldspars. Volume 4A (2 ed.). London: The Geological Society.
- Deer, William Alexander; Howie, Robert Andrew; Zussman, Joseph; Chang, L L Y; Wise, W S (2004). Rock-Forming Minerals. Framework silicates: silica minerals, feldspathoids and zeolites. Volume 4B (2 ed.). London: The Geological Society. p. 982. ISBN 1-86239-144-0.
- J. F. W. Bowles; R. A. Howie; D. J. Vaughan; J. Zussman (2011). Rock-Forming Minerals. Non-silicates: oxides, hydroxides and sulphides. Volume 5A (2 ed.). London: The Geological Society. p. 920. ISBN 978-1-86239-315-8.
- Chang, L. L. Y.; Howie, Robert Andrew; Zussman, Jack (1996). Rock-Forming Minerals. Non-silicates: sulphates, carbonates, phosphates, halides. Volume 5B (2 ed.). Harlow, Essex: Longman. p. 383. ISBN 0-582-30093-2.
