= Department of Earth Sciences, University of Cambridge =

UK academic institution

Department of Earth Sciences
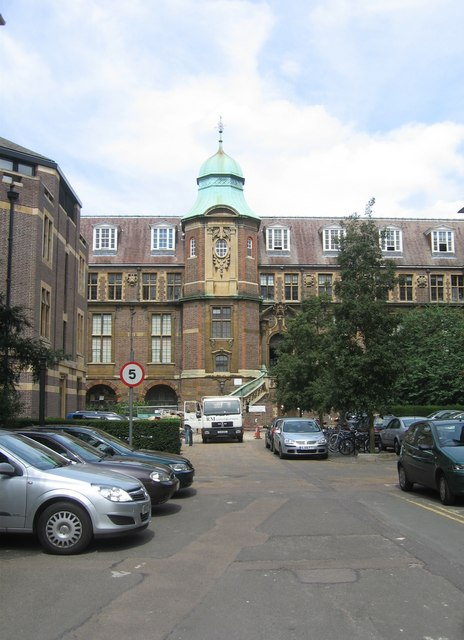
- Former names: Amalgamation of the Department of Geology, Department of Geodesy and Geophysics and the Department of Mineralogy and Petrology
- Established: c. 1731
- Head of Department: Marie Edmonds (2024-
- Location: Cambridge, United Kingdom; 52°12′11″N 0°7′20″E
- Website: www.esc.cam.ac.uk

The Department of Earth Sciences at Cambridge is the University of Cambridge's Earth Sciences department. First formed around 1731, the department incorporates the Sedgwick Museum of Earth Sciences.

== History ==
The department's history can be traced back to 1731 when the 1st Woodwardian Professor of Geology was appointed, in accordance with the bequest of John Woodward. The present Department of Earth Sciences was formed by an amalgamation of the Department of Geology, Department of Geodesy and Geophysics and the Department of Mineralogy and Petrology in 1980. When the three departments were amalgamated the Chair of Geophysics and Chair of Mineralogy and Petrology, along with the Woodwardian Professorship, were assigned to the newly formed Department of Earth Sciences.

The main location of the department is at the Downing Site, Downing St. The Bullard Laboratories, located in West Cambridge on Madingley Rd is a satellite department of the main building. The department incorporates the Sedgwick Museum of Earth Sciences and the Godwin Laboratory.

The department is the home of the Sedgwick Club, which was founded in memory of Adam Sedgwick in 1880, and is the oldest student run geological society in the world.

== Notable people ==
=== Fellows and Former Fellows ===
- Michael Bickle FRS
- Simon Conway Morris FRS
- Marie Edmonds FRS
- Harry Elderfield FRS
- Richard Harrison
- David Hodell FRS (Woodwardian Professor of Geology)
- Timothy Holland FRS
- Marian Holness FRS
- James Jackson FRS CBE
- Nick McCave (Former Woodwardian Professor of Geology)
- Dan McKenzie FRS CH
- Ekhard Salje FRS
- Bob White FRS
- Eric Wolff FRS

=== Alumni ===
- Stuart Agrell
- Sir David Attenborough CH
- John Auden
- George Band OBE
- Jon Blundy FRS
- Martin Bott FRS
- Chris Brasher CBE
- Derek Briggs FRS
- Peter Chadwick FRS
- Euan Clarkson
- Alan Cook FRS
- Claire Craig CBE
- Charles DarwinFRS
- Gertrude Elles
- William George Fearnsides FRS
- Richard Fortey FRS
- Sir Vivian Fuchs FRS
- Thomas Gaskell
- Alfred Harker FRS
- W. Brian Harland
- Dorothy Hill FRS
- Ted Irving FRS
- John E Marr FRS
- Rachel Mills CBE
- Sir Mark Moody-Stuart KCMG
- Yin Yin Nwe
- Mike O'Hara FRS
- Sanjaasürengiin Oyuun
- Bob Parker FRS
- Julian Pearce
- David Pugh
- Ros Rickaby FRS
- Fred Vine FRS
- Lawrence Wager FRS
- Gino Watkins
- Kathryn Whaler OBE
- Leonard Wills
- Sir James Wordie CBE, FRS

=== Former staff ===
- Edward Bullard FRS
- Oliver Bulman FRS
- Alex Deer FRS
- John Dewey FRS
- David Gubbins FRS
- Maurice Hill FRS
- W B R King FRS
- O T Jones FRS
- Drummond Matthews FRS
- W H Miller FRS
- Stephen Nockolds FRS
- Noel Odell
- Sir Keith O'Nions FRS
- Lord Oxburgh FRS
- Colin Pillinger FRS CBE
- Simon Redfern
- Barrie Rickards (Extensive studies on graptolites)
- Adam Sedgwick FRS
- Nick Shackleton FRS (Winner of the Wollaston Medal)
- R. S. J. Sparks FRS CBE
- C E Tilley FRS
- Harry Whittington FRS

Academic offices
Preceded by Richard J. Harrison	Head of Department of Earth Sciences, University of Cambridge; 2024–	Succeeded by incumbent
