= Harry Elderfield =

Harry Elderfield FRS
- Born: Henry Elderfield; 25 April 1943
- Died: 19 April 2016 (aged 72)
- Education: University of Liverpool (BSc, PhD); University of Cambridge (MA, ScD)
- Awards: Prestwich Medal (1993); Lyell Medal (2003); Urey Medal (2007); V. M. Goldschmidt Award (2013)
- Scientific career
- Fields: Geochemistry; Oceanography
- Workplaces: Imperial College London; University of Leeds; University of Cambridge
- Doctoral students: Rachel Ann Mills; Ros Rickaby

Henry Elderfield FRS (25 April 1943 – 19 April 2016), was Professor of Ocean Chemistry and Palaeochemistry at the Godwin Laboratory in the Department of Earth Sciences at the University of Cambridge. He made his name in ocean chemistry and palaeochemistry, using trace metals and isotopes in biogenic carbonate as palaeochemical tracers, and studying the chemistry of modern and ancient oceans - especially those of the glacial epoch and the Cenozoic.

== Early life and education ==
Elderfield was born in Lazenby, North Yorkshire; a twin brother to John Elderfield. His father had been reported 'missing in action', shortly before he was born. Elderfield received his education from Sir William Turner's Grammar School and Eston Grammar School. He attended the University of Liverpool obtaining a Bachelor of Science degree in chemistry (oceanography) in 1965. He worked as a research fellow in the Geology Department, Imperial College London between 1968 and 1969 whilst completing his PhD at the University of Liverpool in 1970.

== Career and research ==
He was appointed a lecturer in the Department of Earth Sciences, University of Leeds in 1969, a position he held until 1982. From 1982 until 1989 he held the post of assistant director in research in the Department of Earth Sciences at the University of Cambridge. He was awarded the degree of Doctor of Science in 1989 and the same year, was appointed reader in geochemistry at Cambridge. Elderfield was appointed Professor of Ocean Geochemistry and Palaeochemistry in 1999.

=== Early career ===
His early career was focused on the behaviour of trace metals in oceans and their sediments, and on fluid flow through the oceanic crust and sediments under the influence of off-axis hydrothermal circulation. He became one of the first low-temperature geochemists to appreciate how radiogenic isotopes might be used to solve the problems of marine geochemistry, developing the seawater strontium isotope curve for the Cenozoic.

He also worked on iodine speciation in seawater and porewaters, the separation of cerium from other rare earth elements in a classic example of redox behaviour; he has developed a precise mass spectrometric analysis method – and made the first-ever measurements of oceanic profiles for – 10 rare earth elements. The rare earths are now widely used as tracers in sedimentary geochemistry and palaeoceanography.

=== Later research ===
Elderfield's later research focused on ocean chemistry and paleochemistry, and his results have had a far-reaching impact on the academic geochemistry discipline. He contributed significantly to marine chemistry, most notably the fate of metals in hydrothermal processes, the formation of manganese nodules, and the biogeochemical cycles of elements including iodine and strontium.

His latter interests included defining chemical proxies from biogenic carbonates and using them to understand the ancient ocean. He pioneered the development of foraminiferal magnesium thermometry, which has become accepted for the estimation of past ocean temperatures.

=== Selected publications ===
- Elderfield, H., Holland, D. & Turekian, K.K. (2003) Treatise on geochemistry. Elsevier Science, 646p
- Carbonate Mysteries
- The rare-earth elements in rivers, estuaries, and coastal seas and their significance to the composition of ocean waters
- Application of the Cerium anomaly as a palaeoredox indicator: the ground rules
- Sr isotope composition of sea water over the past 75 Myr
- Interstitial water iodine enrichments in sediments from the eastern Pacific
- The rare-earth elements in sea-water
- Rare-earth element geochemistry of oceanic ferromanganese nodules and associated sediments

=== Awards and honours ===
- Fulbright Scholar, 1988
- Prestwich Medal, the Geological Society of London 1993
- Fellow of the European Association of Geochemistry, 2000
- Elected a Fellow of the Royal Society (FRS) in 2001
- Lyell Medal of the Geological Society of London, 2003
- Urey Medal, European Association of Geochemistry, 2007
- V. M. Goldschmidt Award, Geochemical Society, 2013
