= Peter Friend (geologist) =

British geologist (1934–2025)

Peter Furneaux Friend
- Born: 1934
- Died: October 9, 2025; Cambridge
- Education: University of Cambridge (B.A., PhD)
- Awards: Prestwich Medal (2010); Polar Medal (2015)
- Scientific career
- Fields: Sedimentary Geology
- Workplaces: University of Cambridge
- Thesis: Devonian rocks of Northern Spitsbergen (1963)
- Doctoral students: Mark Moody-Stuart

Peter Furneaux Friend (1934 – 2025) was a geologist who worked on the sedimentary deposits of ancient rivers, and conducted field expeditions in the Arctic, Europe and South-East Asia. He was a lecturer at the University of Cambridge from 1971 to 2001. He was awarded the Prestwich Medal of the Geological Society of London in 2010, and the Polar Medal in 2015.

== Life and career ==
Peter Friend was born in 1934, the son of Greville and Mary Friend. During the war he was evacuated to Peebles, and attended school at the Edinburgh Academy. He completed two years of military service with the Royal Engineers, and then took up a place a Gonville and Caius College, Cambridge to study geology in 1954. In 1957, he led an expedition to Spitsbergen, to carry out topographical and geological mapping. He completed a PhD on the Devonian sediments of Spitsbergen in 1963, and went on to work on sedimentary rocks around the world. In 1971, Friend took up a lecturership in Cambridge, and was elected a fellow of Darwin College in 1974. He retired in 2001, but continued to serve as chair of the board of trustees of the Cambridge Arctic Shelf Programme, and leading the programme of activities for the friends of the Sedgwick Museum in Cambridge.

== Research ==
Friend's expertise was in sedimentology. His particular contributions were to understand the links between the geometry of mud and sand beds in ancient sedimentary rocks, and the river systems which could have formed them. His work began on the ancient 'red beds' of Devonian age - which, in parts of Europe, form the Old Red Sandstone. His ability to infer the three-dimensional arrangements of these sand bodies, based on field observations, proved to be very valuable, both for geologists thinking about ancient environments of deposition; and for oil and gas companies, interested in finding porous rocks that might form the reservoirs for economic concentrations of hydrocarbons.

Later in his career, Friend began to work on younger sediments, for example the river and flood deposits that form thick fans of coarse debris along the fronts of active mountain belts, like the Pyrenees, and the Himalayas.

== Polar expeditions ==
Friend led and was involved in a number of expeditions to Spitsbergen and Greenland in the 1950s and 1960s, many of which were organised by Cambridge polar scientist, W. Brian Harland. Friend's first experience of fieldwork in Spitsbergen was in 1955, when he joined the Cambridge Spitsbergen Physiological Expedition, led by British physiologist Mary Lobban. During this trip, Friend conducted a geological and topographical survey of a part of southern Austfjorden, assisting the wider survey being led by Harland.

=== Cambridge University Expedition to Spitsbergen, 1957 ===
Friend led a team of four to extend a topographical and geological survey of north Dickson Land that had been started by an earlier Cambridge University expedition, in 1953. Friend along with MJ Allderidge, MJ Bowden and PT Warren landed at Billefjorden on 9 July, and sledged to Austfjorden, where they were to work. They completed seven weeks of fieldwork, and departed from Billefjorden on 28 August.

=== Cambridge Spitsbergen Expedition, 1958 ===
Friend led a return expedition to continue the work on the Devonian age rocks of areas of Dickson land and Andrée land. During this expedition, a second party carried out geological investigations in the Oslobreen area of Ny-Friesland. One of the party, CJB Kirton, a first year student from Queens' College, Cambridge died in an accidental fall of scree. Memorials to Kirton were left by the members of the 1959 expedition, and in 2008, a return trip was made by expedition and family members to mark the 50th anniversary of the tragedy.

=== Cambridge Spitsbergen Expedition, 1961 ===
This was another large expedition, involving coordinated teams of students and researchers who continued the geological studies of Svalbard. Friend led another party back to Dickson Land to extend their work on the Devonian sedimentary rocks of the area. The participants in the expedition included David G. Gee, who went on to complete a PhD on the structure of Spitsbergen; Dan P. McKenzie, who had just completed his first year of studies in Cambridge, and later played a key role in the emerging theories of Plate Tectonics; and Mark Moody-Stuart who later completed a PhD with Friend, and went on to have a career in the oil industry.

=== Cambridge Spitsbergen Expedition, 1962 ===
In 1962, Friend was deputy leader of a large expedition that was led by W. Brian Harland. Friend led a group working on the Devonian sedimentary rocks of east and west Dickson Land, and brought back multiple samples of fossil vertebrates.

Friend returned to Spitsbergen for a seventh time in 1965, when he completed his reconnaissance survey of the Devonian rocks of Dickson Land.

== Recognition ==
To mark Peter Friend's retirement, several of his colleagues convened a special session in his honour at a meeting of the International Association of Sedimentologists in Coimbra, Portugal, in 2004, and published a collection of 26 papers as a tribute in 2007.

His contributions to geology and to Arctic studies were recognised in 2010 with the award of the Prestwich Medal, for his work on fluvial sandstone bodies, and in 2015 with the award of the Polar Medal, by the Queen.
