= James Jackson (geophysicist) =

British geologist and geophysicist

- Born: 12 December 1954 (age 71); India
- Education: University of Cambridge
- Scientific career
- Fields: Geophysics
- Doctoral advisor: Dan McKenzie

James Anthony Jackson CBE FRS (born 12 December 1954) is Emeritus Professor of Active Tectonics and formerly head of Bullard Laboratories, and Head of the Department of Earth Sciences, Cambridge University. He made his name in geophysics, using earthquake source seismology to examine how continents are deformed. His central research focus is to observe the active processes shaping our continents.

== Education and career ==
Jackson was born and raised in India, which probably established his interest in all aspects of Asia, which is where much of his current research has been concentrated. He was sent back to boarding school in the UK for his education.

Jackson attended the University of Cambridge from 1973 graduating with a 1st Class degree in geology in 1976. Then, under the tutelage of Dan McKenzie at the Bullard Laboratories, Cambridge, he received his PhD in 1980. His research was within geophysics and used earthquakes to study the processes that produce the major surface features of the continents, such as mountain belts and basins. It included field work with seismometers in Iran and with the Seismic Discrimination Group at the Massachusetts Institute of Technology.

Between 1977 and 1981 he was a visiting scientist in the Seismic Discrimination Group at MIT before returning to Cambridge to take up a research fellow position in Queens' College, Cambridge, where he became Assistant Dean in 1983. In 1984, he was appointed as an assistant lecturer in the Department of Earth Sciences, Cambridge, lecturer in 1988 and reader in 1996. He was made Professor of Active Tectonics in the Department of Earth Sciences in 2003.

Communicating about the implications of his research for resilience against earthquakes, and about geophysics and earthquakes, to both societies at large and organisations has been an important part of his work. In 1995 he gave the televised Royal Institution Christmas Lectures. In 2023 he was a guest on the BBC Radio 4 programme The Life Scientific.

=== Current research ===
Using evidence from earthquakes, remote sensing, geodesy and geomorphology he is able to observe, quantitatively, the geometry and rates of deformation processes while they are active. In addition to seismology, his current research uses space-based remote sensing (including radar interferometry, GPS measurements and optical imagery) combined with observations of the landscape in the field, to study the evolution and deformation of the continents on all scales, from the movement of individual faults in earthquakes to the evolution of mountain belts.

Much of his work is carried out in collaboration with researchers from the COMET Project where he is associate director.

== Selected publications ==
- Jackson, J.A. 1982, "Seismicity, normal faulting, and the geomorphological development of the Gulf of Corinth ( Greece): the Corinth earthquakes of February and March 1981.", Earth and Planetary Science Letters, vol. 57, no. 2, pp. 377–397.
- McKenzie, D. & Jackson, J. 1983, "The relationship between strain rates, crustal thickening, palaeomagnetism, finite strain and fault movements within a deforming zone.", Earth & Planetary Science Letters, vol. 65, no. 1, pp. 182–202.
- Jackson, J. & McKenzie, D. 1984, "Active tectonics of the Alpine- Himalayan Belt between western Turkey and Pakistan.", Geophysical Journal – Royal Astronomical Society, vol. 77, no. 1, pp. 185–264.
- Jackson, J. & McKenzie, D. 1988, "The relationship between plate motions and seismic moment tensors, and the rates of active deformation in the Mediterranean and Middle East", Geophysical Journal – Royal Astronomical Society, vol. 93, no. 1, pp. 45–73.
- Ambraseys, N.N. & Jackson, J.A. 1990, "Seismicity and associated strain of central Greece between 1890 and 1988", Geophysical Journal International, vol. 101, no. 3, pp. 663–708.
- Taymaz, T., Jackson, J. & McKenzie, D. 1991, "Active tectonics of the north and central Aegean Sea", Geophysical Journal International, vol. 106, no. 2, pp. 433–490.
- Jackson, J. 1994, "Active tectonics of the Aegean region", Annual Review of Earth and Planetary Sciences, vol. 22, pp. 239–271.
- Jackson, J., Norris, R. & Youngson, J. 1996, "The structural evolution of active fault and fold systems in central Otago, New Zealand: Evidence revealed by drainage patterns", Journal of Structural Geology, vol. 18, no. 2–3, pp. 217–234.
- Ambraseys, N.N. & Jackson, J.A. 1998, "Faulting associated with historical and recent earthquakes in the Eastern Mediterranean region", Geophysical Journal International, vol. 133, no. 2, pp. 390–406.
- Maggi, A., Jackson, J.A., McKenzie, D. & Priestley, K. 2000, "Earthquake focal depths, effective elastic thickness, and the strength of the continental lithosphere", Geology, vol. 28, no. 6, pp. 495–498.
- Jackson, J. 2002, "Strength of the continental lithosphere: Time to abandon the jelly sandwich?", GSA Today, vol. 12, no. 9, pp. 4–10.

== Awards ==
- Entrance Exhibition, Queens' College, 1973
- Foundation Scholar, Queens' College, 1975
- Harkness Prize, University of Cambridge, 1976
- Shell International Petroleum Scholarship, 1976–1979
- President's Award, Geological Society of London, 1985
- Sedgwick Prize, University of Cambridge, 1986 & 1990
- Royal Institution Christmas Lecture on Planet Earth, An Explorer's guide, 1995
- Bigsby Medal, Geological Society of London, 1997
- Joly Lecture, Trinity College, 2000
- Bullerwell Lecture, British Geophysical Association, 2000
- Mallet-Milne Lecturer, Society of Earthquake & Civil Engineering Dynamics, 2001
- Fellow of the Royal Society (FRS), 2002
- Fellow of the American Geophysical Union, 2003
- The Science Council recognised him as "one of the UK's 100 leading practising scientists" of 2014.
- Commander of the Order of the British Empire (CBE), 2015
- Wollaston Medal, 2015

Academic offices
Preceded by Ekhard Salje	Head of Department of Earth Sciences, University of Cambridge; 2008 - 2016	Succeeded by Simon Redfern
