= Marie Edmonds =

British scientist

Marie Edmonds FRS MAE
- Edmonds in 2019
- Born: 14 September 1975 (age 51); Devon, England
- Citizenship: United Kingdom
- Education: Plymouth High School for Girls; University of Cambridge
- Awards: Bigsby Medal (2021)
- Scientific career
- Fields: Volcanology; Petrology; Geochemistry
- Workplaces: University of Cambridge; University of East Anglia
- Doctoral advisor: David Pyle; Clive Oppenheimer
- Website: www.esc.cam.ac.uk/directory/marie-edmonds

Marie Edmonds FRS MAE (born 14 September 1975) is a British volcanologist and academic, whose research focuses on the physics and chemistry of volcanic eruptions and magmatism and understanding volatile cycling in the solid Earth as mediated by plate tectonics. She is Professor of Volcanology and Earth Sciences at the Department of Earth Sciences, University of Cambridge. Her research investigates the social and economic impacts of natural hazards; and the sustainable use of Earth's mineral and energy resources. Edmonds serves as the vice president and Ron Oxburgh Fellow in Earth Sciences at Queens' College, Cambridge. In 2024 she became Head of the Department of Earth Sciences, and in 2026, Head of the School of Physical Sciences at the University of Cambridge.

== Early life and education ==
Edmonds was educated at Plymouth High School for Girls, Plymouth, Devon (1987-1994). She studied the Natural Science Tripos at the University of Cambridge, specialising in geological sciences, and was awarded first class Bachelor of Arts (BA) degree 1997. She then undertook a Doctor of Philosophy (PhD) in the Department of Earth Sciences, University of Cambridge, which she completed in 2002.

== Career and research ==
After receiving her PhD she served as a volcanologist for the British Geological Survey at its Montserrat Volcano Observatory. From 2004 to 2006 Edmonds was a Mendenhall Fellow with the United States Geological Survey at its Hawaiian Volcano Observatory. Since 2007, she has served as a Fellow of Queens' College, Cambridge and a Professor at the University of Cambridge, where she teaches igneous petrology, geochemistry, and volcanology.

In 2024, she became Head of the Department of Earth Sciences, University of Cambridge. She was previously Deputy Head of Department and Director of Research. In August 2026, it was announced that she would be the next head of the School of the Physical Sciences, succeeding Professor Nigel Peake; she took up the appointment on 1 October 2026.

Edmonds serves as President of the Volcanology, Geochemistry, Petrology Section of the American Geophysical Union. Edmonds served on the Deep Carbon Observatory's (DCO) executive committee. Edmonds was Secretary for Science 2014–2018 at the Geological Society of London and was the Volcanology, Petrology Secretary of the American Geophysical Union 2016–2018. Edmonds served as an editor of the AGU journal Geochemistry, Geophysics, Geosystems (G-Cubed) 2017-2025. In 2023, Edmonds became Executive Editor of Bulletin of Volcanology.

Edmonds most cited publications include

- A distinct metal fingerprint in arc volcanic emissions
- Remobilization of crustal carbon may dominate volcanic arc emissions
- New geochemical insights into volcanic degassing
- A miniaturised ultraviolet spectrometer for remote sensing of SO2 fluxes: a new tool for volcano surveillance

=== Honours and awards ===
Edmonds was elected a Fellow of the Royal Society (FRS) in 2025. She was awarded an Honorary Doctorate from the University of Plymouth in 2025. In 2022 she was elected Geochemistry Fellow of the Geochemical Society and European Association of Geochemistry; and in 2021 a Member of the Academia Europaea (MAE). She was an AGU College of Fellows Distinguished Lecturer in 2021–2022. In 2021 she received the Bigsby Medal of the Geological Society of London 'for eminent services in the field of geology'. In 2020 Edmonds was one of three recipients of the Joanne Simpson Medal of the American Geophysical Union, its premier mid-career award, which comes with conferred Fellowship of the American Geophysical Union. Edmonds received the Thermo Fisher Scientific VMSG annual Award in 2019. In 2019 she gave Daly Lecture of the American Geophysical Union. In 2017 she received the Wager Medal of the International Association of Volcanology and Chemistry of the Earth's Interior. In 2014, Edmonds received the William Smith Fund of the Geological Society of London.

Academic offices
Preceded by Richard J. Harrison	Head of the Department of Earth Sciences, University of Cambridge; 2024–2026	Succeeded by Jerome Neufeld
Preceded by Nigel Peake	Head of the School of the Physical Sciences, University of Cambridge; 2026-present	Incumbent
