= Brian Eyre =

British material scientist

Professor Brian Eyre CBE FRS FREng
- Born: 29 November 1933
- Died: 28 July 2014 (aged 80)
- Website: www.materials.ox.ac.uk/2014/07/Professor-Brian-Eyre-CBE-FRS-FREng/

Brian Leonard Eyre (29 November 1933 – 28 July 2014) was a British material scientist, Chief Executive of the United Kingdom Atomic Energy Authority (UKAEA) and Professor at the University of Liverpool. He was also a visiting scholar at the University of Oxford and University College London.

== Career and research ==
Eyre was appointed Professor of Materials Science at the University of Liverpool from 1979 to 1984. His research investigated nuclear technology, including electron microscopy studies of radiation damage in metals and alloys. He played an important role in the privatisation of UKAEA to create AEA Technology.

== Awards and honours ==
Eyre was elected a Fellow of the Royal Society (FRS) in 2001 and a Fellow of the Royal Academy of Engineering in 1992. He was elected foreign associate member of the National Academy of Engineering of the United States in 2009 for his understanding of neutron irradiation-induced damage in materials and for developing technologies and policies for nuclear power in the United Kingdom.

He was appointed Commander of the Order of the British Empire (CBE) in the 1993 New Year Honours.
