= Richard J. Blakely =

American geologist

Richard J. Blakely is an American geologist. He is a fellow of the Geological Society of America and the American Geophysical Union. He was awarded the 2021 William Gilbert Award.
