= William Gilbert Award =

The William Gilbert Award is presented annually by the Geomagnetism and Paleomagnetism section of the American Geophysical Union and is "in recognition of outstanding and unselfish work in magnetism of Earth materials and of the Earth and planets." The awardees are chosen based on demonstrated excellence in: (1) scientific rigor, originality, and impact; (2) leadership and service to the geomagnetism and paleomagnetism research community; and/or (3) development of new cross-disciplinary research areas and methods. Every other year, the award is designated for an early-career scientist. The award is named after William Gilbert who first proposed the concept of a geomagnetic field in De Magnete (published in 1600).

== William Gilbert Award Winners ==
Source: American Geophysical Union

Year	Name
2022	Courtney Jean Sprain
2021	Richard J. Blakely
2020	Roger R. Fu
2019	Suzanne M. McEnroe
2018	Lennart de Groot
2017	John Booker
2016	Ron Shaar
2015	Michael Jackson
2014	Nicholas Swanson-Hysell
2013	Catherine Constable
2012	Robert E. Kopp
2011	Joseph Kirschvink
2010	Sabine Stanley
2009	Dennis Kent
2008	France Lagroix
2007	Robert S. Coe
2006	Richard J. Harrison
2005	James E. T. Channell
2004	Andrew Jackson
2003	Subir K. Banerjee

== See also ==
- List of geophysicists
- List of geophysics awards
- List of prizes named after people
