= Eric Wolff =

British climatologist, glaciologist, and academic

Eric William Wolff, FRS (born 5 June 1957) is a British climatologist, glaciologist, and academic. Since 2013, he has been Royal Society Research Professor of Earth Sciences in the Department of Earth Sciences at the University of Cambridge.

== Honours ==
In 2009, he was awarded the Louis Agassiz Medal by the European Geosciences Union. The medal is awarded 'in recognition of [an individual's] outstanding scientific contribution to the study of the cryosphere on Earth or elsewhere in the solar system'. In 2010, he was elected a Fellow of the Royal Society (FRS), the UK's most senior learned society for science. In 2012, he was awarded the Lyell Medal by the Geological Society of London. In 2020, he was awarded the Richardson Medal by the International Glaciological Society along with Christina Hulbe.
