= Nick McCave =

British geologist (born 1941)

Professor Nick McCave
- Born: February 3, 1941 (age 85)
- Education: Hertford College, Oxford; Brown University
- Awards: Shepard Medal (1995), Huntsman Medal (1999), Lyell Medal (2009)
- Scientific career
- Fields: Climate Change and Sedimentology

Ian Nicholas McCave (born 3 February 1941) is a British geologist, who was the Woodwardian Professor of Geology at the University of Cambridge Department of Earth Sciences from 1985 to 2008 and a fellow of St John's College from 1986 to present. He is a marine sedimentologist.

== Education ==
He was educated at Elizabeth College, Guernsey, Hertford College, Oxford and Brown University (PhD).

== Research summary ==
McCave's research looks at perturbations in the deep oceans, using evidence from marine sediments, micro-fossils combined with carbon dating, to obtain information on pre-historical climate change.

McCave uses monitoring points in the North Atlantic Ocean, Pacific Ocean and Indian Ocean to study how the Earth's meridional heat flux is distributed by warm surface-ocean currents and cold deep-ocean currents.

== Selected biography ==
- 1969 - 1985: Lecturer (until 1976), Reader (until 1985) at the University of East Anglia School of Environmental Sciences
- 1978 - 1999: Adjunct Scientist (until 1987), Guest Investigator (1999) at Woods Hole Oceanographic Institution
- 1988 - 1998: Head of the Department of Earth Sciences, University of Cambridge
- 1985 - 2008: Woodwardian Professor of Geology, University of Cambridge

== Other professional activities ==
- 1992 -1996: President of the Scientific Committee on Oceanic Research (SCOR) of the International Council for Science (ICSU).
- 2003 - 05: Member of the Steering Committee for NERC's Rapid Climate Change programme
- 2001 and 2008: Member of the UK Research Assessment Exercise panels for Earth and Environmental Sciences

Academic offices
Preceded by Ron Oxburgh	Head of Department of Earth Sciences, University of Cambridge; 1988 - 1998	Succeeded by Ekhard Salje
Preceded by Harry B. Whittington	Woodwardian Professor of Geology, University of Cambridge; 1985 - 2008	Succeeded by David A. Hodell
