= Dan McKenzie (geophysicist) =

British geophysicist (born 1942)

- Born: 21 February 1942 (age 84); Cheltenham
- Education: King's College, Cambridge, (BA 1963, PhD 1966)
- Awards: A.G. Huntsman Award (1980); Balzan Prize (1981); Wollaston Medal (1983); Japan Prize (1990); Royal Medal (1991); Copley Medal (2011); William Bowie Medal (2001); Crafoord Prize (2002)
- Scientific career
- Fields: Geophysics
- Workplaces: University of Cambridge
- Thesis: The shape of the earth (1967)
- Doctoral advisor: Teddy Bullard

Dan Peter McKenzie CH FRS (born 21 February 1942) is a professor of geophysics at the University of Cambridge, and one-time head of the Bullard Laboratories of the Cambridge Department of Earth Sciences. He wrote the first paper defining the mathematical principles of plate tectonics on a sphere, and his early work on mantle convection created the modern discussion of planetary interiors.

== Early life ==
Born in Cheltenham, the son of an ear, nose, and throat surgeon, he first attended Westminster Under School and later Westminster School, London.

== Education and career ==
McKenzie attended King's College, Cambridge where he read physics, obtaining a 2:1 in his final degree.

As an undergraduate student, McKenzie participated in a geological expedition to Spitsbergen, Svalbard, organised in 1961 by W. Brian Harland. McKenzie was a field assistant to polar geologist David G. Gee, and accompanied on the expedition by fellow student Mark Moody-Stuart, and research student Peter Friend.

As a graduate student, he worked with Edward "Teddy" Bullard who suggested he work on the subject of thermodynamic variables. He was awarded a Research Fellowship at King's College at the beginning of his second year which enabled him to study anything he wanted. As such, he gave up doing what Teddy had suggested and became interested in how the interior of the earth convects, something completely speculative at that time. McKenzie taught himself fluid mechanics and then went to the Scripps Institution of Oceanography at the University of California, San Diego, on the invitation of Freeman Gilbert and Walter Munk. After eight months he returned to Cambridge, submitting his PhD in 1966. He has since said that nothing in his early life as a scientist had such a profound effect on him as those eight months in California.

=== Plate tectonics ===
Spending time between Cambridge and a Fellowship held in Caltech, McKenzie was invited, along with Teddy Bullard, to a conference in New York which initiated his revolutionary work on plate tectonics. After listening to separate talks from Fred Vine on plate tectonics, he began looking at the thermal structure of oceanic plates as they formed and cooled.

Following this, he published a seminal paper with Bob Parker, which employed Euler's Fixed Point Theorem, in conjunction with magnetic anomalies and earthquakes to determine a precise mathematical theory on plate tectonics. This work was published some 3–4 months after the same work had been carried out by Jason Morgan at Princeton. Allegations were subsequently made suggesting that McKenzie was at Morgan's spring AGU talk where he presented his plate tectonics work. Later in 1968 he went to Princeton where he found that he and Morgan had solved two or three problems using identical mathematics in exactly the same way – plate tectonics was one, another was the thermal structure of the oceans and another was looking at earthquake mechanisms in a different way to seismologists.

Working with John Sclater, McKenzie determined the entire geological history of the Indian Ocean, the publication of which eventually resulted in them both receiving Fellowships at the Royal Society.

=== Mantle convection and sedimentary basins ===
McKenzie was awarded a university position and took it up in 1969. At this point he decided to move away from plate tectonics, choosing instead to focus on the behavior of fluids below the plates. He studied cellular convection and motions in the mantle whilst at the same time pursuing yet another new avenue of research; the development of sedimentary basins. It was from this work that he produced a classic paper that has been widely accepted by oil companies as the "McKenzie Model of Sedimentary Basins."

McKenzie was elected a Fellow of the Royal Society in 1976 aged just 34, and by 1978 was awarded a University Readership position.

== Later career ==
McKenzie continues to work at the Bullard Laboratories in Cambridge where he is Professor of Earth Science. Most recently his research has provided new insights into the tectonic evolution of Mars and Venus. In 2002 he was awarded the prestigious Crafoord Prize from the Royal Swedish Academy of Sciences for his contributions to research in the field of plate tectonics, sedimentary basin formation and mantle melting. With his appointment as a Member of the Order of the Companions of Honour in 2003, he brought the then current Cambridge membership of this elite group to four: Brenner, McKenzie, Hobsbawm and Hawking. He also served on the Physical Sciences jury for the Infosys Prize from 2009 to 2011.

== Selected bibliography ==
- McKenzie, D., Nimmo, F., Jackson, J., Gans, P. B. & Miller, E. L. 2000 Characteristics and consequences of flow in the crust. J. geophys. Res. 105, 11029–11046.
- McKenzie, D. & Fairhead, D. 1997 Estimates of the effective elastic thickness of the continental lithosphere from Bouguer and free air gravity anomalies. J. geophys. Res. 102 27523–27552.
- White, R.; McKenzie, D. (1989). "Magmatism at rift zones: The generation of volcanic continental margins and flood basalts". Journal of Geophysical Research. 94: 7685–7729. Bibcode:1989JGR....94.7685W. doi:10.1029/JB094iB06p07685. S2CID 140181589.
- Jackson, J. A. & McKenzie, D., 1988 The relationship between plate motions and seismic moment tensors, and the rates of active deformation in the Mediterranean and Middle East. Geophys. J. R. astr. Soc. 93, 45–73.
- Bickle, M. J. & McKenzie, D., 1987 The transport of heat and matter by fluids during metamorphism. Contrib. Mineral. Petrol. 95, 384–92.
- McKenzie, D. & O'Nions, R. K., 1983 Mantle reservoirs and ocean island basalts. Nature 301 229–231.
- England, P. & McKenzie, D., 1982 A thin viscous sheet model for continental deformation. Geophys. J. R. astr. Soc. 70, 295–321.
- McKenzie, D. (1978). "Some remarks on the development of sedimentary basins". Earth and Planetary Science Letters. 40 (1): 25–32. Bibcode:1978E&PSL..40...25M. doi:10.1016/0012-821X(78)90071-7.
- Parsons, B. & McKenzie, D., 1978 Mantle convection and the thermal structure of plates. J. geophys. Res. 83, 4485–96.
- McKenzie, D., Roberts, J. & Weiss, N. O., 1974 Convection in the Earth's mantle: towards a numerical simulation. J. Fluid Mech., 62, 465–538.
- McKenzie, D., Molnar, P. & Davies, D., 1970 Plate tectonics of the Red Sea and East Africa. Nature 226, 243–8.
- McKenzie, D.; Sclater, J. G. (1971). "The Evolution of the Indian Ocean since the Late Cretaceous". Geophysical Journal International. 24 (5): 437. Bibcode:1971GeoJ...24..437M. doi:10.1111/j.1365-246X.1971.tb02190.x.
- McKenzie, D.; Parker, R. L. (1967). "The North Pacific: An Example of Tectonics on a Sphere". Nature. 216 (5122): 1276. Bibcode:1967Natur.216.1276M. doi:10.1038/2161276a0. S2CID 4193218.
- McKenzie, D. (1966). "The viscosity of the lower mantle". Journal of Geophysical Research. 71 (16): 3995–4010. Bibcode:1966JGR....71.3995M. doi:10.1029/JZ071i016p03995.

== Awards ==
- Fellow of the Royal Society (FRS), 1976
- A.G. Huntsman Award for Excellence in the Marine Sciences, Royal Society of Canada, 1980
- Wollaston Medal, Geological Society of London, 1983
- Rutherford Memorial Lecture, 1988
- Japan Prize, with Dr W. Jason Morgan and Dr Xavier Le Pichon, 1990
- Awarded a Royal Society Research Professorship, 1996
- Awarded an Honorary DSc from the University of Bristol, 2000
- William Bowie Medal, 2001
- Crafoord Prize, Royal Swedish Academy of Sciences, 2002
- Appointed a Member of the Order of the Companions of Honour by Queen Elizabeth II, 2003
- Copley Medal, 2011
