= Prestwich Medal =

The Prestwich Medal is a medal of the Geological Society of London established in the will of Joseph Prestwich "to apply the accumulated annual proceeds...at the end of every three years, in providing a Gold Medal to the value of Twenty Pounds which, with the remainder of the proceeds is to be awarded... to the person or persons either male or female, and either resident in England or abroad, who shall have done well for the advancement of the Science of Geology; or, from time to time to accumulate the annual proceeds for a period not exceeding six years, and apply the said accumulated annual proceeds to some object of special research bearing on Stratigraphical or Physical Geology, to be carried out by one single individual or by a Committee; or, failing these objects, to accumulate the annual proceeds for either three or six years and devote such proceeds to such special purposes as may be decided". The money has also been used for funding publication and a library extension.

== Prestwich medalists ==
Source: Geological Society

- 1903 John Lubbock, 1st Baron Avebury
- 1906 William Whitaker
- 1909 Lady Maria Millington Evans
- 1912 (Library extension)
- 1915 Emile Cartailhac
- 1918 William Boyd Dawkins
- 1921 (Publications)
- 1924 (Publications)
- 1927 (Publications)
- 1930 (Publications)
- 1933 (Publications)
- 1936 (Publications)
- 1939 Samuel Hazzledine Warren
- 1942 Alfred Santer Kennard
- 1945 (Publications)
- 1948 Henri Breuil
- 1951 Harry Godwin
- 1954 Frederick William Shotton
- 1957 John Kaye Charlesworth
- 1960 Vivian Fuchs
- 1963 Kenneth Page Oakley
- 1966 Dennis Curry
- 1969 Louis Seymour Bazett Leakey and Mary Douglas Leakey
- 1972 Richard Foster Flint
- 1976 Walter William Bishop
- 1979 Ian Graham Gass
- 1981 Harold Garnar Reading
- 1984 Charles Downie
- 1987 Claud William Wright
- 1990 William James Kennedy
- 1993 Henry Elderfield
- 1996 Mary Fowler
- 1999 Claude Jaupart
- 2002 Adrian William Amsler Rushton
- 2005 Russell Coope
- 2007 Frederick Vine
- 2010 Peter Furneaux Friend
- 2014 Max Coleman
- 2015 Alastair Robertson
- 2016 Henry Emeleus
- 2017 not awarded
- 2018 Jan Zalasiewicz
- 2019 Anthony Barber
- 2020 Kristján Sæmundsson
- 2021 Sanjeev Gupta
- 2023 Teal Riley

== See also ==
- List of geology awards
- Prizes named after people
