= Ros Rickaby =

Professor of Biogeochemistry

Ros Rickaby OBE FRS
- Rickaby in 2025
- Born: Rosalind Emily Majors Rickaby; 29 June 1974 (age 52)
- Education: Berkhamsted School for Girls; Haileybury College
- Alma mater: University of Cambridge (MA, PhD)
- Scientific career
- Fields: Marine Biogeochemistry
- Workplaces: University of Oxford
- Thesis: Planktonic foraminiferal Cd/Ca : a new perspective on Southern Ocean palaeoproductivity (1999)
- Doctoral advisor: Harry Elderfield
- Website: www.earth.ox.ac.uk/people/rosalind-rickaby/

Rosalind Emily Majors Rickaby is a professor of biogeochemistry at the Department of Earth Sciences, University of Oxford and a Professorial Fellow at University College, Oxford. She is an Emeritus Fellow of Wolfson College, Oxford.

== Education ==
Rickaby was educated at Berkhamsted School for Girls and Haileybury College. She received her Master of Arts degree in Natural Sciences from the University of Cambridge where she was an undergraduate student at Magdalene College in 1995 and her PhD from the University’s Department of Earth Sciences in 1999, under the supervision of Harry Elderfield.

== Career and research ==
After her PhD, Rickaby went on to complete two years of post-doctoral research at the Department of Earth and Planetary Sciences at Harvard University, working with Daniel P. Schrag. Rickaby began as a faculty member of the Department of Earth Sciences at the University of Oxford following her postdoc at Harvard. Her research centers around paleoceanography and biogeochemical cycling in the oceans through deep time, with a focus on using fossil shells of marine micro-organisms as proxies to reconstruct past climate change. Her research group uses a variety of geochemical methods, including the analysis of trace element and isotopic ratios, to understand the biochemical behavior of paleoproxies, such as coccolithophores. She is also an author of the book Evolution's Destiny: Co-evolving Chemistry of the Environment and Life along with Bob Williams.

=== Awards and honours ===
- 2008: Awarded the European Geosciences Union Philip Leverhulme Prize for Outstanding Young Scientist
- 2009: Awarded the University of Miami's 36th Rosenstiel Award
- 2010: Awarded the James B. Macelwane Medal for significant contributions to the geophysical sciences by an outstanding young scientist
- 2012: Awarded the Gast lectureship for outstanding contributions to geochemistry
- 2016: Awarded the Wolfson Research Merit Award by the Royal Society from 2016–2021
- 2017: Awarded the Geological Society of London's Lyell Medal for contributions to soft rock studies
- 2022: Elected a Fellow of the Royal Society (FRS)
- 2023: Awarded the Science Innovation Award - Nicholas Shackleton Medal of the European Association of Geochemistry
- 2025: Awarded an OBE in the 2025 New Year Honours for services to biogeochemistry.
