= David G. Gee =

British geologist (1937-2023)

David G. Gee (11 December 1937 – 5 October 2023) was a British and Swedish geologist, who worked in Sweden for most of his career. He is known for his leadership of geological expeditions in the high Arctic and for his initiation and leadership of EUROPROBE.

== Biography ==
David G. Gee was born in Sutton, Surrey on 11 December 1937. His father was Edward Rowland Gee (1901–1988), a geologist who worked in India and Pakistan and was appointed OBE in 1960.

After spending much of his boyhood in India and later attending schools in England, Gee matriculated in 1958 at the University of Cambridge. There he graduated with a B.A., an M.A., and in 1966 a Ph.D. with a thesis on the tectonics of the Norwegian archipelago Svalbard. His Ph.D. thesis The structural geology of the Biskayer-huken Peninsula, North Spitsbergen was supervised by W. Brian Harland. In 1959 with the geologist Peter F. Friend, Gee made his first trip to Svalbard. He also participated in the Cambridge expeditions, led by Harland, to Svalbard in 1961, 1962, and 1963. In the 1961 expedition, his field assistant was an undergraduate student called Dan McKenzie, who later became a prominent geophysicist with his work on plate tectonics. In 1964 and 1965 Gee worked part-time for the Norwegian Polar Institute (Norsk Polarinstitutt) — during this employment he mapped parts of Svalbard. His wife is Norwegian. David and Veslemøy Gee were married in December 1965.

From 1966 to 1986 Gee was employed by the Geological Survey of Sweden (Sveriges geologiska undersökning, SGU) and worked on economic geology. He played an important role in the discovery of valuable minerals in the Myrviken Alum Shale Formation. From 1986 to 1994 he held a Swedish Research Council position as a professor at Lund University. At Uppsala University, he was Professor of Orogenic Dynamics from 1994 until 2004, when he retired as professor emeritus. At Uppsala University he was Dean of Earth Sciences from 1996 to 2002. He spent more than 20 field seasons in the high Arctic and was the leader of expeditions to Svalbard, Novaya Zemlya, the Polar Urals, the Taymyr Peninsula, and Severnaya Zemlya.

Gee was the author or co-author of more than 130 scientific articles in peer-reviewed journals. He is co-editor of four books on the following topics: Scandinavian Caledonides (1985), the Uralian Orogenic belt (1997), the Timanide Orogen (2004), and the dynamics of the European lithosphere (2006). He was a leading expert on the orogeny of the Scandinavian Caledonides. He and his colleagues have also done research on other Palaeozoic mountain belts of Eurasia. Gee had wide interests in the Earth sciences.

From 1988 to 2001, Gee chaired EUROPROBE, a multidisciplinary, multinational research program. EUROPROBE began operation in 1988 with funding by the International Lithosphere Program and was then jointly funded with sponsorship from the European Science Foundation from 1992 onward. Hundreds of geologists, geophysicists, and geochemists were brought together to study Europe's tectonic structures (especially in the Arctic). After the Fall of the Iron Curtain in 1989, EUROPROBE provided enhanced opportunities to geologists and other Earth scientists in eastern Europe until its termination of funding of active research in 2002. In 2006 two large volumes, with partial summaries of research funded by EUROPROBE, were published with Gee and Randell A. Stephenson as editors and with N. I. Pavlenkova as editor. From 1999 to 2001 Gee was the president of the European Union of Geosciences. He has served on several committees and from 2007 to 2009 was a senior advisor to the U.N. International Year of Planet Earth.

In 2007 Gee was awarded the Stephan Mueller Medal. In 2008, the Swedish organization Geosektionen, the geosciences branch of Naturvetarna (the Swedish Association of Professional Scientists), honoured him with the title “Sweden's Geologist of the Year”. Geosektionen, one of the national association members of the European Federation of Geologists (EFG), has bestowed the annual honorary title each year beginning in 1997.

Gee died in Uppsala, Sweden on 5 October 2023, at the age of 85.

== Selected publications ==
=== Articles ===
- Dallmeyer, R. D.; Gee, D. G. (1986). "40Ar/39Ar mineral dates from retrogressed eclogites within the Baltoscandian miogeocline: Implications for a polyphase Caledonian orogenic evolution". Geological Society of America Bulletin. 97 (1): 26. Bibcode:1986GSAB...97...26D. doi:10.1130/0016-7606(1986)97<26:AMDFRE>2.0.CO;2. ISSN 0016-7606.
- Gee, David G.; Johansson, Åke; Ohta, Yoshihide; Tebenkov, Alexander M.; Krasilshchikov, Alexander A.; Balashov, Yuri A.; Larionov, Alexander N.; Gannibal, Ludmila F.; Ryungenen, Genrich I. (1995). "Grenvillian basement and a major unconformity within the Caledonides of Nordaustlandet, Svalbard". Precambrian Research. 70 (3–4): 215–234. Bibcode:1995PreR...70..215G. doi:10.1016/0301-9268(94)00041-O.
- Gee, D. G.; Beliakova, L.; Pease, V.; Larionov, A.; Dovshikova, L. (2000). "New, single zircon (Pb-evaporation) ages from Vendian intrusions in the basement beneath the Pechora Basin, northeastern Baltica. Polarforschung" (PDF). 68: 161–170.
- Vernikovsky, Valery A.; Pease, Victoria L.; Vernikovskaya, Antonina E.; Romanov, Andrey P.; Gee, David G.; Travin, Alexey V. (2003). "First report of early Triassic A-type granite and syenite intrusions from Taimyr: Product of the northern Eurasian superplume?". Lithos. 66 (1–2): 23–36. Bibcode:2003Litho..66...23V. doi:10.1016/S0024-4937(02)00192-5.
- Vernikovsky, V. A.; Vernikovskaya, A. E.; Pease, V. L.; Gee, D. G. (2004). "Neoproterozoic Orogeny along the margins of Siberia". Geological Society, London, Memoirs. 30: 233–248. doi:10.1144/GSL.MEM.2004.030.01.18. S2CID 129431581.
- Larionov, Alexander N.; Andreichev, V. A.; Gee, D. G. (2004). "The Vendian alkaline igneous suite of northern Timan: Ion microprobe U-Pb zircon ages of gabbros and syenite". Geological Society, London, Memoirs. 30: 69–74. doi:10.1144/GSL.MEM.2004.030.01.07. S2CID 128417358.
- Gee, D. G.; Pease, V. (2004). "The Neoproterozoic Timanide Orogen of eastern Baltica: Introduction". Geological Society, London, Memoirs. 30: 1–3. doi:10.1144/GSL.MEM.2004.030.01.01. S2CID 129465425.
- Pease, V.; Dovzhikova, E.; Beliakova, L.; Gee, D. G. (2004). "Late Neoproterozoic granitoid magmatism in the basement to the Pechora Basin, NW Russia: Geochemical constraints indicate westward subduction beneath NE Baltica". Geological Society, London, Memoirs. 30: 75–85. doi:10.1144/GSL.MEM.2004.030.01.08. S2CID 129323514.
- Gee, D. G.; Teben'kov, A. M. (2004). "Svalbard: A fragment of the Laurentian margin". Geological Society, London, Memoirs. 30: 191–206. doi:10.1144/GSL.MEM.2004.030.01.16. S2CID 129688475.
- Lorenz, Henning; Gee, David G.; Larionov, Alexander N.; Majka, Jaroslaw (2012). "The Grenville–Sveconorwegian orogen in the high Arctic". Geological Magazine. 149 (5): 875–891. Bibcode:2012GeoM..149..875L. doi:10.1017/S0016756811001130. S2CID 128895327.
- Gee, David G.; Janák, Marian; Majka, Jarosław; Robinson, Peter; Van Roermund, Herman (2013). "Subduction along and within the Baltoscandian margin during closing of the Iapetus Ocean and Baltica-Laurentia collision". Lithosphere. 5 (2): 169–178. Bibcode:2013Lsphe...5..169G. doi:10.1130/L220.1.

=== Books and monographs ===
- Gee, David G.; Sturt, B. A., eds. (1985). The Caledonide Orogen: Scandinavia and Related Areas. John Wiley & Sons Ltd. ISBN 047110504X. LCCN 84017275; 1,266 pages
  - 1986 edition (2 volumes). Wiley; hardcover, 1,298 pages
- Gee, D.G.; Zeyen, H.J., eds. (1996). Lithosphere dynamics : origin and evolution of continents / Europrobe. Uppsala, Sweden: Europrobe secretariate. LCCN 2002438180; 138 pages, illustrations in colour
- Gee, David G.; Pease, Victoria, eds. (2004). The Neoproterozoic Timanide Orogen Of Eastern Baltica. Geological Society Memoirs, No. 30. Geological Society Of London. ISBN 1862391726. LCCN 2005434265; hardcover, 255 pages, illustrated
- Gee, D. G.; Stephenson, R. A., eds. (2006). European Lithosphere Dynamics. Geological Society Memoir no. 32. London; Bath: Geological Society of London. ISBN 9781862392120. LCCN 2007274602; vii + 662 pp.
