= Martin Harris (linguist) =

British linguist (born 1944)

Sir Martin Harris CBE

7th President of Clare Hall, Cambridge
- In office 2008–2013
- Preceded by: Ekhard Salje
- Succeeded by: David Ibbetson

Chancellor of the University of Salford
- In office 2007–2009
- Preceded by: Sir Walter Bodmer
- Succeeded by: Irene Khan

Vice-Chancellor of the Victoria University of Manchester
- In office 1992–2004

Vice-Chancellor of the University of Essex
- In office 1987–1992
- Preceded by: Sir Albert Sloman
- Succeeded by: Ron Johnston

Personal details
- Born: Martin Best Harris; 28 June 1944 (age 81) Ruabon, Wales

Sir Martin Best Harris, CBE (born 28 June 1944) is a British academic and former university vice-chancellor.

== Life and career ==
He was born at Ruabon, Wales, the son of William Best Harris, afterwards City Librarian of Plymouth, and educated at Devonport High School for Boys in Plymouth, at Queens' College, Cambridge and at the School of Oriental and African Studies. He began his academic career at the University of Leicester in 1967, where he lectured in French Linguistics.

He spent fifteen years at the University of Salford as a Senior Lecturer, Professor of Linguistics, Dean and, later, Pro-Vice-Chancellor. From 1984 to 1987 he was a member of the University Grants Committee.

His first appointment as Vice-Chancellor was at the University of Essex in 1987, where he succeeded the founding Vice-Chancellor, Albert Sloman.

His most prominent academic appointment was Vice-Chancellor of the Victoria University of Manchester from 1992 until its dissolution in the formation of the new University of Manchester in 2004. During his time in Manchester he also at various times Chairman of both the Committee of Vice-Chancellors and Principals (now UUK), and of its Health Committee, a member of the Commission for Health Improvement and a member of the Department of Health – Department for Education and Skills Strategic Learning and Research Advisory Group: StLAR, and Chair of the Clinical Academic Staff Advisory Group of the Universities and Colleges Employers Association.

Harris' appointments since retirement from the University of Manchester include Deputy Chairmanship of the North West Development Agency 2002–2008, Director of Fair Access at the Office for Fair Access (OFFA) 2004–2012, and Chancellor of the University of Salford between 2005 and 2009.

He became President of Clare Hall, Cambridge in 2008 and stepped down in 2013.

== Books ==
- Martin Harris (1978) The Evolution of French Syntax. A Comparative Approach. London: Longman.
- Nigel Vincent & Martin Harris (eds) (1982) Studies in the Romance Verb: Essays Offered to Joe Cremona on the Occasion of his 60th Birthday. London: Croom Helm.
- Martin Harris & Nigel Vincent (eds) (1988) The Romance Languages. London: Croom Helm. (2nd ed. London: Taylor & Francis, 1997).

== Past positions ==
- Vice-Chancellor of the University of Essex from 1987 to 1992.
- Vice-Chancellor of the Victoria University of Manchester from 1992 until 2004.
- Chairman of review of graduate education in England and Wales (the Harris Report) 1995-96.
- Chairman of the Clinical Standards Advisory Group 1996.
- Chairman of the Committee of Vice-Chancellors and Principals (CVCP), now Universities UK, from 1997 until 1999.
- Founding Chair of the North West Universities Association 1999–2001.
- Chairman of a review of university careers services for the Department for Education and Skills 2000.
- Commissioner for Health Improvement 1999–2002.
- Honorary President of the National Postgraduate Committee 2001–2004
- Deputy Chair of the North West Development Agency 2002–2008
- Director of Fair Access at the Office for Fair Access (OFFA) 2004–2012
- Chairman of Universities Superannuation Scheme Limited 2006–2015
- President of Clare Hall, Cambridge 2008–2013

== Present positions ==
- Honorary Fellow of Queens' College, Cambridge.

== Honours ==
HM The Queen appointed Professor Harris Commander of the Most Excellent Order of the British Empire in 1992 and Knight Bachelor in her New Year Honours List 2000 for services to higher education.

The Martin Harris Centre for Music and Drama at the University of Manchester is named in his honour.

Academic offices
Preceded by Sir Albert Sloman	Vice-Chancellor of the University of Essex; 1987–1992	Succeeded by Ron Johnston
Preceded by Professor Sir Walter Bodmer	Chancellor of the University of Salford; 2007–2009	Succeeded by Dr Irene Khan
Preceded by Ekhard Salje	President of Clare Hall, Cambridge; 2008–2013	Succeeded by David Ibbetson
Preceded by Sir Mark Richmond	Vice-Chancellor of The University of Manchester; 1992–2004	Succeeded by Alan Gilbert
