= Richard J. Harrison (mineralogist) =

British mineralogist

- Born: England
- Citizenship: United Kingdom
- Education: University of Cambridge
- Awards: Max Hey medal, Gilbert Medal, Mineralogical Society of America Award
- Scientific career
- Fields: Mineralogy, Earth Sciences, Magnetism
- Workplaces: University of Cambridge
- Doctoral advisors: Andrew Putnis
- Website: https://www.esc.cam.ac.uk/directory/richard-harrison

Richard J. Harrison is a professor in the Department of Earth Sciences, University of Cambridge and director of Studies for Earth and Mineral Sciences at St. Catharine's College, University of Cambridge. He works in the field of palaeomagnetism.

== Early career ==
Harrison began his scientific career at the University of Cambridge, graduating in Mineral Sciences and then working as a postgraduate student under the guidance of Andrew Putnis. His Ph.D. work, on magnetic and cation ordering in spinels, was followed by further studies into the relationships between magnetic properties and microstructure of minerals carried out at the Institut für Mineralogie in Münster and funded through personal Alexander von Humboldt and Marie Curie fellowships. He later returned to Cambridge where he worked as a NERC Advanced Research Fellow and in August 2019 was appointed as the Head of Department, where he is also head of the NanoPaleoMagnetism group.

== Honours and awards ==
In 2003 Harrison received the Max Hey Medal from the Mineralogical Society of Great Britain and Ireland.

In 2006 Harrison received the William Gilbert Award from the American Geophysical Union.

In 2007 Harrison received the Mineralogical Society of America Award.

Academic offices
Preceded by Simon Redfern	Head of Department of Earth Sciences, University of Cambridge; 2019 - 2024	Succeeded by Marie Edmonds
