= Simon Redfern =

- Occupations: Mineralogist, geoscientist and academic

Academic background
- Education: BA, mineral sciences MA; PhD; MBA
- Alma mater: University of Cambridge; University of Illinois, Urbana-Champaign

Academic work
- Institutions: Jesus College, Cambridge; Nanyang Technological University

Simon Redfern is a mineralogist, geoscientist and academic. He is the dean of the College of Science, the President's Chair in Earth Sciences, and a professor at Nanyang Technological University (NTU), Singapore as well as an emeritus professorial fellow at Jesus College, University of Cambridge.

Redfern's research spans the atomic-scale and microscopic structure of minerals and their relationship with environmental science and sustainability, ranging from biominerals to materials for clean energy and greenhouse gas reduction. He is the recipient of numerous awards, including the European Mineralogical Society's Medal for Research Excellence (1997), and is the first person to have been presented with both the Max Hey (1994) and the Neumann Medals of the Mineralogical Society of Great Britain and Ireland (2012).

Redfern is a fellow of the Geological Society of London and the Mineralogical Society of America. He has also held editorial roles such as chief editor of Frontiers in Earth Sciences: Earth & Planetary Materials and editor of Geochemical Perspective Letters.

== Education ==
Redfern graduated with a BA in mineral sciences in 1985, followed by an MA and a PhD in 1989, all from the University of Cambridge Department of Earth Sciences. In 2022, he was enrolled at the University of Illinois, Urbana-Champaign, receiving an MBA in 2024.

== Career ==
Redfern began working as a temporary lecturer in mineral physics/chemistry at the University of Cambridge in 1988 and as a lecturer in geochemical spectroscopy at the University of Manchester in 1989. In 1994, he was appointed university lecturer in mineralogy at Cambridge, later becoming reader in mineral physics in 2000, and professor from 2005 to 2019. Concurrently, he assumed the role of head of the Department of Earth Sciences in 2016 and has been an emeritus professorial fellow at Jesus College since 2019. He joined Nanyang Technological University (NTU) in 2019, holding the positions of dean of the College of Science, President's Chair in Earth Sciences, and professor in the Asian School of the Environment as well as the School of Materials Science and Engineering. His appointments extended to the National University of Singapore, where he has been a management board member of the Singapore Nuclear Research and Safety Initiative since 2020.

Redfern has been affiliated with professional organizations, starting in 1997 as vice president of the Mineralogical Society, while also being founder and chairman of its Mineral Physics Group (1997–1999). He served on the Council of the Mineralogical Society of America and the High-Pressure Commission of the International Union of Crystallography (2005–2009), later becoming its treasurer (2009–2015). Additionally, he contributed to the Institut Laue Langevin in France (2010–2013), along with British agencies such as the Natural Environment Research Council (2012–2017), and the UK Government Advisory Committee on Radioactive Waste Disposal (2016–18). Subsequently, he was appointed visiting scientist at HPSTAR, Beijing (2016–2019) and chair of the American Geophysical Union (AGU) Robert C. Cowen Award Committee (2018–2021).

Redfern has also been engaged in journalistic work, primarily with the BBC and the British Science Association, having written several articles on science news topics as a science media fellow in 2013. In 2018, he was interviewed by Al-Jazeera on the Anak Krakatoa eruption, and has appeared on the radio. His articles have also been published by other news sources, such as The Huffington Post and The Independent.

== Research ==
Redfern has contributed to the field of geoscience and materials science by employing experimental and computational methods to investigate the physical and chemical properties of minerals and associated fluids in planetary interiors.

=== Crystallography ===
Redfern's work on crystallography has focused on the structure and properties of various materials. In a highly cited study with T.J.B. Holland, he demonstrated using regression diagnostics with nonlinear least-squares to improve cell parameter refinement from powder diffraction data.

Alongside colleagues, Redfern explored lowering the melting temperatures of 3D metal–organic frameworks (MOFs) by altering their chemistry, enabling the formation of unique MOF glasses that retain metal-ligand connectivity and offer new tunable functionalities. Furthermore, he examined multiferroic bismuth ferrite BiFeO_{3}, revealing novel phase transitions, refining the phase diagram, and providing insights into band structure and conductivity behavior, diverging from previous reports.

=== Catalysis ===
Redfern delved into catalysis and materials science, leading to the development of novel electrocatalysts. He introduced ruthenium-activated hollow carbon sphere catalysts, demonstrating superior performance in alkaline electrochemical water splitting compared to commercial Pt/C, providing a cost-effective alternative for large-scale hydrogen production. His work also proposed polymer carbon dots (PCDs) as efficient, metal-free room-temperature phosphorescence materials, emphasizing their unique RTP properties and potential for easy synthesis and diverse applications.

=== Energy conversion ===
Through joint research, Redfern showcased how cesium-based trihalide perovskite solar cell efficiency could be enhanced by modifying the CsPbI_{2}Br absorber and polythiophene hole-acceptor interface, reducing energy losses and achieving high power conversion efficiency. In a similar study, he analyzed how high pressure boosts the optical activity of cesium lead halide perovskite nanocrystals, revealing a pressure-induced emission phenomenon due to structural changes.

== Awards and honors ==
- 1994 – Max Hey Medal, Mineralogical Society of Great Britain and Ireland
- 1997 – Medal for Research Excellence, European Mineralogical Society
- 2012 – Neumann Medal, Mineralogical Society of Great Britain and Ireland

== Selected articles ==
- Holland, T. J. B., & Redfern, S. A. T. (1997). Unit cell refinement from powder diffraction data: the use of regression diagnostics. Mineralogical Magazine, 61(404), 65–77.
- Palai, R., Katiyar, R. S., Schmid, H., Tissot, P., Clark, S. J., Robertson, J., ... & Scott, J. F. (2008). β phase and γ− β metal-insulator transition in multiferroic Bi Fe O 3. Physical Review B, 77(1), 014110.
- Li, W., Liu, Y., Wu, M., Feng, X., Redfern, S. A., Shang, Y., ... & Yang, B. (2018). Carbon‐quantum‐dots‐loaded ruthenium nanoparticles as an efficient electrocatalyst for hydrogen production in alkaline media. Advanced Materials, 30(31), 1800676.
- Tao, S., Lu, S., Geng, Y., Zhu, S., Redfern, S. A., Song, Y., ... & Yang, B. (2018). Design of metal‐free polymer carbon dots: a new class of room‐temperature phosphorescent materials. Angewandte Chemie International Edition, 57(9), 2393–2398.
- Zeng, Q., Zhang, X., Feng, X., Lu, S., Chen, Z., Yong, X., ... & Yang, B. (2018). Polymer‐passivated inorganic cesium lead mixed‐halide perovskites for stable and efficient solar cells with high open‐circuit voltage over 1.3 V. Advanced materials, 30(9), 1705393.
- Li, X., Wang, Y., Fu, Y., Redfern, S. A., Jiang, S., Zhu, P., & Cui, T. (2024). Stabilization of High‐Pressure Phase of Face‐Centered Cubic Lutetium Trihydride at Ambient Conditions. Advanced Science, 2401642.

Academic offices
Preceded by James A. Jackson	Head of Department of Earth Sciences, University of Cambridge; 2016 - 2019	Succeeded by Richard J. Harrison
