= Albert Sloman =

British university teacher (1921–2012)

Sir Albert Edward Sloman (1921 – 28 July 2012) was the founding and longest serving Vice Chancellor of the University of Essex, UK.

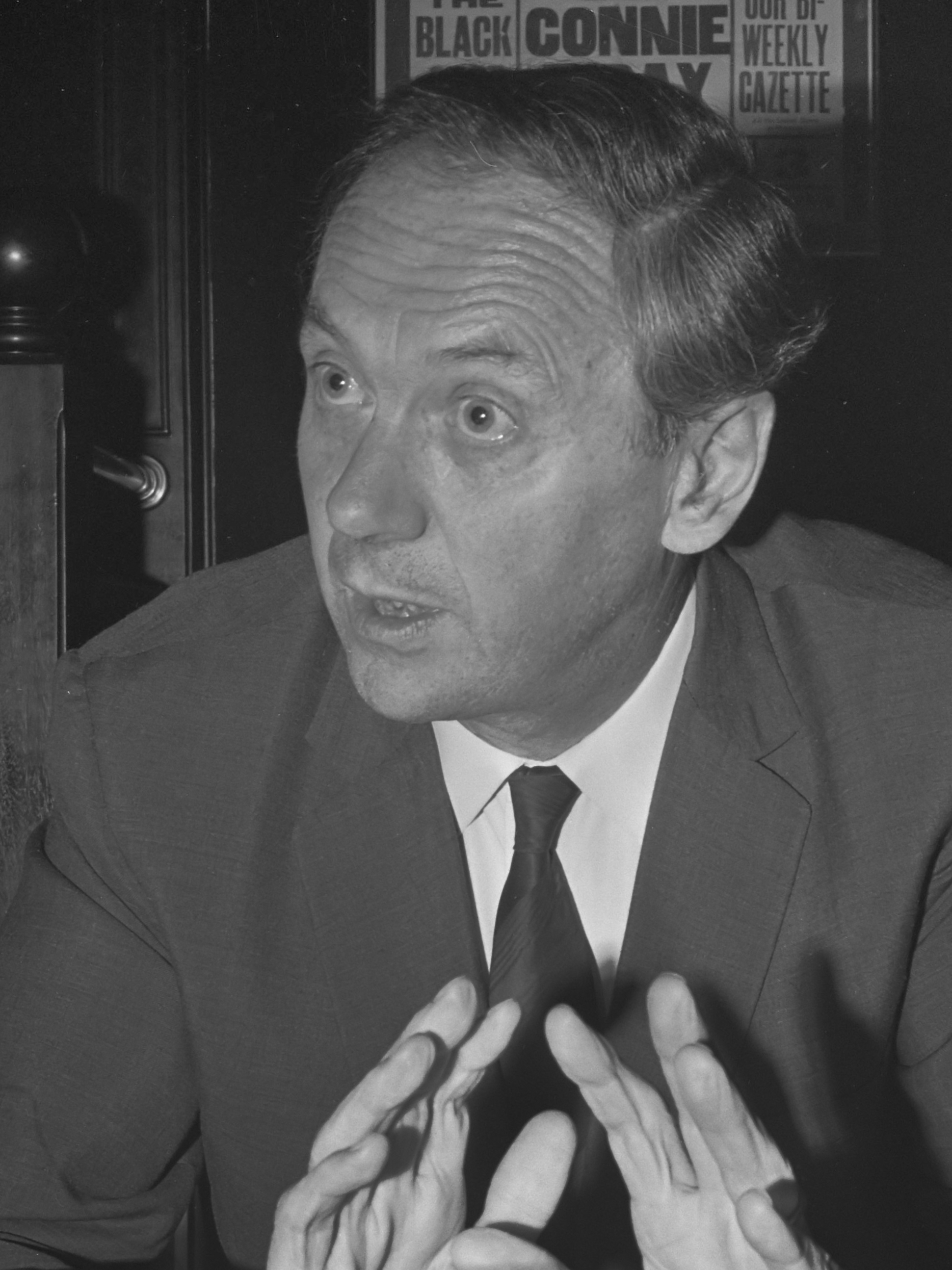
Albert Edward Sloman (1974)

== Background ==
Albert Sloman was born in Cornwall and educated at Launceston College, before attending Wadham College, Oxford in 1939, where he secured a scholarship to study Spanish and French. After two years’ study he fought with the RAF as a night-fighter pilot, returned to Oxford in 1945 to finish his degree and begin a doctorate. His thesis topic was Pedro Calderón de la Barca's El príncipe constante. However, after a year he took up an Instructorship in Spanish at the University of California, Berkeley. He went on to work at Trinity College Dublin and held the chair in Spanish from 1953 to 1962 at Liverpool University, latterly becoming the Dean of the Faculty of Arts.

== Contributions ==
In May 1960 the University Grants Committee voted to establish the University of Essex. In 1962, at the age of 41, Sloman was appointed the first Vice Chancellor. He was drawn to the philosophy and structure of leading American universities, and was given government funding to establish and run the university. He retired as Vice Chancellor in 1987 after twenty five years.

He delivered the 1963 BBC Reith Lectures on ‘The Making of a University’. He outlined plans for "radical innovation" - a high level of research and scholarship, with an inter-disciplinary curriculum. Departments would be headed by leading academics on a rotating basis so that they could maintain their research. He recruited young academics to establish the new departments, including the economist Richard Lipsey, the sociologist Peter Townsend, the political scientist Jean Blondel and the literary critic, Donald Davie. His initiation of taught master's degrees was unusual in the 1960s. All undergraduates would sample a broad range of courses cutting across the science/arts divide in their first year before specialising. In the humanities and social sciences, students should study countries other than Great Britain. There was a lack of hierarchy in the buildings, open spaces, and dining arrangements. Some of Sloman's vision has survived.

Sloman chaired the Conference of European Rectors and Vice Chancellors from 1969 to 1974, and the Committee of Vice Chancellors and Principals, from 1981 to 1983, when the Thatcher administration cut funding significantly to British universities.

== Controversies ==
In 1966 the UGC, antagonised by the university's commitment to research, savagely cut the planned expansion of student numbers. In 1968, six years of political protest began on campus, detailed by sporadic student unrest, supported by many staff. On 7 May 1968 Police with dogs were called to a demonstration against chemical and biological warfare at a lecture by chemical defence scientist Dr Thomas Inch, a government scientist from Porton Down. On Friday, 10 May, three students, Pete Archard, Raphael Halberstadt and David Triesman (now Lord Triesman) were suspended by Sloman and ordered off the campus. No evidence or charges were notified to the students, and no opportunity was given for the students to present their defence. Students retaliated with protest, blockading his house, boycotting the university's lectures and organising their own. After a week the three students were reinstated. The protests, continuing into 1969, continued unrest on the Colchester campus. There was negative press reporting, and there were calls for closure of the university from the populist right, and attacks on Sloman from the left. By 1974 there was a student ‘Occupation’ lasting several weeks, and the students were discouraging others from studying there, with attacks directed at Sloman The university's reputation was damaged in this period, and enrolments fell. Over the next 13 years, Sloman fought to reestablish the reputation of the university.

== Personal ==
Sloman was married with three daughters. His wife Marie, was from Cognac in France, where they had a house. He was knighted after retirement, in 1988.

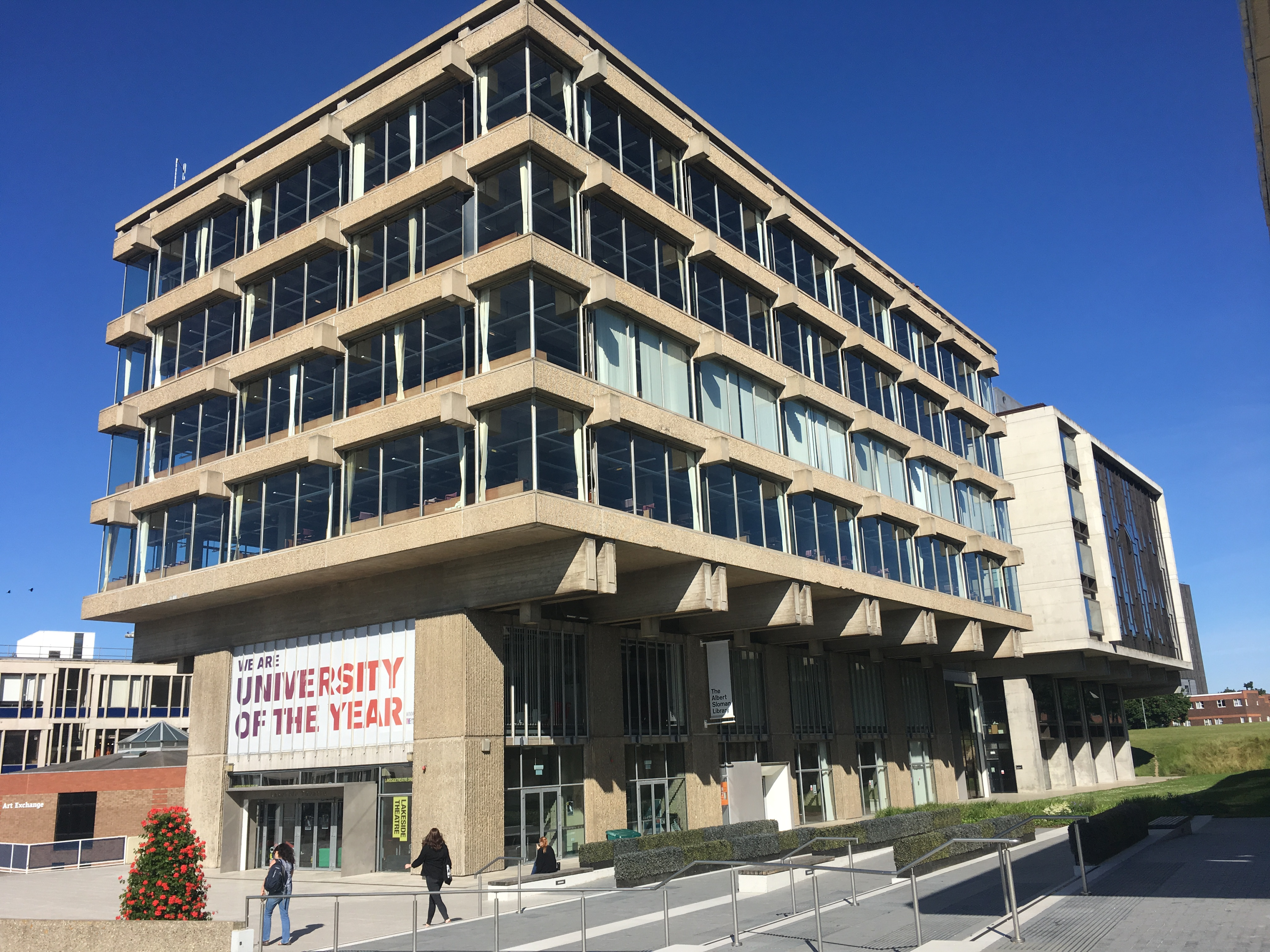
The Albert Sloman Library

The University of Essex's library building is named after him. It was extended in 2015.

== Sources ==
Academic offices
New title	Vice-Chancellor of the University of Essex; 1962–1987	Succeeded by Sir Martin Harris
