= Ekhard Salje =

German minearologist (1946–2025)

Professor Ekhard K. H. Salje FRS

Personal details
- Born: Hanover
- Died: 24 February 2025

6th President of Clare Hall, Cambridge
- In office 2001–2008
- Preceded by: Dame Gillian Beer
- Succeeded by: Sir Martin Harris

Ekhard Karl Hermann Salje, FRS (1946-2025) was an Emeritus Professor, and formerly Professor of Mineralogy and Petrology and Head of the Department of Earth Sciences, Cambridge University.

== Education and career ==
Ekhard Salje completed his University Teacher’s Dissertation in 1972, and by 1983 was the Head of Department at the Institute for Crystallography and Petrology at the Leibniz University Hannover. In 1985 he moved to Cambridge where was awarded a Professorship in Mineral Physics in the Department of Earth Sciences in 1992. He worked jointly in the Department of Physics Cavendish Laboratory.

In 1998 he assumed the post of Head of Department of Earth Sciences, University of Cambridge, which he retained until October 2008.

In October 2001 he became President of Clare Hall, a post he held until 2008 when he was succeeded by Sir Martin Harris.

=== Research ===
Professor Salje's research was focused in the field of mineralogy and mineral physics using approaches that combine theoretical and experimental methods. In particular, he was concerned with the stability of minerals and the transformation processes that occur within them in response to changes in temperature and pressure. His work included the study of structural phase transitions, the formation of polaronic states in transition metal oxides like WO_{3}, and ferroelasticity. The dynamics of phase transitions includes the movements of nano-domains which progress as avalanches in most cases. He discovered avalanche behaviour by experiment and computer simulation in ferroelastics, ferroelectrics and martensitic alloys. His work in the field of mineral physics was rewarded in 1996 when he was elected a Fellow of the Royal Society. This was followed by his election as Chevalier dans l’ordre des Palmes Academiques (France) in 2004, and the award of the Cross of the Order of Merit of the Federal Republic of Germany in 2007. He was fellow of the Leopoldina (Nat. Academy of Germany) and the Royal Society of the Arts and Sciences of Barcelona.

He was the co-author of a Royal Society report on nuclear waste and was chairman of the Steering Committee of the National Institute for Environmental e-Sciences. As Programme Director of the Cambridge-MIT Institute he was responsible for joint research in the field of Future Technologies. He was chairman of the Cambridge e-science Centre and chairman of the steering committee of the Cambridge Environmental Initiative (CEI) which advises on environmental research in Cambridge. He was president of the British branch of the Alexander von Humboldt Association. He was chairman of the Cambridge European Trust, member of the Wissenschaftsrat (Germany), Int. Advisory Board of the Alexander von Humboldt Foundation (Germany), and the Parliamentary Office for Science and Technology (UK).

Professor Salje was visiting professor in Japan, Max Planck Institute for Mathematics in the Sciences in Leipzig, University of Paris VI, Bilbao, Grenoble, Le Mans. He was honorary Professor at Xi'an Jiaotong University (China) and Ulam fellow at the Los Alamos National Laboratory.

== Selected bibliography ==
He published over 700 scientific papers and 3 books.

== Awards ==
- Fellow of Leopoldina (German Academy of Natural Sciences), 1994
- Abraham-Gottlob-Werner medal in mineralogy, 1994
- Fellow of the Royal Society, 1996
- Mombusho Professor, Institute of Physics and Geological Society, Japan, 1996
- Schlumberger medal of the Mineralogical Society, 1998
- Humboldt Research Prize, 2000
- Honorary Fellow of Darwin College, Cambridge, 2001
- Ernst Ising prize for Physics, 2002
- Gold medal of the University of Hamburg, 2002
- Chevalier dans l’ordre des Palmes Academiques, 2004
- Agricola medal for Applied Mineralogy, 2006
- Order of Merit of the Federal Republic of Germany, first class (Germany), 2006
- Foreign member of the Royal Soc. of Barcelona for Arts and Sciences, 2010
- Honorary Professor, Jiao-Tong University, China, 2012
- Werner Heisenberg medal 2017
- Honorary PhD (Dr. h.c.) University of Wuerzburg, 2019
- Hon. Senator (Ehrensenator) University of Wuerzburg, 2020
- Member Academia Europaea, 2021
- Friendship award and medal, China, 2024
- Honorary PhD (Dr. h.c.) Leibniz University Hanover, 2024

Academic offices
Preceded by Dame Gillian Beer	President of Clare Hall, Cambridge; 2001-2008	Succeeded by Sir Martin Harris
Preceded by Nick McCave	Head of Department of Earth Sciences, University of Cambridge; 1998 - 2008	Succeeded by James A. Jackson
Preceded by E.R. Oxburgh	Professor of Mineralogy and Petrology, University of Cambridge; 1994-2014	Succeeded by N.J. Tosca
