= List of fellows of the Royal Society elected in 2001 =

This article lists fellows of the Royal Society elected in 2001.

== Fellows ==
1. David Ian Attwell
2. David Baulcombe
3. John Beddington
4. Tim Berners-Lee
5. Robert J. Birgeneau
6. Dick Bond
7. Hugh Bostock
8. Keith Burnett
9. Paul Callaghan
10. Graham Leon Collingridge
11. James F. Crow
12. Richard Clinton Dawkins
13. Roger Philip Ekins
14. Harry Elderfield
15. Anthony G. Evans
16. Brian Leonard Eyre
17. Peter Gluckman
18. Charles Godfray
19. Brigid L M Hogan
20. John David Hunt
21. Frances Kirwan
22. Shrinivas R Kulkarni
23. Andrew Greig William Leslie
24. Michael Levitt
25. Robin Lovell-Badge
26. Paul Anthony Madden
27. Patrick Moore (Honorary FRS)
28. Michael Stewart Paterson
29. Bruce Anthony John Ponder
30. Geoffrey Raisman
31. Allan Sandage
32. Dale Sanders
33. David William Schindler
34. George M. Sheldrick
35. Sheila Sherlock
36. Thomas James Simpson
37. Adrian Frederick Melhuish Smith
38. Mandyam Veerambudi Srinivasan
39. Ian Nicholas Stewart
40. Roger Ian Tanner
41. Marc Trevor Tessier-Lavigne
42. Nicholas Kester Tonks
43. William George Unruh
44. Bryan Webber
45. Alex Wilkie

== Foreign members ==
1. Alexei Abrikosov
2. Alan Fowler
3. Clara Franzini-Armstrong
4. Ahmed Zewail
