= Roger R. Fu =

Roger R. Fu is an American researcher of paleomagnetism. He was awarded a James B. Macelwane Medal of the American Geophysical Union in 2025 and a William Gilbert Award in 2020.
