= Sabine Stanley =

Canadian physicist

- Occupation: Professor
- Awards: William Gilbert Award of the AGU in 2010; Sloan Research Fellow, Alfred P. Sloan Foundation in 2011; Dean's Outstanding Teaching Award from the University of Toronto

Academic background
- Education: PhD & MA in Geophysics; BSc in Astronomy and Physics
- Alma mater: University of Toronto (B.Sc., 1999); Harvard University (M.A., 2003, Ph.D., 2004)

Academic work
- Discipline: Planetary Science
- Institutions: Johns Hopkins University

Sabine Stanley is a Canadian physicist, currently at Johns Hopkins University in the Zanvyl Krieger School of Arts and Sciences Morton K. Blaustein Department of Earth And Planetary Sciences and the Applied Physics Laboratory. She was awarded a Bloomberg Distinguished Professorship in 2017. She was previously a Canada Research Chair of Planetary Physics at University of Toronto. She was awarded the William Gilbert Award by the AGU in 2010 and was awarded a Sloan Research Fellowship in 2011.

== Education ==
Sabine Stanley earned a Bachelors of Science in Astronomy and Physics from University of Toronto in 1999. She subsequently earned a Masters in Geophysics in 2003 and a PhD in Geophysics in 2004 from Harvard University.

== Career ==
After the awarding of her PhD at Harvard, Dr. Sabine Stanley worked as a postdoctoral researcher with Maria Zuber from 2004 to 2005 in the Department of Earth, Atmospheric & Planetary Sciences at the Massachusetts Institute of Technology prior to returning to Canada and the University of Toronto as an Assistant Professor in the Department of Physics. She was promoted to an Associate Professor with tenure in 2010, and to full professor in 2015. From 2015 to 2016, Stanley also served as the Associate Chair for Undergraduate Studies in the Department of Physics. Stanley joined Johns Hopkins University as a Bloomberg Distinguished Professor in 2017. She has appointments in the Department of Earth and Planetary Sciences in the Zanvyl Krieger School of Arts and Sciences and in the Space Exploration Sector of the Applied Physics Laboratory. Stanley leads the Magnetism & Planetary Interiors (MagPI) research group. In 2023, Stanley was named vice provost for graduate and professional education at Johns Hopkins University.

== Honors ==
Stanley's awards and honors include the Dean's Outstanding Teaching Award and the Ranjini Ghosh Excellence in Teaching Award from the University of Toronto. In 2010, Dr. Stanley was awarded the William Gilbert Award from the American Geophysical Union for her major theoretical contributions to the study of planetary magnetism and the use of dynamo theory. In 2011, she was amongst the 118 Sloan Foundation fellowship recipients, specifically in Physics and was one of only three Canadian awardees that year.
