= Suzanne M. McEnroe =

American geologist

- Education: University of Massachusetts Amherst
- Known for: Rock magnetism
- Awards: William Gilbert Award
- Scientific career
- Workplaces: Geological Survey of Norway, University of Oslo, Norwegian University of Science and Technology
- Thesis: Paleomagnetism of Mesozoic intrusions in New England (1993)

Suzanne M. McEnroe is a geophysics professor at the Norwegian University of Science and Technology. She works on the fundamental magnetic properties of rocks and minerals.

== Biography ==
McEnroe studied geology at the University of Massachusetts Amherst and earned her Ph.D. in 1993. She worked as postdoctoral fellow at Lund University in Sweden. From 1993 to 1994 she was adjunct assistant professor at Amherst, from 1994 to 1995 a postdoctoral fellow at the Geological Survey of Norway, before she came back to Amherst as research assistant professor from 1995 to 1998. From 1996 to 2004 she worked as senior geophysicist at the Geological Survey of Norway in Trondheim. From 2002 to 2003 she was a visiting senior scientist at the Commonwealth Scientific and Industrial Research Organization in North Ryde, Australia. From 2004 to 2012 she worked as a research professor at the Geological Survey of Norway and joined the University of Oslo as a professor in 2009. From 2009 to 2010 she was also a Marie Curie fellow at the University of Bayreuth in Germany. Since 2012, she has benn professor at the Norwegian University of Science and Technology in Trondheim.

== Research ==
Suzanne M. McEnroes research is focusing on the magnetic behaviour of crustal rocks at all scales. She has conducted research on crustal magnetic anomaly sources, which applies to Earth and planetary sciences.

She serves as president of the Geomagnetism, Paleomagnetism and Electromagnetism section of the American Geophysical Union and is an elected fellow of the Mineralogical Society of America, the Geological Society of America and the Japanese Society for the Promotion of Science. In 2009 she gave the Bullard Lecture at the American Geophysical Union, in 2019 she won the William Gilbert Award. She is also a member of the Royal Norwegian Society of Sciences and Letters and the Norwegian Academy of Technical Sciences.
