= Godwin Laboratory, University of Cambridge =

Research facility at the University of Cambridge

Coordinates: 52.2030°N 0.1221°E

The Godwin Laboratory is a research facility at the University of Cambridge. It was originally set up to investigate radiocarbon dating and its applications, and was one of the first laboratories to determine a radiocarbon calibration curve. The lab is named after the English scientist Harry Godwin.

== History ==
With the late Professor Sir Nicholas Shackleton in charge, the focus of research shifted to marine isotope records, which document changes in the size of polar ice sheets and temperature changes. This research helped to establish the Milankovitch Theory as the most plausible explanation of glacial/interglacial changes over the past million years, and was continued to develop much more extensive geological timescales, covering the last 30 million years, on the basis of this hypothesis. Other areas researched by members of the laboratory include pollen records and tree rings as a proxy for past climate. The laboratory changed principal allegiance from the Department of Plant Sciences to the Department of Earth Sciences around 1995.

In 2005, after Nick Shackleton's retirement, the laboratory was incorporated into the building housing the Department of Earth Sciences, where it continues to operate. It is part of the inter-departmental Godwin Institute for Quaternary Research, a loose collection of Cambridge University research facilities and workers focused on research particularly addressing the history of the last 1.8 million years.
