= Ronald Oxburgh, Baron Oxburgh =

British geologist (born 1934)

The Right Honourable The Lord Oxburgh KBE FRS HonFREng
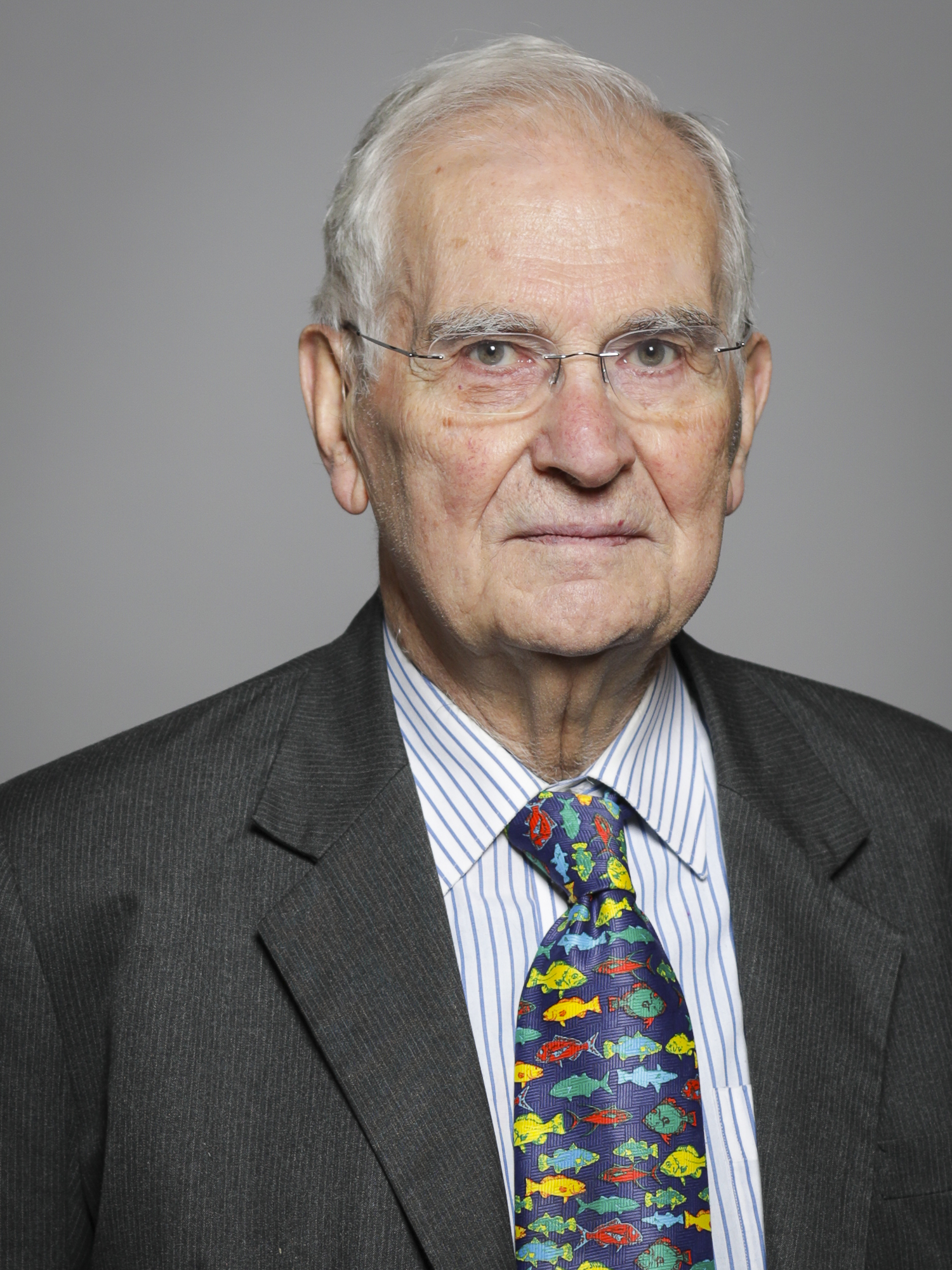
- Born: 2 November 1934 (age 92)
- Education: University College, Oxford; Princeton University
- Spouse(s): Ursula, Lady Oxburgh
- Children: 3
- Awards: Bigsby Medal (1979)
- Scientific career
- Thesis: Geology of the eastern Carabobo area, Venezuela (1960)
- Doctoral advisor: Harry Hammond Hess

Member of the House of Lords
- Lord Temporal
- Life peerage 27 July 1999 – 28 April 2022

Ernest Ronald Oxburgh, Baron Oxburgh (born 2 November 1934) is an English geologist, geophysicist and politician. Lord Oxburgh is well known for his work as a public advocate in both academia and the business world in addressing the need to reduce carbon dioxide emissions and develop alternative energy sources as well as his negative views on the consequences of current oil consumption.

== Early life ==
Oxburgh was born in Liverpool on 2 November 1934. He remained there with his family throughout World War II, despite Luftwaffe air raids. He attended Liverpool Institute High School for Boys from 1942 to 1950. He is a graduate of University College, Oxford and Princeton University (PhD) (1960) where he worked on the emerging theory of plate tectonics with the famous geologist Harry Hammond Hess.

== Career ==
Oxburgh has taught geology and geophysics at the Universities of Oxford and Cambridge. At Cambridge he was Professor of Mineralogy and Petrology, head of the Department of Earth Sciences and President of Queens' College. He has been a visiting professor at Stanford, Caltech, and Cornell. From 1988 to 1993, Lord Oxburgh was chief scientific adviser to the Ministry of Defence, and Rector of Imperial College London from 1993 to 2000. He was a member of the National Committee of Inquiry into Higher Education that published an influential report in 1997.

During 2004–05 Oxburgh was a non-executive chairman of Shell, the UK arm of Royal Dutch Shell. His tenure was remarkable in that while chairing a fossil fuels giant he expressed his "fears for the planet" because of climate change, sought new energy sources, and urged the global community to reduce greenhouse gas emissions.

Lord Oxburgh was appointed Deputy Chairman of the Science and Engineering Research Council (Singapore), as of 1 January 2002, and is a member of the International Academic Advisory Panel of Singapore and the University Grants Committee (Hong Kong). He is honorary president of the Carbon Capture and Storage Association, chairman of Falck Renewables, a wind energy firm, an advisor to Climate Change Capital. He was chairman of D1 Oils, plc, a biodiesel producer, in 2007, and a director of GLOBE, the Global Legislators Organisation for a Balanced Environment.

In March 2010, he was appointed as the chair of an inquiry into the research conducted by the Climatic Research Unit following the Climatic Research Unit hacking incident. The report, released 14 April 2010, found that "...work has been carried out with integrity, and that allegations of deliberate misrepresentation and unjustified selection of data are not valid." Critics asserted Oxburgh's ties with businesses that stood to profit from the decision created a conflict of interest. The University of East Anglia did not see any conflict of interest, stating,

"The choice of scientists is sure to be the subject of discussion, and experience would suggest that it is impossible to find a group of eminent scientists to look at this issue who are acceptable to every interest group which has expressed a view in the last few months. Similarly it is unlikely that a group of people who have the necessary experience to assess the science, but have formed no view of their own on global warming, could be found."

== Personal life ==
While at Princeton University, Oxburgh was joined by his fiancée, Ursula, whom he married in the university chapel. They have three children. An outdoorsman, Oxburgh enjoyed orienteering and running marathons until knee surgery limited him to mountain hikes with his wife.

== Awards and honors ==
- He was appointed Knight Commander of the Order of the British Empire (KBE) in the 1992 Birthday Honours and made a Life Peer as Baron Oxburgh, of Liverpool in the County of Merseyside on 27 July 1999, where he sits as a crossbencher on the House of Lords Select Committee on Science and Technology and is an officer of the All-Parliamentary Group for Earth Sciences.
- He is an honorary fellow of St Edmund Hall and University College, Oxford.
- He received the 2007 Platts Life Time Achievement Award.
- He is a fellow of the Royal Society.
- He is a Corresponding fellow of the Australian Academy of Science.
- He is an Honorary Fellow of the Royal Academy of Engineering and a Foreign member of the US National Academy of Sciences as well as the Australian Academy of Science and the German Academy of Sciences Leopoldina.
- He is an Honorary Fellow of Liverpool John Moores University.
- Degree of Doctor of Science, honoris causa, from Leeds University conferred 21 July 2009
- Singapore Honorary Citizenship, from the President Tony Tan Keng Yam of Singapore, conferred 2 October 2012.
- He was awarded the Melchett Medal by the British Energy Institute on 2 December 2014

== Selected bibliography ==
- Oxburgh, E.R. (1968) The Geology of the eastern Alps, London: Geologists' Association, 127 p.
- Oxburgh, E R. (1974) The plain man's guide to plate tectonics, The eleventh Geologists' Association special lecture delivered 2 February 1973, Oxford: Geologists' Association., Reprinted from the Proceedings of the Geologists' Association, 85 (3)
- Moorbath, S., Thompson, R.N. and Oxburgh, E.R. (1984) "The relative contributions of mantle, oceanic crust and continental crust to magma genesis: Proceedings of a Royal Society discussion meeting held on 23 and 24 March 1983", Philosophical transactions of the Royal Society of London, 310 (1514), 342 p., London: Royal Society, ISBN 0-85403-230-4
- Oxburgh, E R., Yardley, B.W.D. and England, P.C. (Eds) (1987) Tectonic settings of regional metamorphism, Proceedings of a Royal Society discussion meeting in association with IGCP project no.235 on 'Metamorphism and Geodynamics' held on 29 and 30 January 1986, London: Royal Society, ISBN 0-85403-290-8
- Butler, R. Sir, Oxburgh, R. Sir and Field, F. (1996) Social business, Newchurch lecture series, London: Newchurch & Company, ISBN 0-9529139-0-9
- Oxburgh, E.R., Baron (Chairman) (2004) "Chips for everything: follow-up: report with evidence": 1st report of session 2003–04 / House of Lords, Science and Technology Committee, House of Lords papers 15, London: Stationery Office, ISBN 0-10-400372-3
- Oxburgh, E.R., Baron (Chairman) (2004) "Radioactive waste management: report with evidence: 5th report of session 2003–04 / House of Lords, Science and Technology Committee", House of Lords papers 200, London: Stationery Office, ISBN 0-10-400568-8
- Oxburgh, E.R., Baron (Chairman) (2004) "Renewable energy: practicalities; 4th report of session 2003–04 / House of Lords, Science and Technology Committee", House of Lords papers 126, London: Stationery Office, ISBN 0-10-400506-8
- Oxburgh, E.R., Baron (Chairman) (2004) "Science and the RDAs: follow-up: report with evidence: 2nd report of session 2003-04 / Select Committee on Science and Technology", House of Lords papers 103, London: Stationery Office, ISBN 0-10-400463-0
- Oxburgh, E.R., Baron (Chairman) (2004) "Science and treaties: 3rd report of session 2003-04 / Select Committee on Science and Technology", House of Lords papers, 110, London: Stationery Office, ISBN 0-10-400471-1

Academic offices
Preceded by Merger of Department of Geology with Departments of Mineralogy & Petrology and Geodesy & Geophysics	Head of Department of Earth Sciences, University of Cambridge; 1980 - 1988	Succeeded by Nick McCave
Preceded by W.A. Deer	Professor of Mineralogy and Petrology, University of Cambridge; 1978-1988	Succeeded by E.K.H Salje
Preceded by Derek Bowett	President of Queens' College, Cambridge; 1982–1989	Succeeded by John Polkinghorne
Preceded by Eric Ash	Rector of Imperial College London; 1993–2000	Succeeded by Richard Sykes
Business positions
Preceded by Philip Watts	Chairman of Shell Transport and Trading; 2004–2005	Succeeded by Position dissolved July 2005 responsibilities split between CEO Royal Dutch Shell: Jeroen van der Veer; and Chairman (Non-Exec) Royal Dutch Shell: Aad Jacobs
Orders of precedence in the United Kingdom		Succeeded by Position dissolved July 2005 responsibilities split between CEO Royal Dutch Shell: Jeroen van der Veer; and Chairman (Non-Exec) Royal Dutch Shell: Aad Jacobs
Preceded by The Lord Carlile of Berriew	Gentlemen; Baron Oxburgh	Followed by The Lord Harrison
