= David A. Hodell =

British–American geologist and paleoclimatologist

David A. Hodell FRS (born 1958) is a British–American geologist and paleoclimatologist.

== Biography ==
In October 2008, Hodell was appointed to the position of Woodwardian Professor of Geology at the University of Cambridge in the United Kingdom, where he is also a fellow of Clare College. He is a dual citizen of the United Kingdom and the United States. He is also the Director of the Godwin Laboratory for Palaeoclimate Research. Previously, he taught at the University of Florida from 1986–2008, earning the rank of full professor in geological sciences. Hodell was also the director of the Stable Isotope Laboratory from 1996–2008. Hodell earned his Ph.D. in 1986 in oceanography from the Graduate School of Oceanography, University of Rhode Island after earning his bachelor of arts in 1980 in geology from the University of Vermont.

He is a geochemist who studies Earth’s past climate. He has led many drilling expeditions of the International Ocean Discovery Program (IODP) and field excursions to collect marine and lake sediment cores and speleothems for palaeoclimate reconstructions. His research has demonstrated how past climate change affected ancient civilisations, such as the Maya and Indus Valley. Research by Hodell, Brenner, Curtis and Guilderson was instrumental in rethinking the Maya Collapse. Climate data derived from core samples retrieved from closed lake systems in the Mexico's Yucátan and Guatemala showed a period of extensive drought. In 1995, Hodell, Curtis and Brenner published a paleoclimate record from Lake Chichancanab on the Yucatán Peninsula that showed an intense, protracted drought occurred in the 9th century AD and coincided with the Classic Maya collapse. He has also made key contributions to understanding the Ice Age cycles of the Quaternary and their relationship to Earth’s orbit—for which he was awarded the Milutin Milanković Medal of the European Geophysical Union. More recent work has focused on the causes of rapid (millennial) climatic changes during the Quaternary using the extraordinary sedimentary archive preserved below the seafloor of the Iberian margin.

== Awards and honours ==
- 2007 Fellow, American Geophysical Union
- 2010 Emiliani Lecture, American Geophysical Union
- 2013 Fellow, Geological Society of London
- 2018 Milutin Milankovic Medal, European Geophysical Union
- 2020 Fellow, American Association for the Advancement of Science (AAAS)
- 2024 Fellow of the Royal Society

== Selected works ==
- Hodell, David A; Brenner, Mark; Curtis, Jason H.; Guilderson, Thomas (2001). "Solar forcing of drought frequency in the Maya lowlands" (PDF). Science. 292 (5520): 1367–70. Bibcode:2001Sci...292.1367H. doi:10.1126/science.1057759. PMID 11359010. Wikidata Q28189673. Archived from the original (PDF Reprint) on 2007-08-13.
- Zachos, James C; Röhl, Ursula; Schellenberg, Stephen A (2005). "Rapid acidification of the ocean during the Paleocene-Eocene thermal maximum". Science. 308 (5728): 1611–5. Bibcode:2005Sci...308.1611Z. doi:10.1126/science.1109004. PMID 15947184. Wikidata Q28255566.
- Elderfield, H; Ferretti, P; Greaves, M; Crowhurst, S; McCave, Nick; Hodell, D; Piotrowski, A M (2012). "Evolution of ocean temperature and ice volume through the mid-Pleistocene climate transition". Science. 337 (6095): 704–709. doi:10.1126/science.1221294. PMID 22879512. Wikidata Q47239511.

Academic offices
Preceded by Nick McCave	Woodwardian Professor of Geology, University of Cambridge; 2008 - present	Succeeded by Incumbent
