= W. Brian Harland =

British geologist (1917–2003)

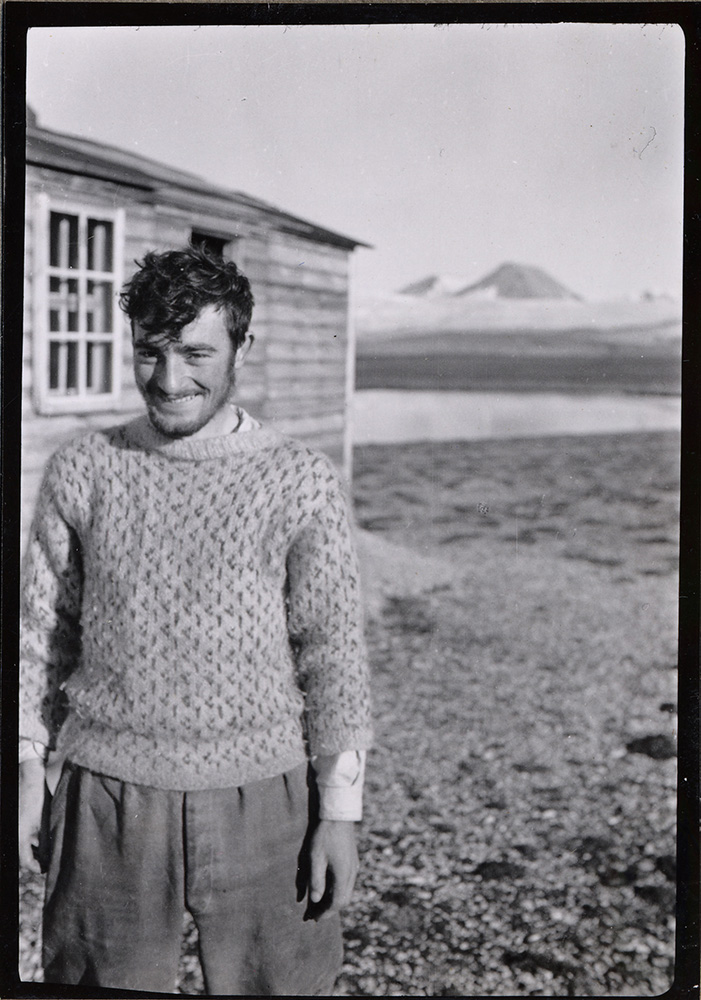
- Brian Harland, Svalbard 1938
- Born: Walter Brian Harland; 22 March 1917; Scarborough, England
- Died: 1 November 2003 (aged 86); Cambridge, England
- Education: Gonville and Caius College, Cambridge
- Spouse: Elisabeth Margaret Ethelwyn Harland
- Children: 4
- Awards: Founder's Medal of the Royal Geographical Society (1968); Lyell Medal (1976)
- Scientific career
- Fields: Geology
- Workplaces: University of Cambridge
- Doctoral students: David G. Gee

Walter Brian Harland (22 March 1917 – 1 November 2003) was a British geologist at the Department of Geology, later University of Cambridge Department of Earth Sciences, England, from 1948 to 2003. He was a leading figure in geological exploration and research in Svalbard, organising over 40 Cambridge Spitsbergen Expeditions (CSE) and in 1975 founded the Cambridge Arctic Shelf Programme (CASP) as a research institute to continue this work. He was first secretary of the International Geological Correlation Programme from 1969 until UNESCO could take over in 1972, and was a driving force in setting criteria and standards in stratigraphy and producing 4 editions of the geological time scale in 1964, 1971, 1982 and 1989. He also edited the international Geological Magazine for 30 years. In 1968, he was honoured with the Royal Geographical Society Gold Medal for Arctic exploration and research.

== Background ==
=== Early life and education ===
Walter Brian Harland was born 22 March 1917 in Scarborough, North Yorkshire, the son of Walter Ernest Harland (1880-1947), auctioneer and estate agent, and his wife, Alice Marian, née Whitfield (1883-1954). He grew up exploring many of the geological features of Yorkshire, and was taught mapping at primary school. As an 11 year old at the Downs School, Colwall, later The Downs Malvern he carried out a field study and geologically mapped the Malvern Hills. When he was thirteen and at Bootham School in York he discovered a near complete skeleton of Steneosaurus Brevior, an 11 foot long crocodile fossilized in the Jurassic rocks of the North Yorkshire coast, which was removed to the Natural History Museum, London. In 1935 he went to Gonville and Caius College, Cambridge, where he graduated with double first-class honours in natural sciences (geology) in 1938.

=== Personal life ===
Brian became a Quaker when he was an undergraduate, starting a lifelong interest in the relationship between religion, philosophy, and science. He married Elisabeth Lewis in 1942 and they had one son and three daughters. Brian Harland died in Cambridge 1 November 2003.

=== Academic career ===
After graduating, he started on a PhD at Cambridge to investigate the deep structure of eastern England, using explosion seismology; this ended with the outbreak of the Second World War. In 1946 he returned to the Department of Geology, later University of Cambridge Department of Earth Sciences, England, as Demonstrator till 1948. He was Lecturer from 1948-66, Reader in Tectonic Geology from 1966–84 and Emeritus Reader in Tectonic Geology from 1984 to 2003. He was a fellow of Gonville and Caius College, Cambridge from 1950–84 and Life Fellow from 1984-2003.

=== Conscientious objection/West China ===
Harland was a conscientious objector during the Second World War. After working on a farm near Scarborough, he spent 1942 to 1946 with the Friends Service Council in West China Union University, Chengdu, later Chengdu University of Technology, where he ran a Department of Geology. During this time, he spent two summers at the Bailie School in Shandan, Northwest China, advising the industrial co-operative there on natural resources. After the thaw in relations with China, following the Cultural Revolution, he renewed his relationship with what had become Chengdu University of Technology, and became a visiting professor.

=== Friendship with Joseph Needham ===
He maintained a lifelong friendship with Joseph Needham, from his time as a student at Gonville and Caius College, Cambridge when he invited the biochemist (already a college Fellow of 11 years standing) to address the College's Natural Science Club. They met again in China during 1942 to 1946 when they were both based in Sechwan, now known as Sichuan.

After the war they both returned to Cambridge where Needham became the leading scholar of the history of Chinese science. Harland became a founder trustee of the Needham Research Institute and "gave" Needham's eulogy at his memorial service.

== Work ==
=== Fieldwork ===
Field education was of utmost importance to Harland who saw it as a vital part of a university education in geological sciences. He was particularly associated with training first year students in the varied geology of the Isle of Arran. He pioneered the incorporation of fieldwork as a regular part of the Cambridge curriculum: and from 1952 for more than 30 years, led some 2000 students, on Arran fieldtrips. Here young scientists were trained to look at rocks in situ and make simple observations, and then to argue about what they saw ignoring all preconceptions. Before this time field trips had been run by the Sedgwick Club, an undergraduate society. On Cambridge Spitsbergen Expeditions well over 300 members of University of Cambridge Department of Earth Sciences had further training in field skills: making empirical observations and collecting specimens and data.

=== Arctic Geology and Cambridge Spitsbergen Expeditions ===
Harland was continuously involved with Arctic geological exploration and research. He first went to Spitsbergen in 1938 as part of a six-man geographical expedition. Spitsbergen is the largest and most mountainous island of the Norwegian high arctic archipelago known as Svalbard. He saw the geological potential of Svalbard for both research and educational work with its superb rock exposures showing a more or less complete stratigraphic succession from late Precambrian to the Palaeogene.

From 1948 he developed and directed the Cambridge Spitsbergen Expeditions (CSE) from the Cambridge University Department of Geology (later, the Department of Earth Sciences). The CSE became the Cambridge Svalbard Exploration research group and later developed into the Cambridge Arctic Shelf Programme, CASP. There were forty three summer seasons of expeditionary fieldwork, of which he led twenty nine. More than 300 undergraduates and about fifty graduate collaborators were involved over the years. Svalbard proved an excellent training ground for future geologists producing around thirty PhD theses and over three hundred scientific papers. Many senior figures in academia, industry and polar work gained early field experience on these expeditions.

Harland's work in the Arctic is commemorated by Harland Huset, the UK's Arctic Research Station located in Ny-Ålesund. The ice field ′Harlandisen′ in Spitsbergen is also named in his honour. His wife Elisabeth accompanied him on 13 expeditions and both were awarded the polar medal.

=== Survey field work and mapping ===
Cambridge Spitsbergen Expeditions carried out a programme of systematic geological and stratigraphic investigations. Early fieldwork involved transport in small open boats, man hauled sledges and much pack carrying to the study area, using primitive equipment and often in harsh conditions. Expeditions from 1949 to 1960 spent much effort on a simultaneous geological and topographical survey using map triangulation to fix the position of mountain tops.

He was awarded a Founder's Medal from the Royal Geographical Society in 1968 for his exploration and mapping work. A range of objects used by Harland in survey field work since the 1930s was donated to the Whipple Museum of the History of Science, Cambridge in 2003.

=== Svalbard Geology ===
From 1961 he extended the Svalbard project by negotiating financial support from oil companies: this enabled a programme of field investigations in wider areas, supported by better transport including a series of motor boats and occasional chartered helicopters. Local successions of rock units and fossils were described and correlations made in accord with the developing stratigraphic standards, providing the data for geotectonic interpretation and historical synthesis. Harland and colleagues’ research into Svalbard geology culminated in the comprehensive ′The Geology of Svalbard′ published in 1997.

=== Cambridge Arctic Shelf Programme (CASP) ===
In 1975 Harland formed the Cambridge Arctic Shelf Programme (CASP) as an extension of Cambridge Svalbard Exploration. The objective was field and literature based geological investigations into key aspects of the whole Arctic and surrounding areas, financed by subscriptions from the oil and gas industry. In 1988 CASP was incorporated as a non-profit research institute allied to the Department of Earth Sciences, Cambridge University. Its prime objective continued to be independent research, publication and education, while it increased its scope for geo-scientific research to China and Antarctica and other areas far beyond the Arctic. In the year of his death in 2003 CASP employed some twenty-five staff.

=== Information Management ===
Harland believed in the importance of preserving information and making it available. From his 1949 expedition onwards he operated a universal system for numbering localities, samples and photographs, and this provided the central basis for much collaborative work. Observations and materials collected were the property of the group and belonged to University of Cambridge.

A sophisticated information database, developed out of Harland's extensive library and filing systems, provided the cornerstone of literature based research for CSE and CASP. He developed Georecords, a system where pieces of information were regarded as standard units that could be preserved and handled in a standardised way. A series of paper forms were developed to support the standardisation of geological data extracted from the literature and geologists were employed to complete the forms. These data were then entered into a fully normalized database management system. Work using this system was extensively used, particularly in projects in China and Canada.

=== Continental Drift ===
Harland was keen on continental drift since reading Alfred Wegener as a schoolboy and advocated the theory in a talk to his school as a 15 year old. At Cambridge University he found an establishment that was hostile to the idea which was held to be inherently impossible. As a member of staff after the war, when the majority opinion was still opposed to it, he told students to keep an open mind: by 1964 models favouring continental drift became widely accepted.

Spitsbergen was a key element in some of the earliest speculations of continental drift: attempts to make sense of the field data led to hypotheses which could explain the relation between Spitsbergen and Greenland. At the 1964 Royal Society two day Symposium on Continental drift, Harland presented research on the tectonic evolution of the Arctic North Atlantic region. He looked at the history of the movements of these arctic terranes and at their ‘fit’ during the Caledonian orogeny. He described how substantial transcurrent, or strike slip, faulting provided the best explanation on their relative positions. At the end of 1964 he visited Beijing, Moscow and Leningrad where he again presented this research and argued for a theory of Continental drift. Over the following decades, Harland and colleagues used field data for developing models describing Svalbard's terranes and fault systems, which were important in understanding the tectonic evolution of the North Atlantic Region.

=== Palaeomagnetism ===
Harland was using palaeomagnetism before it became widely used and more sophisticated. With his student Derek Bidgood he made the first attempt, in 1958, to examine the palaeomagnetism of Precambrian glacial deposits, using rock samples collected in Greenland and Norway. The admittedly ′not very good′ palaeomagnetic results indicated that the Precambrian tillite formations had been deposited at low latitudes near the equator of the time. This contributed to his postulation that there had been a major Precambrian ice-age, with ice sheets or floating icebergs carrying the erratic blocks now embedded in the tillite, extending over most or all of the globe. There was the associated implication that the relevant landmasses had changed dramatically in latitude since the Precambrian indicated continental drift.

=== Global Late Precambrian Glaciations ===
Harland argued that there had been severe global glaciations in late Precambrian times and the evidence he presented was to form the foundations of Snowball Earth theory. His views were informed by extensive fieldwork on the glacial marine deposits in the Hecla Hoek strata in Svalbard.

He showed that evidence of late Precambrian global glaciations was remarkably widespread by gathering evidence from all the continents of the world except the Antarctic. He argued that glacial tillites had been deposited at tropical latitudes, appealing for support of his and Derek Bidgoods’ palaeomagnetic work. He described the evidence of glacial deposits interrupting strata suggestive of warm conditions. With this evidence he also claimed that a general theory of continental drift must now be accepted. He collaborated with palaeontologist Martin Rudwick, who described how an episode of almost glacial global conditions had been followed by an altered climate and environment which made possible the proliferation of animal life in Cambrian times.

When he presented his paper on evidence for a late Precambrian ice age, at the NATO conference in January 1963, it was not well received; attention was drawn by others to widespread evidence of aqueous deposition. It was not until the 1990s that the idea was more generally accepted, when Paul F. Hoffman and colleagues, argued that several such "Snowball Earth" episodes had occurred towards the end of Precambrian history.

=== Collision Zones ===
Harland investigated mountain belts and the relationship between stresses in the Earth and the building of the mountains. His field work and research in Svalbard looked closely at the Hecla Hoek rocks, a great geosyncline and part of the complex sedimentation belts of Europe, Greenland, and America. The main phase of the Caledonian orogeny in Svalbard deformed this geosyncline in intense fashion, followed by further phases of mountain building. He had ideas on deformation and flow of matter, and developed the concept of tectonic regimes to specify the symmetry and orientation of bulk deformation for use in tectonic analysis.

He coined the word ′transpression′ to convey the idea that many mountains have resulted from oblique convergence of the margins of the belt, rather than simple, vice-like compression perpendicular to the length of the belt. He also showed that continued transpression or compression could result in extrusion of the core of the belt, parallel to its length. "Transtension", with pull apart basins in zones of oblique extension, was a natural compliment.

=== Iapetus Ocean Named ===
In 1972 he named the Iapetus Ocean, when writing about the closure of this ocean area, to avoid confusion with the Proto-Atlantic Ocean. The ancient ocean Iapetus, existed before Devonian times, between 600 and 400 million years ago, and its closure caused the deformation of bordering geosynclines and the formation of the Arctic Caledonides. It had been known as the Proto-Atlantic Ocean, but that name implied the initial stages of the current Atlantic Ocean which began opening up some 200 million years later. The term is derived from Greek mythology where Iapetus is the brother of Okeanus and Tethys and father of Atlas from whose name the word Atlantis is derived.

=== Stratigraphy and Time Scales ===
Harland was a leading figure in compiling information on geological time scales and their ongoing development. He saw there was an urgent need to produce reliable time scales and provide organised high quality data for the scientific community. He produced four editions of the geologic time scale starting with the Geological Society of London 1964 time scale and its 1971 supplement. In the influential A Geologic Time Scale 1982, second edition 1989, the chronometric scale, based on units of duration, is calibrated with the chronostratic scale, based on a scale of rock sequences with standardised reference points, to form the geochronogic scale.

He was a key protagonist of the International Geological Correlation Programme (IGCP) and was its first secretary from 1969 to 1972, when a professional secretariat in UNESCO took over. He was committed to raising standards of scientific clarity and precision and on standardising the international chronostratic scale. Arising out of this he initiated two projects: the Precambrian Cambrian Boundary Project and the Pre-Pleistocene Tillite Project, which concluded with a volume of over 211 contributions. His prime stratigraphic interest was the working group on Terminal Precambrian systems with their tillites. He was Chairman of the Stratigraphy Committee of the Geological Society of London (GSSC) 1969-1973 and served on the International Sub-commission for Stratigraphy Classification (ISSC).

=== Earth science publications ===
Apart from being a prolific writer and collaborator himself, Harland promoted and facilitated the publication of geological research. For over 30 years from 1956 to 1988, he edited the Geological Magazine: the international journal published bi-monthly by the Cambridge University Press.

As Honorary Secretary of the Geological Society of London from 1963 to 1970 he led plans for the Society to become a centre for collaborative research. He initiated a series of multi-contribution books, which led to the Society's flagship series of Special Publications that had by his death in 2003, produced more than 200 volumes. From 1966 to 1981 he was Chairman of the Editorial Board of the Earth Science Series at Cambridge University Press, and continued on the Board until 1986.

=== Administration ===
Harland was thoroughly involved in administration throughout his career. He was secretary of the Department of Geology, later University of Cambridge Department of Earth Sciences, from 1946 to 1966, and undertook all aspects of administration for two Woodwardian Professors Woodwardian Professors, W.B.R.King and Oliver Bulman. From 1947 to 1964 he served on the Board of Faculty of Geography and Geology and also the Degree Committee and Appointments Committee at the University. He served on the Scott Polar Research Institute, Committee of Management from 1953 to 1957, when it was taken over by the University, and then continued to serve on its advisory committee. He was Librarian at the Department of Geology from 1968 to 1977 and also built up an extensive personal library. He regularly worked 14 hours a day or more.

== Awards ==
- Wollaston Fund, Geological Society. 1956.
- Founder's Medal from the Royal Geographical Society for Arctic exploration and research 1968.
- Lyell Medal, Geological Society of London. 1976.
- Polar medal – Arctic to 1977 for geological exploration of Spitsbergen. 1979.

== Collections and Archives ==
Some 60,000 specimens of rocks, fossils and core samples collected during the Cambridge Svalbard period are now in the care of the Sedgwick Museum of Earth Sciences. These include igneous and metamorphic rocks as well as structural, geochemical, geophysical and subsurface samples. Fossils were also collected during the expeditions along with the rock not only for taxonomy but for their environmental significance and tectonic importance.

The records of the Cambridge Svalbard Exploration Collection (ref. CSEC) are also at the Sedgwick Museum of Earth Sciences. The collection contains accounting records, administration files, expedition notes, and equipment records which all relate to work undertaken in Svalbard from 1949 until 1992. Much of this material includes far more information than has been previously published about the expeditions or the work undertaken.

Most of the expedition records are organized on the twinlock filing system – and include administrative papers, logs of each party, bulletins, accounts, as well as specimen, station, negative, and photograph catalogues, and copies of field notes. Individual field notebooks include diary entries, observations, details of specimens, and sketches. These were written and maintained by each individual and later amalgamated by Brian after each expedition (and its subsequent research) was completed.

The collection also includes glass plate photographs, miscellaneous tapes, photograph albums, offprints of articles, maps and plans, index cards & notes (specimen catalogues), curation reports (1990s), and some objects. There are also a series of records (reports) of the Norsk-Cambridge Svalbard Expeditions (NCSE) and Cambridge Archive Shelf Programme (CASP). A collection-level description is available on the Archives Hub

== See also ==
- Quakerism in Sichuan
