= Rachel Mills =

British geochemist and oceanographer

Rachel Ann Mills CBE
- Education: University of Cambridge; University of Southampton
- Scientific career
- Workplaces: University of Cambridge; University of Southampton; University of Sussex; King's College London

Rachel Ann Mills CBE is British geochemist and oceanographer. She is a Professor of Ocean Chemistry and Senior Vice President (Academic) at King's College London. She is a deep-sea oceanographer who works on the chemistry of the seafloor and its impact on life in the sea. She has led research expeditions using submersibles and remotely operated vehicles to remote and deep unexplored parts of the ocean.

In the 2024 Birthday Honours, Rachel Mills was appointed a Commander of the Order of the British Empire (CBE) for services to marine science.

== Early life and education ==
Mills studied oceanography at the University of Southampton, graduating in 1988. She completed her PhD on seafloor hydrothermal systems at the University of Cambridge.

== Research and career ==
Mills remained as a postdoctoral researcher at the University of Cambridge until her appointment as a lecturer in Chemical Oceanography at the University of Southampton in 1993. She later held the positions of Head of Ocean and Earth Science at the National Oceanography Centre, Southampton and Dean of the Faculty of Natural and Environmental Sciences (now Faculty of Environmental and Life Sciences) at the University of Southampton. In 2021 she took up the role of Provost at the University of Sussex, subsequently moving to King's College London as Senior Vice President (Academic).

Mills works with biologists and microbiologists to understand how microbial and macrobiotic communities interact with seafloor mineral deposits. She used hydrothermal sediment geochemistry to understand past changes to Pacific Ocean ventilation during the Pleistocene. To evaluate carbon sequestration in the Southern Ocean, Mills uses sedimentary proxies of carbon cycling in the water column.

She is past-President of the Challenger Society for Marine Science, the UK’s learned society for oceanographers and other marine experts, which incorporates the UK Scientific Committee on Oceanic Research. Mills is the lead educator for a massive open online course with FutureLearn "Exploring Our Ocean". She was a founding member of the Natural Environment Research Council Training Advisory Board. She is part of the international collaborative research project GEOTRACES.

In 2018, she appeared on BBC Radio 4's The Life Scientific.
