= 1986 New Year Honours =

British royal recognitions

The New Year Honours 1986 were appointments by most of the Commonwealth realms of Queen Elizabeth II to various orders and honours to reward and highlight good works by citizens of those countries, and honorary ones to citizens of other countries. They were announced on 30 December 1985 to celebrate the year passed and mark the beginning of 1986 in the United Kingdom, New Zealand, Mauritius, Fiji, the Bahamas, Grenada, Papua New Guinea, the Solomon Islands, Saint Lucia, Saint Vincent and the Grenadines, Belize, Antigua and Barbuda, and Saint Christopher and Nevis.

The recipients of honours are displayed here as they were styled before their new honour, and arranged by honour, with classes (Knight, Knight Grand Cross, etc.) and then divisions (Military, Civil, etc.) as appropriate.

== United Kingdom and Commonwealth ==
=== Life Peer ===
Baron

- Sir Frederick Dainton, Chancellor, Sheffield University.

=== Privy Counsellor ===
- Richard Napier Luce, MP. For political service.
- John Edward Michael Moore, MP. For political service.

=== Knight Bachelor ===
- Joseph Brian Barnard. For political service.
- Walter Fred Bodmer, Director of Research, Imperial Cancer Research Fund.
- Richard Bernard Frank Stewart Body, MP. For political service.
- The Right Honourable Adam Courtauld Butler, MP. For political service.
- Professor Frederick William Crawford, Vice-Chancellor, University of Aston.
- John Dent, CBE, Chairman, Civil Aviation Authority.
- Geoffrey Rudolph Elton, Regius Professor of Modern History, University of Cambridge.
- Andrew Patrick McEwen Forrest, Regius Professor of Clinical Surgery, University of Edinburgh.
- Ian James Fraser, CBE, MC, Lately Chairman, Lazard Brothers & Co. Ltd.
- Jack Arnold Hayward, OBE, For charitable services.
- The Right Honourable Bryant Godman Irvine. For political service.
- Professor Robert Kilpatrick, CBE, Chairman, Advisory Committee on Pesticides.
- Colonel Herbert Gerard Thomas McClellan, CBE, TD, DL, For political and public service.
- Roney Godfrey Collumbell Messervy, Chairman and Chief Executive, Lucas Industries plc.
- John Drummond Milne, Chairman and Group Managing Director, Blue Circle Industries plc.
- Stanley John Odell. For political and public service.
- Derek James Palmar, Chairman, Bass plc.
- David Arnold Stuart Plastow, Managing Director and Chief Executive, Vickers plc.
- James Gordon Reece. For political service.
- Brian Piers Shaw, Chairman and Chief Executive, Furness Withy & Co. Ltd.
- Trevor Herbert Harry Skeet, MP. For political service.
- David Cecil Smith, Sibthorpian Professor of Rural Economy, University of Oxford, and Biological Secretary, Royal Society.
- Francis Graham-Smith, Professor of Radio Astronomy and Director, Nuffield Radio Astronomy Laboratories, University of Manchester.
- Bryan Thwaites. For services to the National Health Service and to education.
- Geoffrey James Warnock, Principal, Hertford College, and former Vice-Chancellor, University of Oxford.
- His Honour Judge David Sturrock West-Russell, President of the Industrial Tribunals for England and Wales.

Diplomatic Service and Overseas List

- John Simon Rawson Golding, OBE, OJ, CD. For services to medicine in Jamaica.

Australian States
State of Queensland

- Terence Murray Lewis, OBE, GM, QPM, Commissioner, Queensland Police Force.

=== Order of the Bath ===
==== Knight Grand Cross of the Order of the Bath (GCB) ====
Civil Division

- Sir Kenneth Ronald Stowe, KCB, CVO, Permanent Secretary, Department of Health and Social Security.

==== Knight Commander of the Order of the Bath (KCB) ====
Military Division

Royal Navy

- Vice Admiral Robert William Frank Gerken, CBE.
- Vice Admiral Geoffrey Thomas James Oliver Dalton.

Army

- Lieutenant General Derek Boorman, CB, (411897), Colonel The Staffordshire Regiment (The Prince of Wales's), Colonel 6th Queen Elizabeth's Own Gurkha Rifles.
- Lieutenant General Michael Stuart Gray, OBE, (424340), late The Parachute Regiment, Honorary Colonel 10th (Volunteer) Battalion The Parachute Regiment.

Royal Air Force

- Air Marshal John Matthias Dobson Sutton, CB.

Civil Division

- Robert John Andrew, CB, Permanent Under Secretary of State, Northern Ireland Office.
- Kenneth Anthony Bradshaw, CB, Clerk of the House of Commons.
- David Howard Perry, Chief of Defence Equipment Collaboration, Ministry of Defence.

==== Companion of the Order of the Bath (CB) ====
Military Division

Royal Navy

- Rear Admiral Michael Anthony Vallis.
- Rear Admiral Linley Eric Middleton, DSO.
- Rear Admiral Euan Maclean.

Army

- Major General Robert Benbow (430224), Colonel Commandant Royal Corps of Signals.
- Major General Derek Henry Braggins (409408), late Royal Corps of Transport.
- Major General Bernard Charles Gordon Lennox, MBE, (426886), late Grenadier Guards.
- Major General Brendan Peter McGuinness (412325), late Royal Regiment of Artillery.
- Major General Laurence Anthony Wallis New, CBE, (424419), late Royal Tank Regiment (now RARO).
- Major General Guy Hansard Watkins, OBE, (430472), late Royal Regiment of Artillery.

Royal Air Force

- Air Vice-Marshal Michael Keith Adams, AFC.
- Air Vice-Marshal John Maurice Jones, QHDS.
- Air Vice-Marshal Keith Fred Sanderson.

Civil Division

- John Bryant Bourn, Deputy Secretary, Ministry of Defence.
- Hugh Francis Ellis-Rees, Regional Director, West Midlands Regional Office, Department of the Environment.
- Thomas Ralph Erskine, First Legislative Draftsman, Northern Ireland.
- Derek James Jeremy Gerhard, Deputy Master and Comptroller, Royal Mint.
- Peter Dalton Hall, Grade 3, Board of Inland Revenue.
- Philip Hugh Halsey, LVO, Deputy Secretary, Department of Education and Science.
- Andrew Harley, lately HM Chief Inspector of Mines and Quarries, Department of Employment.
- Bryce Harry Knox, Deputy Chairman, Board of Customs and Excise.
- Charles Mackay, Chief Agricultural Officer, Department of Agriculture and Fisheries for Scotland.
- John Palmer, Deputy Secretary, Department of Transport.
- Eric John Pryer, Chief Land Registrar.
- Christopher William Roberts, Deputy Secretary, Department of Trade and Industry.
- John Roberts, Under Secretary, Ministry of Defence.
- Adrian Murdoch Semmence, Medical Adviser to the Civil Service, Cabinet Office.
- Christopher John Train, Deputy Secretary, Home Office.
- John Stuart Scott Whyte, Under Secretary, Department of Health and Social Security.

=== Order of Saint Michael and Saint George ===
==== Knight Grand Cross of the Order of St Michael and St George (GCMG) ====
- Sir John Graham, Bt., KCMG, United Kingdom Permanent Representative on the North Atlantic Council, Brussels.

==== Knight Commander of the Order of St Michael and St George (KCMG) ====
- David Hugh Alexander Hannay, CMG, United Kingdom Permanent Representative to the European Communities, Brussels.
- Sir Joshua Hassan, CBE, LVO, QC, JP, Chief Minister, Gibraltar.
- Francis Kennedy, CBE, HM Consul-General and Director-General of Trade Development, New York.
- Patrick Hamilton Moberly, CMG, H.M. Ambassador, Pretoria.

==== Companion of the Order of St Michael and St George (CMG) ====
- Leonard Vincent Appleyard, Foreign and Commonwealth Office.
- Franklin Delow Berman, lately Counsellor (Legal Adviser), United Kingdom Mission to the UN, New York.
- Nigel Hugh Robert Broomfield, Minister, British High Commission, New Delhi.
- Anthony Charles Mayle De Vere, Counsellor, HM Embassy, Washington.
- Patrick Stanislaus Fairweather, HM Ambassador, Luanda.
- John Walton David Gray, HM Ambassador, Beirut.
- Christopher William Long, Foreign and Commonwealth Office.
- John Esmond Campbell Macrae, HM Ambassador, Dakar.
- John Thorold Masefield, Foreign and Commonwealth Office.
- Tessa Audrey Hilda Solesby, Foreign and Commonwealth Office.
- Peter John Streams, lately HM Consul-General, Karachi.

Australian States
State of Queensland

- The Honourable Claude Alfred Wharton, MLA. For public service.

=== Royal Victorian Order ===
==== Knight Grand Cross of the Royal Victorian Order (GCVO) ====
- The Most Noble Miles Francis Stapleton, Duke of Norfolk, KG, CB, CBE, MC.

==== Knight Commander of the Royal Victorian Order (KCVO) ====
- Colonel Piers Bengough, OBE.
- The Honourable Eustace Hubert Beilby Gibbs, CMG.
- Peter Tremayne Miles.

==== Commander of the Royal Victorian Order (CVO) ====
- Frederick Edward Robin Butler.
- John Pilkington Clayton, LVO.
- Geoffrey Ivor de Deney.
- Clifford Isaac Morgan, OBE.
- Air Commodore Denis Fenn Rixson, OBE, DFC, AFC, Royal Air Force.
- Nicholas Antony Sturridge.
- Conrad Marshall John Fisher Swan, LVO.

==== Lieutenant of the Royal Victorian Order (LVO) ====
- Lieutenant Colonel Frank Maurice Beale.
- Olive Gwendoline Beechey.
- Victoria Lindsay Legge-Bourke.
- David John Claxton, TD.
- Margaret McKay MacDonald, MVO, RVM.
- Kenneth William Parsons.
- Eric Smith, OBE.
- Adrian Geoffrey Leslie Turner.
- The Honourable Emily Mary Jane Walsh.

==== Member of the Royal Victorian Order (MVO) ====
- Flight Lieutenant Antony Robin Bennett, Royal Air Force.
- Lieutenant Commander Leonard James Robert Carter, Royal Navy.
- Jennifer Mary Damrel.
- Alan Geoffrey Hancock.
- Julia Cecily Harland.
- Glenys Olwen May Phillips.
- Sarah Ewart Todd.

==== Medal of the Royal Victorian Order (RVM) ====
In Gold

- Cyril Sidney Dickman, RVM.

In Silver

- Frank Cutts.
- Police Sergeant Kenneth Cecil Dumain, Metropolitan Police.
- W4260644 Flight Sergeant John Grant, Royal Air Force.
- Q0687464 Flight Sergeant Terence William Harper Royal Air Force.
- James Dennis Juffs.
- Police Constable Edward Derek Lane, Metropolitan Police.
- William George Meldrum.
- David Andrew Senior.
- Police Constable Derek Keith Shelley, Metropolitan Police.
- Local Acting Chief Marine Engineering Mechanic (Electrical) Stephen Herbert Smith, (D097361P).
- Stephen John West.

Bar to the RVM in Silver

- Herbert Edward Long, RVM.

=== Order of the British Empire ===
==== Dame Commander of the Order of the British Empire (DBE) ====
Civil Division

- Rosemary Christian Howard. For services to the Church of England and the British Council of Churches.
- Gwyneth Jones, CBE, (Mrs. Haberfeld-Jones), Singer.
- Barbara Estelle Shenfield, Chairman, Women's Royal Voluntary Service.

==== Commander of the Order of the British Empire (CBE) ====
Military Division

Royal Navy

- Commodore Terence David Arthur Thompson, ADC.
- Commodore John Watt Wightman, RD*, Royal Naval Reserve.
- Commandant Daphne Patricia Swallow, ADC, Women's Royal Naval Service.
- Captain Cyril Gordon Butterworth, Royal Fleet Auxiliary Service.

Army

- Colonel David Francis Edmund Botting (451167), late Royal Army Ordnance Corps.
- Colonel George Michael Fleetwood (424316), late Royal Regiment of Artillery.
- Brigadier Bernard Victor Hilary Fullerton (397890), late Royal Army Pay Corps.
- Brigadier Clinton Lionel Guy Grant Henshaw (448979), late The Royal Green Jackets.
- Brigadier Peter Ian Boldero Stevenson (440170), late The Kings Own Scottish Borderers.
- Brigadier Brian Thomas, OBE, (413892), Corps of Royal Military Police.
- Brigadier John Barford Wilks, ADC, (420959), late Corps of Royal Engineers.
- Brigadier Thomas Gwyn Williams, OBE, (424512), late 14th/20th King's Hussars.

Royal Air Force

- Air Commodore Desmond Marcel Richard.
- Group Captain John Shakespeare Allison, MBE.
- Group Captain Timothy Charles Elworthy.
- Group Captain John Stephen Fosh.
- Group Captain Michael John Milligan.

Civil Division

- Donald Angel, Chairman, Birds Eye Walls Ltd.
- John Campbell, Viscount of Arbuthnott, DSC. For services to the environment, particularly in Scotland.
- John Anthony Ball. For political and public service.
- Ronald Alistair Bennett, QC, Chairman, Local Government Boundary Commission for Scotland.
- Christine Betty Bicknell. For services to the National Health Service in Central London.
- Margaret Joyce Billings. For political service.
- Geoffrey Michael Lindesay Blackburne-Kane, lately Senior Technical Adviser, Ministry of Defence.
- John Bower, Director of Education, Humberside.
- John Lewis Bowron, Secretary-General, Law Society.
- Christopher Dermont Boylan, Director "B", Department of the Environment.
- John Howard Hullah Bradbury, lately President, Cake and Biscuit Alliance; Buying Director, United Biscuits (UK) plc.
- John Richard Grenfell Bradfield, Senior Bursar, Trinity College, Cambridge. For services to the Cambridge Science Park.
- Philip Stanley Bulson, lately Deputy Chief Scientific Officer, Ministry of Defence.
- George Dawson Burnett, TD, Deputy Chairman, Central Trustee Savings Bank Ltd.
- Colonel Graham Stephen Paul Garden, TD, DL, Vice-Chairman, Council of Territorial Auxiliary and Voluntary Reserve Association.
- Eric Stephen Carter, Adviser, National Farming and Wildlife Advisory Group.
- Charles Stanley Causley, Poet.
- Hugh Neville Conder, Partner, Casson Conder Partnership.
- Philip Henry Connell, Consultant Psychiatrist & Director, Drug Dependence Unit, Bethlem Royal Hospital & Maudsley Hospital, London.
- Peter Gordon Davey, Managing Director, Meta Machines Ltd.
- Brian Gurney David, Deputy Receiver, Metropolitan Police.
- Elizabeth David, OBE. For services to the art of cooking.
- The Honourable Islwyn Edmund Evan Davies, DL. For services to agriculture in Wales.
- Edward Thomas Downes. Conductor.
- John Elliott Orr Dunwoody, Chairman, Bloomsbury District Health Authority.
- Professor Jack Edwards. For services to Nuclear Safety.
- John Michael McFadyean Edwards, QC, Provost, City of London Polytechnic.
- Walter Elliot, OBE, Farmer, lately Chairman, British Wool Marketing Board.
- John Hubert Emlyn Jones, MBE, Member, Lands Tribunal.
- Peter Evans, lately Chairman, Printing Machinery Economic Development Committee.
- Lieutenant Commander John Timothy Fetherston-Dilke, Royal Navy (Retd.), Chief Coastguard, HM Coastguard.
- Bernard Ernest Friend, Director of Finance, British Aerospace plc.
- James Jesse Gardner, DL, Chief Executive, Tyne and Wear Metropolitan County Council.
- Malcolm Paul Weston Godfrey. For services to Medicine.
- William Gonzalez, Chief Statistician, Board of Inland Revenue.
- William Ian Macdonald Goskirk, lately Chief Executive, British National Oil Corporation.
- Professor Brian Glover Gowenlock. For services to the University Grants Committee.
- George Ronald Gibson Graham, lately President, Law Society of Scotland.
- David Alfred Gray, lately Programmes Director, British Geological Survey, N.E.R.C.
- Graham Carleton Greene, Joint Chairman, Chatto, Virago, Bodley Head and Jonathan Cape Ltd.
- Henry Louis Carron Greig, CVO, Chairman, H. Clarkson (Holdings) plc.
- James Edward Alexander Rundell Guinness, Chairman, Public Works Loan Commissioners.
- John Michael Gwynn, Chief Land Agent, Forestry Commission.
- Robin (Robert) John Herd, Managing Director, March Cars Ltd.
- Denis William Higman, Regional Director, North Region, Prison Service, Home Office.
- George Humphreys, OBE, Chairman, Northern Health and Social Services Board, Northern Ireland.
- Harold Victor Keating, Chairman, West Midlands Region, British Gas Corporation.
- Charles Henry Kelly, QPM, DL, Chief Constable, Staffordshire Police.
- Martin Killoran, QFSM, lately Chief Officer, Greater Manchester Fire Service.
- John Lamb, James Watt Professor of Electrical Engineering, University of Glasgow.
- Stuart Nicol Burdett Leishman. For political and public service.
- James Anthony Lemkin. For political and public service.
- Harold Owen Luder, Chairman and Managing Director, Owen Luder Partnership.
- Ian Grant MacBean, Managing Director, Marconi Company Ltd. For services to Export.
- Duncan Malcolm MacIver, Assistant Controller of Prisons, Scottish Home and Health Department.
- Geoffrey Manning, Director, Rutherford Appleton Laboratory, Science and Engineering Research Council.
- Arthur Eric Martin, OBE, Chairman, Construction Industry Training Board, Northern Ireland.
- Derek Stevens Mason, Chairman, Scottish Special Housing Association.
- Alexander Duncan McCowen, OBE, Actor.
- John Strachan McCracken, Director, Communications and External Programmes, IBM (UK) Ltd. For services to Export.
- Beatrix Molineux Miller, Editor-in-Chief, Vogue.
- James Miller, Chairman and Managing Director, James Miller & Partners Ltd.
- Lewis David Moss, DL, Leader and Chairman of Policy Committee, Association of County Councils.
- Donald Victor Newbold, Chairman, Foster Wheeler Ltd. For services to Export.
- Frederick Edward Fry Newman, MC, Chairman and Managing Director, Dan-Air Services Ltd.
- William Nicol, MBE, lately Chairman, Scottish Technical Education Council.
- Julia Trevelyan Oman (Lady Strong), Designer, Director, Oman Productions Ltd.
- Richard John Parkhouse, Managing Director, Stevenage Division, Dynamics Group, British Aerospace plc. For services to Export.
- Thomas Donald Parr, Chairman, William Baird plc.
- John Hill Pascoe, lately Chairman, Chamber of Coal Traders.
- Robert Galloway Emslie Peggie, Chief Executive, Lothian Regional Council.
- Sidney Procter, Director and lately Group Chief Executive, Royal Bank of Scotland Group plc.
- David Alan Pyke, Physician-in-Charge, Diabetic Department, King's College Hospital, London.
- Peter Henry Reay, Group Personnel Director, Cadbury Schweppes plc.
- Arthur Neil Francis Rees, Chief Executive, Swansea City Council.
- Tony Melville Ridley, Chairman and Managing Director, London Underground.
- Cecil Roberts, Chairman, Powys Area Health Authority.
- Thomas Snowdon Robson, OBE, Director of Engineering, Independent Broadcasting Authority.
- Philip John Sadler, Principal, Ashridge Management College.
- Gordon Hartley Sambrook, Board Member, British Steel Corporation.
- Arnold Lewis Sayers, Leader, Devon County Council.
- Peter Howell Schurr. For medical services to the Army.
- Professor James Alexander Scott, Regional Medical Officer, Trent Regional Health Authority.
- Robert Shackleton, Marshal Foch Professor of French Literature, University of Oxford.
- Stephen Malcolm Stewart, QC, Chairman, Common Law Institute of Intellectual Property.
- Dorothy Monica Mary Sudgen, Principal, National Institute of Social Work.
- Jean Helen Thompson, Chief Statistician, Department of Health and Social Security.
- Herbert Richard Charles Walden, lately Chairman, Building Societies Association; Director and General Manager, Heart of England Building Society.
- Esme Walker, Vice-Chairman, National Consumer Council.
- Alexander Wilson, Director General, The British Library Reference Division.
- Norman Samuel Wooding, Deputy Chairman, Courtaulds plc. For services to Export.
- Henry Wrong, General Administrator, Barbican Centre for Arts and Conferences.

Diplomatic Service and Overseas List

- Selwyn Eugene Alleyne, JP, Secretary, Government Secretariat, Hong Kong.
- (John) Michael Brown, lately HM Consul-General, Geneva.
- John Francis Defrates, lately Director, UNRWA Affairs, Beirut.
- John Melman Harrison, OBE. For services to British commercial interests in Australia.
- Dr. Daniel Lam See-hin, OBE. For public services in Hong Kong.
- Arthur Michael McMullin, Justice of Appeal, Hong Kong.

Australian States
State of Queensland

- Emeritus Professor John Howard Tyrer. For services to medicine.

State of Tasmania

- Wilfrid George Barker. For services to the community.

==== Officer of the Order of the British Empire (OBE) ====
Military Division

Royal Navy

- Commander (C.C.F.) Keith Alexander Berridge, Royal Naval Reserve.
- Commander Francis Peter Duppa-Meller.
- Lieutenant Colonel Michael Hugh Hearn Evans, Royal Marines.
- Commander Peter James Alexander Ford.
- Commander Roger Noel Guy, MBE.
- Surgeon Commander Frederick Michael John Hiles.
- Commander (C.C.F.) John Raymond Lamb, Royal Naval Reserve.
- Commander Martin Douglas Macpherson.
- Commander Michael Maddox.
- Commander William Alfred Twist.
- Commander Victor David Watson.

Army

- Lieutenant Colonel George Herbert Baird, TD, (468214), The Royal Irish Rangers (27th (Inniskilling) 83rd and 87th) Territorial Army.
- Acting Colonel John Brown, MM, TD, (448099), Army Cadet Force, Territorial Army.
- Lieutenant Colonel Edmund Fortescue Gerard Burton (475110), Royal Regiment of Artillery.
- Lieutenant Colonel (now Colonel) Henry Michael Edward Cadogan (439961), The Royal Welch Fusiliers.
- Lieutenant Colonel George Osborne Cowan (460772), Royal Army Medical Corps.
- Lieutenant Colonel Terence Bruce Dutton, MBE, (465752), The Gloucestershire Regiment.
- Acting Lieutenant Colonel Roger Elliott (314963), Combined Cadet Force, Territorial Army.
- Lieutenant Colonel Peter Alec French (461427), Royal Corps of Transport.
- Lieutenant Colonel Myles Richard Frisby (480918), Coldstream Guards.
- Lieutenant Colonel (now Acting Colonel) Adrian Alan Hedley (467570), 16th/5th The Queen's Royal Lancers.
- Lieutenant Colonel Simon Derek Graham McKinley (480360), The Royal Green Jackets.
- Lieutenant Colonel Rodney John Milsom (463482), Corps of Royal Engineers.
- Lieutenant Colonel Brian George Graham Nicholson (474020), Royal Regiment of Artillery.
- Lieutenant Colonel (now Colonel) Richard Arthur Oliver (479312), Corps of Royal Engineers.
- Lieutenant Colonel Robert Haston Paterson (467608), The Royal Scots (The Royal Regiment).
- Lieutenant Colonel Robert Ian Reive (472610), Corps of Royal Engineers.
- Lieutenant Colonel John Martin Steele, MBE, TD, (459482), Royal Regiment of Artillery, Territorial Army.
- Lieutenant Colonel Michael John Woodcock (449083), Royal Regiment of Artillery.

Overseas Awards

- Lieutenant Colonel Ernest Michael Britto, ED, lately Commanding Officer The Gibraltar Regiment.
- Lieutenant Colonel Clinton Eugene Raynor, lately Commanding Officer The Bermuda Regiment.

Royal Air Force

- Wing Commander Robin Baker (508323).
- Wing Commander John Millard Brown (2781207).
- Wing Commander Anthony John Harrison (4231702).
- Wing Commander (now Group Captain) Raymond Edward Earl Hart (4335319).
- Wing Commander Dennis Sydney George Jackson (3113250), Royal Air Force Volunteer Reserve (Training).
- Wing Commander Helen Beith-Jones (2797127), Women's Royal Air Force.
- Wing Commander David Thomas McCann (2533339).
- Wing Commander Barry Edward Nunn (2618111).
- Wing Commander (now Group Captain) Terence Charles Potesta (4203046).
- Wing Commander Joseph Robert Denis Sauzier, MBE, (609344).
- Wing Commander Peter Thomas West (4335065).

Civil Division

- Thomas Morton Aitchison. Director, Information Services for the Physics and Engineering Community, Institution of Electrical Engineers.
- Peter John Aldington, Senior Partner, Aldington Craig & Collinge.
- Charles Allen, lately Assistant General Manager, Ferranti plc, Scotland. For services to Export.
- Cyril Ashley, DL, Chairman, L'Oréal Ltd.
- Avinash Chandra Bajpai, Director, Centre for the Advancement of Mathematics in Technology, University of Loughborough.
- Keith Percy Ball, Senior Lecturer in Community Medicine, Middlesex Hospital Medical School.
- Quintin James Ballardie, Founder and Artistic Director, English Chamber Orchestra.
- Lieutenant Colonel Michael Charles Barraclough, Secretary, Faculty of Homeopathy and Homoeopathic Trust.
- Alan Gordon Beavan. For political and public service.
- Joan Mabel Betts, lately Chief Chemist and Microbiologist, Cliffords Dairy Products.
- David Biggins, Managing Director, Sovereign Oil & Gas plc.
- Sheila Psyche Black, Chairman, National Gas Consumers' Council.
- Stanley Black, Conductor and Composer.
- Peter Moore Brand. For public services in Northern Ireland.
- Kathleen Claire Brooks. For political and public service.
- Andrew Alistair Brown, General Medical Practitioner, Edinburgh.
- Iona Brown, Violinist. Director, Academy of St. Martins.
- Robert James Brown, lately Bursar, Queen's University of Belfast.
- William Wilson McBride Brown, Chairman and Chief Executive, Robertson Research International plc.
- Noel Henry Burdett, lately National Chairman, The Abbeyfield Society.
- Kenneth Ninian Burns, Scientific Adviser (Veterinary), Agricultural and Food Research Council.
- Charles Barrie Byford. For political and public service.
- Ronald John Carrington, Member, Hereford and Worcester County Council.
- Maurice Basil Chammings, Superintending Civil Engineer, Department of the Environment.
- Stanley Edward Churchfield, Director, Exploration, and Production, Burmah Oil plc.
- June Lilian Churchman, lately Chief Commissioner of Guides, Wales.
- Michael Connolly, Director, Parcels, British Railways Board.
- Michael John Blencowe Cookson, TD, DL, Chairman, Northumberland Association of Boys' Clubs.
- Donald Cecil Cope, General Manager, Clwyd Health Authority.
- Adrian Cowan, Senior Principal, Department of the Environment.
- Harry Cowie. For political service.
- Michael Cronin, Chairman, Crowther Legislation Committee, Finance Houses Association.
- Gerald Offley Crowther, Manager, Applications Laboratory, Milliards Ltd.
- Margaret Mary Cullen, Vice-Chairman, Southern Education and Library Board, Northern Ireland.
- Noel Norman Dearing, Manager, Small Business Section, Domestic Banking Division, National Westminster Bank plc.
- Thomas Bradford Degenhardt, Secretary, Institute of Cost and Management Accountants.
- Edward Allan Kitson Denison TD. For political and public service.
- Robert James Dickson. For services to education in Northern Ireland.
- Peter Dixon, Head, Rowlinson School, Sheffield.
- Cyril Francis Drake, Chief Research Fellow, Standard Telecommunication Laboratories Ltd., STC plc.
- David Bryan Duff, Senior Principal, Board of Inland Revenue.
- Eric Charles Dyer, Director, East Midlands Airport.
- Paul Lewis Dyer, Grade 6, HM Treasury.
- Edith Lucy Eaton, Secretary, Londonderry City Division, Soldiers', Sailors' and Airmen's Families Association.
- Geoffrey Eccles, Deputy Chairman, Eastern Region, British Gas Corporation.
- William Eccles, Chairman and Chief Executive, James Fisher & Sons plc.
- Derek Morris Embrey, Group Technical Director, AB Electronic Products Group plc.
- David Ensor, lately Managing Director, Croydon Advertiser Ltd.
- Edwin Russell Eunson, Convenor, Orkney Islands Council.
- Alun Evans, For services to agriculture in Wales.
- Margaret Blacklock Evans, lately Headteacher, Seven Kings High School, Redbridge.
- George Henry Fairweather. For services to the Royal British Legion in Lancashire.
- Eve Rosamund Falkner. For political and public service.
- Edward William Field, Accountant, House of Lords.
- George Irvine Finlay. For political service.
- Gordon Fisher, Chairman, FEB International plc.
- Gordon Russell Gardner, lately Secretary/Director of Administration, Construction Industry Training Board.
- David Gemmell, Managing Director, Possum Controls Ltd.
- Arthur Gilbert, First Class Valuer, Board of Inland Revenue.
- Patrick James Given, Staff Development Officer, South of Scotland Electricity Board.
- Laurence Galsworthy Green, Deputy Chairman of the Board, Moorfields Eye Hospital.
- William George Kendall Griffiths. For political and public service.
- Ronald Henry Gunston, Chief Fire Service Officer, Ministry of Defence.
- Lawrence George Hadley, Senior Partner, Donald Smith, Seymour & Rooley.
- John Neville Hampton, lately Head of Air Photography Section, Royal Commission on the Historical Monuments of England.
- Alastair Kydd Hanton, Deputy Managing Director, National Girobank.
- Michael Fraye Hardy, County Surveyor, Hertfordshire County Council.
- Dorothy Clare Harkin, lately Principal, Lord Chancellor's Department.
- John Leigh Harkness, Rose Breeder and Grower.
- John Frederick Harris, Curator, Drawings Collection, Royal Institute of British Architects.
- William George Hastings, Chairman, Hastings Hotels Group Ltd.
- Edward Haughey, Managing Director, Norbrook Laboratories Ltd.
- Hedley Walter Haward. For public services in Dorset.
- John Steven Henderson. For public services in London.
- Brian Dennis Hermon, Principal, Board of Customs and Excise.
- David Ian Heslop, Member, Sheffield Metropolitan City Council.
- Pamela Jean Hibbs, District Nursing Officer, City and Hackney Health Authority.
- Raymond John Hilborne, Executive Director, Geest Industries Ltd.
- Rowland Hilder, Artist.
- Desmond William Hill Hodges, Director, Edinburgh New Town Conservation Committee.
- Edwin George Hooper, Chief Safety Officer, Electricity Council.
- Isaac Rees Hopkin, lately Headteacher, Gwrt Sart Comprehensive School, Briton Ferry, West Glamorgan.
- Daphne Howard, Headteacher, Brine Leas School, Nantwich, Cheshire.
- Alan Thomas Howarth, Clinical Biochemist, Bradford Royal Infirmary.
- Edith Margaret Howie. For political and public service.
- Ronald William Howlett, Managing Director, Cwmbran Development Corporation.
- Philip Hughes, DSC, lately Director of Social Services, City of Wakefield Metropolitan District Council.
- Alan Clifford Hutchinson, Principal, Paddington College.
- Edward John Huxtable. For services to the magistracy in North East London.
- John Patrick Ide, Secretary, Theatre Investment Trust.
- David Maurice Jacobs, Consultant on Company Law.
- John Ellis Erasmus Jenkins, Senior Principal Scientific Officer, Ministry of Agriculture, Fisheries and Food.
- Jean Johnston. For political and public service.
- David Aubrey Jones, Clerk to the Justices, Cambridge City, Ely, Newmarket and South Cambridgeshire.
- Frederick Herbert Keens, Grade 6, Home Office.
- Professor George Stewart Kilpatrick. For services to medicine in Wales.
- Ralph Richard Land, General Manager, Eastern Europe Export Operations, Rank Xerox Ltd. For services to Export.
- Rowena Mary Lawson. For services to fisheries economics and development overseas.
- Lieutenant Colonel David Alexander Wallace Lochhead, MC, lately General Secretary, Scottish Branch, British Red Cross Society.
- Hew Martin Lorimer. For services to the Scottish heritage.
- Kathleen Mary Losinska. For services to the Civil and Public Services Association.
- Ann Pauline Lynch, Director of Nurse Education, Leeds (Eastern) District School of Nursing.
- Colonel Hugh Mackay, Director, Overseas Department, Save the Children Fund.
- Colonel William Bradbury Mansell, MC, lately Principal, National Maritime Museum.
- Elisabeth Lesley Grant Mapstone, Professor of Social Administration and Social Work, University of Dundee.
- Alan Charles Nelson Martin, General Director, Scripture Union in England and Wales.
- Hugh Leslie Mathews, Director of Production, Midlands Region, Central Electricity Generating Board.
- Colonel Alexander Matthew, DL, Vice-Chairman, North West of England and Isle of Man Territorial Auxiliary and Volunteer Reserve Association.
- John Charles McCaskie, Director, Baker Perkins Holdings plc.
- John McCorkindale, Member, Strathclyde Regional Council.
- William Gordon McDougall, Principal, Department of Health and Social Security.
- William McGookin, Chief Information Officer, Royal Ulster Constabulary.
- Francis McGrath, Assistant Director (Engineer), Ministry of Defence.
- Mervyn Kenneth McKenzie. For political and public service.
- Derek Michael Melluish, lately Head of Computing Services, North Staffordshire Polytechnic.
- Mary Johanna Metcalf, Headteacher, Haggerston School, Hackney.
- Alexander Money, lately Principal, Motherwell College, Lanarkshire.
- George Henry Moore, QFSM, Chief Officer, Lincolnshire Fire Brigade.
- Leslie James Morrell, Chairman, Northern Ireland Water Council.
- Ferris Anderson Morton, Superintending Professional and Technology Officer, Ministry of Defence.
- Arthur Muscott, lately Principal Scientific Officer, Ministry of Defence.
- Desmond William Neill, Biochemist and Head of the Department of Biochemistry, Royal Victoria Hospital, Belfast.
- Margot Gwendoline Neill, Chairman, CRUSE, Northern Ireland.
- Ronald Norman, Chairman, R. Norman Ltd.
- Jack Gordon Overy. For services to Cricket.
- Henry Paton, Senior Engineer Superintendent, Ben Line Steamers Ltd.
- Frank Arthur Walter Peregrine, lately Principal, Lancashire College of Agriculture.
- Pamela Hazel Phillips. For political and public service.
- Malcolm Roy Pike, Head, Nacelle International Aero Engines AG. For services to Export.
- Peter Claude Pinfield, VRD. For political service.
- Bryan Nicholas Preston, Executive Director, Stone Manganese Marine Ltd. For services to Export.
- Charles Reginald Purley, Chairman, Lee Refrigeration plc.
- Donald Joseph Ramsden, Secretary, East Midlands Regional Examination Board.
- Guy Readman, Chairman and Managing Director, Tor Coatings Ltd.
- Michael Myer Reed, lately Chairman, Royal National Institute for the Deaf.
- Robert Hargreaves Reed, Managing Director, William Reed (Weaving) Ltd.
- Helen May Reeves, Director, National Association of Victims' Support Schemes.
- Beryl Reid, Actress.
- Michael David Richards, Deputy Assistant Commissioner, Metropolitan Police.
- John Henry Richardson, Governor I, HM Prison Liverpool.
- Mary Richardson, Director of Personnel and Nurse Adviser, Hammersmith Special Health Authority.
- Elizabeth Scylla Riley Lord, DL. For services to the community in Darlington, County Durham.
- Eric Thomas Ringrose, Technical Director, Microflow, Dent & Hellyer Ltd.
- Harold Alfred Thomas Rogers, lately Manager, Radio Kent, British Broadcasting Corporation.
- David Andrew Ross Stewart, Chairman and Managing Director, John Bartholomew & Son Ltd.
- James Fraser Royan, Commissioner, Meat and Livestock Commission.
- Brian McCallan Rutherford, lately Chief Buyer, BOCM Silcock Ltd.
- Kenneth Clive Saltrick, Operations Director, Flight Refuelling Ltd.
- Thomas Albert Sandrock, lately Crime Correspondent, The Daily Telegraph.
- Merton Seigleman. For services to the East Lancashire Hospice.
- David Nicholas Oliver Sekers, Director, Quarry Bank Museum.
- John Antony David Settle, Director, Yorkshire Regional Burns Centre, Pinderfields General Hospital, Wakefield.
- Richard Adrian William Sharp. For services to Sport particularly in the South West.
- David Thomas Sharpe, Consultant Plastic Surgeon, Bradford Health Authority.
- Nora Smith. For political service.
- Victor Henry Smith, Transport Systems Consultant.
- William Christopher Smith, Member, Hammersmith and Fulham Borough Council.
- Beverley John Snook, Chairman, Royal Aero Club of the United Kingdom.
- Alexander Allison Steele, lately Sheriff Clerk, Dundee Sheriff Court, Scottish Courts Administration.
- Charles Miller Stevenson, Managing Director, Todd & Duncan Ltd.
- Clara Winifred Stone, Director, The Children's Society.
- Paul Anthony Sturgess, lately Executive Secretary, Marie Curie Memorial Foundation.
- John Guthrie Sutherland, Chief Area Nursing Officer, Forth Valley Health Board.
- Richard Carey Swan, Director, Agriculture Training Board.
- Philip Edgar Swinstead, Chairman and Managing Director, Systems Designers International plc.
- Thomas Francis Thomas, For services to the community in Mid-Wales.
- John De Morgan Campbell Thompson, Director, Hot Isostatic Press Company Ltd.
- Margaret Wallace Thomson, Chief Executive Officer, National Board for Nursing, Midwifery and Health Visiting for Scotland.
- Harold Touzeau, Commander, Guernsey Division, St. John Ambulance Brigade.
- Isabel Margaret Traill. For services to the Arts in Scotland.
- Reginald William James Tridgell, Chief Executive, London Borough of Havering.
- Albert William Tuke, Director, North Yorkshire Area, National Coal Board.
- Kenneth Ian Tunnicliffe. For political service.
- Noel Laird Valentine, Branch Manager, Belfast, Cheltenham & Gloucester Building Society.
- Roger Davison Vaughan, General Manager, Fast Reactor Projects, National Nuclear Corporation Ltd.
- Colin Vickerman, Secretary, Joint Matriculation Board.
- Mirosław Vitali, Medical Adviser, National Association for Limbless Disabled.
- Geoffrey Hugh Walsh, Technical Adviser, Ministry of Defence.
- Constance Ward, National Meals on Wheels Organiser, Women's Royal Voluntary Service.
- William Roy Warrington, Deputy Secretary, Association of District Councils.
- Walter Ernest Hector Westlake, Deputy Controller, National Savings Bank, Department for National Savings.
- William Henry Potts Whatley, General Secretary, Union of Shop, Distributive and Allied Workers.
- Daniel Geraint Williams, lately Headmaster, Castell Alun Comprehensive School, Clwyd.
- John Hobart Frederick Parker Williams, Administrator, Nottinghamshire Family Practitioner Committee.
- Alan Arthur Wilson, Chief Regional Scientific Adviser, No. 4 Civil Defence Region.
- David Geoffrey Wilson, DL. For public services in the North West.
- Monica Mary Woodhouse, Proprietor, Hampshire Chronicle.
- Samuel Arthur John Young. For political and public service.

Diplomatic Service and Overseas List

- Professor Anne Christine Bayley. For services to medical education in Zambia.
- Jack Briggs, MBE. For services to British interests in Dubai, United Arab Emirates.
- Keith Francis Burd, British Council Representative, Uganda.
- Chan Pak-keung MBE. For public and community services in Hong Kong.
- Peter Alfred Connell, lately First Secretary (British Council), British Deputy High Commission, Bombay.
- John Neilson Gumming, lately First Secretary, HM Embassy, Khartoum.
- Antony Musgrave Dean, Director of Radio, European Broadcasting Union, Geneva.
- Richard Matthew Denning. For services to the British community in Jedda.
- Dr. Rex Trigger Ellis. For services to the development of the tea industry in Malawi.
- Francis Louis Galliano. For public services in Gibraltar.
- Pierre Guy de Kersaint Giraudeau. For services to British commercial interests in Morocco.
- Vincent Herbert Harding. For services to British commercial interests in Kenya.
- Valerie Edith Mary Hartles, MBE, First Secretary (Administration), HM Embassy, Washington.
- Michael George Hartley. For services to British commercial interests in Japan.
- Sidney Walter Robert Hickman. For services to British commercial interests in Mexico.
- Kenneth Carr Hunter. For services to British commercial and community interests in São Paulo.
- Thomas Carroll Jefferson, Financial Secretary, Cayman Islands.
- William Hayton Jefferson, lately Cultural Attaché (British Council), HM Embassy, Abu Dhabi.
- Michael Kan Yuet-loong. For public services in Hong Kong.
- Dr. Ian Kennedy. For medical services to the community in Botswana.
- William Robert Jackson Laing, Director Regional Commonwealth Development Office, Costa Rica.
- Desmond Ernest Leweson, Attached to Department of Defence, Australia.
- Professor Brian Lofts, Head of Department of Zoology, University of Hong Kong.
- Donald Ross Mackay. For services to the development of the banana industry in the Windward Islands.
- Basil Peter Martin. For services to British commercial interests in Burma.
- Derek Melville Mitchell. First Secretary and Consul, HM Embassy, Paris.
- Peter Alfred Penfold, Deputy British High Commissioner, Kampala.
- William Lyall Crook Petrie. For services to the British community in Bangladesh.
- Kathleen Amy Press. For services to nursing in Jordan.
- Shum Choi-sang, MBE. For community services in Hong Kong.
- William Edward Smith, Deputy Consul-General, British Consulate-General, Montreal.
- James Richard Travis, Consul (Commercial), British Consulate-General, Auckland.

Australian States
State of Queensland

- Dr. Peter John Falconar Grant ED, RFD. For services to the community.
- The Reverend Raymond Fletcher Hunt. For services to the community.
- Victor Barry Paul. For services to the community.
- Graham Bruce Siebenhausen. For services to industry.

State of Tasmania

- Gilbert Colville McKinlay. For services to the retailing industry.

==== Member of the Order of the British Empire (MBE) ====
Military Division

Royal Navy

- Lieutenant Commander George William Barras.
- Lieutenant Commander Michael Lawrence Blackham.
- Lieutenant Commander Edward Charles Bond.
- Chief Petty Officer Marine Engineering Mechanic Ian Cameron (K965337P).
- Lieutenant Commander (S.C.C.) Jack Cohu, Royal Naval Reserve.
- Warrant Officer Radio Supervisor Albert Deane, RVM.
- Captain James Devin, Royal Marines.
- First Officer (S.C.C.) Betty Holmes, Women's Royal Naval Reserve.
- Lieutenant Commander Thomas George Todd Lowree.
- Warrant Officer Marine Engineering Mechanic (Mechanical) Peter Charles Morris.
- Warrant Officer Marine Engineering Artificer Robert Nelson.
- Lieutenant Commander Frederick Stanley Owens.
- Lieutenant Commander James William Purvis.
- Lieutenant) Commander John Patrick Tilley.
- Lieutenant Commander (S.C.C.) John Frederick Underhay, Royal Naval Reserve.

Army

- Major (Quartermaster) Alan Edward Abbott (501441), Royal Corps of Signals.
- Major John Michael Allen (445776), Corps of Royal Engineers.
- 24248494 Warrant Officer Class 2 John Bailey, Queen's Own Highlanders (Seaforth and Camerons).
- Major Robert Charles Kirkwood Baynes (482162), Army Air Corps.
- Major Hector Patrick Maurice Chambers (481745), The Royal Irish Rangers (27th Inniskilling) 83rd and 87th).
- 23464573 Warrant Officer Class 2 Peter James Cole, Intelligence Corps.
- Major John James Collins, BEM, (502507), Corps of Royal Military Police.
- 24015860 Warrant Officer Class 2 Daniel Connor, Royal Regiment of Artillery.
- Major Michael Stanley O'Farrell Cook (508307), Wessex Regiment, Territorial Army.
- LS/23212007 Warrant Officer Class 2 Ralph Ernest William Croucher, Royal Regiment of Artillery.
- Major Stewart Paul Etheridge, TD, (463199), Mercian Volunteers, Territorial Army.
- Major Paul Anthony Dennis Evans (488428), Royal Corps of Transport.
- Major Michael Robert Fredericks (489526), Corps of Royal Electrical and Mechanical Engineers.
- Major (Brevet Lieutenant Colonel) Lawrence Gemson, TD, (431930), Intelligence Corps, Territorial Army.
- Major (Quartermaster) Peter Andrew Geraghty, BEM, (497562), The Parachute Regiment.
- Captain (Technical Instructor in Gunnery) Reginald John Guille (510818), Royal Regiment of Artillery.
- Major Nicholas Simon Clinton Hall (482749), Army Air Corps.
- Major Richard Henry Gordon Hoare (475171), The Queen's Royal Irish Hussars.
- Major Nigel Keith Paul Hope (491474), Royal Corps of Signals.
- Major Michael Marten Howes (470088), The Royal Regiment of Wales (24th/41st Foot).
- Captain (Acting Major) (Gurkha Commissioned Officer) Karnabahadur Rai (492629), 10th Princess Mary's Own Gurkha Rifles.
- 23860071 Warrant Officer Class 2 Cecil Kenneth Keightley, Royal Army Pay Corps, Territorial Army.
- Captain (Quartermaster) Ewan Lawrie (505022), Scots Guards.
- Major David Andrew Lynam (491493), Royal Corps of Signals.
- The Reverend Hamish Baxter Maclagan, Chaplain to the Forces 3rd Class (439472), Royal Army Chaplains' Department.
- LS/23051656 Warrant Officer Class 2 Ian McDonald, Queen's Own Highlanders (Seaforth and Camerons).
- Major (Electrical Mechanical Assistant Engineer) Alan James Morton (496604), Corps of Royal Electrical and Mechanical Engineers.
- Major James Gordon Lindsay Murray (433196), Royal Corps of Transport.
- Major Peter Michael Poole (485806), Royal Corps of Transport.
- Captain Philip Andrew Richardson (516221), Intelligence Corps.
- Major Timothy Stewart Richmond, TD, (492648), Royal Regiment of Artillery, Territorial Army.
- Major Donald William Scott (489208), The Royal Highland Fusiliers (Princess Margaret's Own Glasgow and Ayrshire Regiment).
- Major David Strudley (485840),. 9th/12th Royal Lancers (Prince of Wales's).
- Major (Director of Music) Derek Noel Taylor (487439), Welsh Guards.
- Major John Macintosh Taylor (443573), Royal Corps of Transport.
- Captain Peter Taylor (481691), The King's Own Royal Border Regiment, Territorial Army.
- Captain John Edward Thomas (499777), Royal Corps of Signals.
- Captain (Acting Major) Ronald Sinclair Thomson, TD, (489639), Special Air Service Regiment, Territorial Army.
- Major Sidney Bertie Whitmore (430482), Royal Regiment of Artillery.
- Acting Captain Cyril Thomas Wiles (494069), Army Cadet Force, Territorial Army.
- Major Desmond Francis Williamson (420962), Royal Regiment of Artillery.
- Major John Ross Wyatt (484063), Corps of Royal Engineers.

Overseas Award

- Warrant Officer Class 1 Chi-Leung Pau, Royal Hong Kong Regiment (The Volunteers).

Royal Air Force

- Squadron Leader Colin Scott Musgrave Anderson (608023).
- Squadron Leader (now Wing Commander) Thomas Bradley (4233232).
- Squadron Leader (now Wing Commander) Andrew John Burton (5202437).
- Squadron Leader Kenneth Charles Clifford (4049322).
- Squadron Leader Martin Freeland Fergus Common (2619887).
- Squadron Leader Robert Michael Sheraton Cook (4231014).
- Squadron Leader Peter Douglas Cunningham (587647).
- Squadron Leader Melvyn Frank Charles James (5201616).
- Squadron Leader (now Wing Commander) Edward Percy Kendall (3522785).
- Squadron Leader Ivan Lancaster, AE, (2602510), Royal Auxiliary Air Force.
- Squadron Leader John Robert Douglas Morley (4233213).
- Squadron Leader Christopher Thomas Martyn Nelson (3527329).
- Squadron Leader (now Wing Commander) Brian Edward Rogers (1960798).
- Squadron Leader Kieron Dermot Shaw (4284095).
- Squadron Leader Patricia Daphne Surridge, ARRC, (408249), Princess Mary's Royal Air Force Nursing Service.
- Squadron Leader Norman Richard Tench (4231956).
- Flight Lieutenant Alan Melvyn Bouchard (8026332).
- Flight Lieutenant William Bright (207453), Royal Air Force Volunteer Reserve (Training).
- Flight Lieutenant Gareth Davies (2574501).
- Flight Lieutenant Hywel Frederick James Evans (8026329).
- Flight Lieutenant Ian Francis Harper (4233571).
- Warrant Officer Andrew Shearer Brown (R4123826).
- Warrant Officer Raymond Stephen Buller (V0589751).
- Warrant Officer Charles Cuthbertson Dewar (T0681569).
- Warrant Officer John Charles Parsons (R4080794).
- Warrant Officer Michael Rickett (P4174949).

Civil Division

- Gilbert Sydney Aaron, Head, Physical Education Department, South Glamorgan Institute of Higher Education.
- Philip Wesson Abbott, Training Courses Officer, Sea Cadet Corps.
- Harry Abraham, Manager, Technical Staff Aircraft Group, Warton Division, British Aerospace plc.
- Margaret Adams, Chairwoman, York House Residents' Association, Bradford.
- Alan Aitchison, Chief Executive, Anglo-Scottish Fish Producers' Organisation.
- Basil Edward Allen, Retained Station Officer, Gloucestershire Fire and Rescue Service.
- Bernard William Allen, Area Works Officer, Commonwealth War Graves Commission.
- Ernest Allen, Superintendent, Royal Ulster Constabulary.
- Betty Anderson, lately Village Sister, Whiteley Homes.
- Phyllis Andrews, lately Clerical Officer, Department of Health and Social Security.
- Lewis Percy Angell. For services to historic churches.
- Ronald Douglas Ashby, lately Head of Accounts Section, Civil Service Sports Council.
- Georgina Winifred Attwood, Secretary, Moreton-in-Marsh and District Agricultural and Horse Show Society.
- William Ernest Austen, Chief Clerk Superintendent, Whip's Office, House of Commons.
- Victor William Aycock, Scientific Glassworker, Royal Postgraduate Medical School, Hammersmith Hospital.
- Kenneth Bailey, Product Development Manager, Guided Weapons Division, Marconi Defence Systems Ltd. For services to Export.
- Paul Baker, Regional Secretary, Greater London Region, Abbeyfield Society.
- Leslie Vincent Herbert Baldwin, Coaching Manager, Southern Vectis Omnibus Company Ltd.
- Catherine Lily Baxter, lately Organiser, Rochester Citizens' Advice Bureau.
- Dorothy Mary Rachel Bayes, Chairman, Wanstead and Woodford Association for the Blind and Partially Sighted.
- Lawrence Gordon Bayley. For political and public service.
- John Ernest Beal. For political and public service.
- William Charles George Beaumont, Higher Clerical Officer, Dental Estimates Board.
- Joyce May Alice Beckwith, Area Superintendent, South Western Area, Greater London Division, St. John Ambulance Brigade.
- David Fyffe Begg, Principal Orthotist, Stracathro Hospital, Brechin.
- Jane Mary Benham. For services to the East Coast Sail Trust.
- Mary Walkinshaw Bett, Executive Officer, Scottish Agricultural Organisation Society Ltd.
- Mari Scott Bicknell, For services to the Cambridge Ballet Workshop.
- Vera Primrose Annie Birkett, Executive Officer, Department of Health and Social Security.
- Charles William Blagg, Chairman, Cheshire and Staffordshire Agricultural Wages Committee.
- Pauline Dorothy Blight, Director of Nursing Services, Bloomsbury Health Authority.
- Susan Thelma Bosence, Textile Designer.
- William Bowie, MC. For services to the Boys' Brigade, particularly in Glasgow.
- Maurice Gordon Bowyer, Chairman, Dorset Quality Pigs Marketing Group.
- Peter Bradsell, Chief Techniques Engineer, Plessey Radar Ltd.
- Stanley Henry Brain, Chairman and Joint Managing Director, Arrow Plastics Ltd.
- Stanley Peter Branton. For services to agricultural education.
- Francis Hutton Dunlop Brennan, lately Deputy Principal, Department of the Environment, Northern Ireland.
- Amy Dorothy Bromley. For political and public service.
- Evelyn Mabel Brown, Clinical Manager, MacMillan Unit, Nightingale Home, Derby, Southern Derbyshire Health Authority.
- Sheila Mary Brown, Member, Durham County Council.
- Mary Hope Buckston. For services to the community in Derbyshire.
- Margaret Alison Budd. For political service.
- Eric Albert Burley, lately Senior Executive Officer, Manpower Services Commission.
- Sheila Joy Bushby. For political service.
- Ellen Mary Byrne, Senior Nurse, Psychiatric Unit, Severalls Hospital, North East Essex Health Authority.
- James Nicholson Cadman, Proprietor, W. Haswell & Son. For services to Chester Cathedral.
- Gilbert William Cantell. For services to the community in Buckingham and district.
- John Cardwell, Superintendent, City of London Police.
- Terence Osborne Carr, Manager, Wiggin Alloys Ltd.
- Charles Ronald Catherall. For political and public service.
- Doris Muriel Chapman, Manager, Development and Database, Personnel and Resources, International HQ, Rank Xerox Ltd.
- Samuel Chapman, Senior Probation Officer, Northern Ireland Probation Service.
- Edwin Chicken, Assistant Regional Engineer, Northern Regional Health Authority.
- Harry John Christopher, Staff Correspondent, Wales, Daily Express.
- Ronald Stanley Clark, Employment Officer, The Regular Forces' Employment Association.
- Jean Margaret Clarke, District Librarian, St Thomas' Hospital, London.
- John Patrick Clift. For services to mentally disabled people in Warwickshire.
- Joseph William Clowes, Scheme Manager, Ellesmere Port Training Centre, Royal British Legion.
- Captain Peter John Collier, Chief Executive, Londonderry Port and Harbour Commissioners.
- Kathryn Jane Cook. For services to Athletics.
- Paul Derek Cook, Chairman, Scientifica—Cook Ltd.
- Ronald Walter Cook, TD, Managing Director, Bacofoil Containers Ltd.
- Harold George Cooper, Higher Executive Officer, Department of Health and Social Security.
- William Cormack, Veterinary Surgeon, Wick.
- Alice May Cottam, Trade Secretary, The Publishers Association.
- Hilda Irene Court. For political and public service.
- Major Ralph George Covington Covell, Governor and Chairman, St Clement Danes School, Chorley Wood, Hertfordshire.
- Reginald Jean Albert Covey, Area Horticultural Officer, Commonwealth War Graves' Commission.
- Alban Edward Cox, lately Foreign and Commonwealth Office.
- Joyce Evelyn Cox, Higher Executive Officer, Board of Customs and Excise.
- Stephen Cram. For services to Athletics.
- Joyce Crompton, Secretary/Clerical Officer, Greater Manchester Probation Service.
- Agnes Crook. For services to the Octagon Theatre, Bolton.
- Donald Hartley Crook. For political and public service.
- John Edward Curry, Senior State Enrolled Nurse, Chesterton Hospital, Cambridge.
- Nancy Mary Dancer, Manager, Conferences and Exhibitions, The Institution of Production Engineers.
- Albert Glyn Davies, lately Chief Land Surveyor, Cheshire County Council.
- Evelyn Davies, Inspector, Further Education (English Language), London Borough of Ealing.
- Idris Charles Davies. For services to agriculture in Wales.
- Noel Gwyn Davies, Conductor, Pontarddulais Male Choir.
- Peter Brian Davis, Regional Civil Engineer, Eastern Region, British Railways.
- Fay Thirlwell Davison, Higher Executive Officer, Department of Health and Social Security.
- Dora Dawson, Member, Northern Community Health Council.
- Edward Day, Member, Guild of Air Pilots and Navigators.
- Peter John Aleyne Del Strother. For services to the Institution of Mechanical Engineering.
- Frank Dennett, Member, Nottingham City Council.
- Albert Edward Dollimore, lately Membership Officer, The Youth Hostels' Association.
- Sidney Edward Dolphin, lately Assistant Area Surveyor, Oxfordshire County Council.
- Margaret Smith Haldane Donaldson, lately Senior Personal Secretary, Scottish Office.
- Eileen Margaret Doncaster (Miss Dupont). For political and public service.
- Simon Millar Downs, General Manager, British Petroleum, Exploration Company Ltd. (Ireland).
- Percy Skipworth Duff. For services to the community in Kendal, Cumbria.
- Robert Beauchamp (Robin) Duff, Chairman, Air Transport Users' Committee.
- Jean MacDonald Duguid, Higher Executive Officer, Ministry of Defence.
- William Joseph Dunlop. For services to Motor Cycle Racing.
- Reginald Leonard Dunne, Vice-President, National Federation of Far Eastern Prisoner of War Clubs and Associations.
- Dorothea Eadie, Higher Executive Officer, Ministry of Defence.
- Aubrey Clifford Patterson Edge, Works Safety Officer, Capenhurst, British Nuclear Fuels plc.
- Heulwen Elizabeth Egerton, Chairman of Management Committee and Director of Nursing Services, St. David's Foundation, Newport.
- Robert Allan Elliott, lately Organising Secretary, Kent Association of Boys' Clubs.
- Joan McKinnel Ellis, Director, Nursing Services (Midwifery), North Derbyshire Health Authority.
- Margaret Betty Ellis. For political service.
- John William Euston, Captain of the Belfry and Warden, St Margaret's, Westminster.
- John Richard Evans, Secretary, Association of Welsh Community Health Councils.
- Augustine Mary Fairweather, Commandant, City of Perth Company, St. Andrew's Ambulance Corps.
- Victor Napoleon Farrugia, lately Clerical Officer, Ministry of Defence.
- George William Fernyhough, lately Senior Executive Officer, Manpower Services Commission.
- Leonard Bertram Fiddock, lately General Manager, Associated Container Transportation.
- Bernard Fishman, Higher Executive Officer, Department of Health and Social Security.
- Jean Foster, Training Officer, Office Personnel and Systems, Rolls-Royce Ltd.
- John Francome. For services to National Hunt Racing.
- Derek Freeman, Breeding and Puppy Walking Manager, Guide Dogs for the Blind Association.
- Elizabeth French, Headteacher, Westgate Hill Infants School, Newcastle upon Tyne.
- Ronald Montague Gair, Manager, Foreign Office Press, HM Stationery Office.
- Samuel Gardiner, Member, Board of Visitors, HM Prison Maze.
- Diana Vaughan Gaskell, Group Superintendent Physiotherapist, National Heart and Chest Hospitals, London.
- Valerie Ann Gillespie, Chairman, Rural Committee, Nottingham Community Council.
- Horace Gilmore. For political service.
- Margaret Olive Gilmore. For services to disabled people in Stafford.
- Rita May Gilmour, Chairman, New Urban Housing Association Ltd.
- William Glover, Factory Manager, Rose Forgrove Ltd.
- Joan Grant, County Organiser, North Yorkshire, Women's Royal Voluntary Service.
- Rosa Secontina Grasso, Senior Executive Officer, Department of the Environment.
- William Uttley Henry Gregg, Chairman and Managing Director, Gregg & Co. (Knottingley) Ltd.
- June Rose Groom. For services to Gymnastics in the North of England.
- Norman Harold Grove, Chairman, James Grove & Sons Ltd.
- Denys Ralph Hadden, lately Secretary, Plant Breeding Institute, Agricultural and Food Research Council.
- Ronald Halmshaw, Technical Editor, The British Journal of Non-Destructive Testing.
- Alan Hambridge, Professional and Technology Officer I, Ministry of Defence.
- Valerie Ann Hargreaves, Editor, Fire Magazine.
- Mary Richardson Stables Harper, Higher Executive Officer, Board of Customs and Excise.
- John Sherwood Harrison, Inspector, Metropolitan Police.
- John Victor Harrison, lately Chief Clerk, Faculty Office of the Archbishop of Canterbury.
- Sylvia Irene Hasted, lately Senior Personal Secretary, Parliamentary Counsel Office.
- Kenneth Haswell, Project Safety Officer, Laing-Mowlem-ARC-Joint Venture, Falkland Islands.
- Roy Percy Hawker, Stores Officer, Northern Ireland Airports Ltd.
- Elizabeth Ann Hawtin, Personal Assistant to Chairman, British Airways.
- Colonel James Samuel Haywood, ERD, Curator, Prison Service Museum, Leyhill.
- Christina Robertson Henney, Research Officer (Nursing), Tayside Health Board.
- William Herlingshaw, Member, Gas Consumers' Northern Council.
- Margaret Sheila Hewitson. For political service.
- Shirley May Hill, Head, Ladywell Nursery Centre, Salford.
- Margaret Mabel Hitchcock, Senior Personal Secretary, Department of Trade and Industry.
- Derek Warr Hobbs, Principal Engineer, Fisher Controls Ltd.
- Elizabeth Lindsey Hobbs. For services to Water Ski-ing.
- Agnes Finlayson Hoey, Conductor, Glasgow Youth Choir.
- Walter Thomas Hogg, Chief Inspector, Strathclyde Police.
- Alan MacDonald Holland, Higher Executive Officer, Department of Health and Social Security.
- Mary Sabrina Howarth, lately Secretary, British Malleable Tube Fittings Association.
- James Frederic Howes. For political and public service.
- Charles Arthur Hubbard, lately Director of Nursing Services, Papworth Hospital, East Anglia Health Authority.
- Norman Humphries, Tax Officer (Higher Grade), Board of Inland Revenue.
- Douglas John Huxley, Principal Doorkeeper, House of Lords.
- Constance Jackson, lately Committee Administrator, South Yorkshire County Council.
- Kenneth Jackson, Managing Director, The Alumina Company Ltd.
- John James Jefford. For political and public service.
- Heather Margaret Jenyns. For political and public service.
- Menna John, Senior Nursing Officer, Swansea Head Office, The Post Office.
- Eric Jones, Architecture Course Director, North London Polytechnic.
- Heather Gertrude Jones, lately Senior Education Adviser, Royal National Institute for the Blind.
- Kathleen Dora Jordan. For political and public service.
- Elizabeth Kenward, Journalist, Harpers & Queen.
- Adam Oliver Kerr, Personnel Assistant, The L. S. Starrett Company Ltd.
- Eugene Stubbs King, Divisional Officer, Metropolitan Ambulance Service, Yorkshire Regional Health Authority.
- John King, Owner/Manager, West Coast Sea Products Ltd., Kirkcudbright.
- Lieutenant Colonel Robert Fry Kirby, DSO, (Retd.), Provincial Organiser (United Kingdom), The Forces Help Society and Lord Roberts Workshops.
- Brian Alexander Lambie, Director, Biggar Museum Trust.
- Colonel John Sidney Lancaster, DL, Secretary and Welfare Officer, Chindits Old Comrades Association.
- Henrietta Myrtle Lane. For services to the community in Richmond.
- Eric Duncan Grant Langmuir. For services to Mountaineering in Scotland.
- Percy John Le Huray, Factory Manager, Aberdeen, Remploy.
- Edward Arthur Lee, lately Executive Officer, Health and Safety Executive, Department of Employment.
- Neville Laurence Roy Lee, Senior Executive Officer, Department of Health and Social Security.
- Peter Arthur Lee, Sector Scientific Adviser, Metropolitan Sector, Horsham, United Kingdom Warning and Monitoring Organisation.
- Sydney Graham Leete, Director, J. Leete & Son Ltd.
- William Robert Lewington, lately County Forestry Officer, Staffordshire County Council.
- Betty Mary Lewis, Executive Officer, Lord Chancellor's Department.
- George Dominic Leydon, Station Manager, Ratcliffe-on-Soar Power Station, Midlands Region, CEGB.
- Elizabeth Anne Livingstone. For services to Patristic Studies.
- William Lowe, Chairman and Welfare Officer, Bedford Branch, The Royal Air Forces Association.
- Ian Macaskill, Chairman, North Uist Community Council.
- John MacDonald, Assistant to the Chief Executive, Glenrothes Development Corporation.
- Alasdair MacGregor, Marine Services Officer, Ministry of Defence.
- Donald Mackenzie, Senior Executive Officer, Department of Employment.
- John MacLennan. For services to the community in Brora, Sutherland.
- John Morrison MacLeod, lately Deputy Director of Education, Highland Region.
- Brenda Grace Mannion, Specialist Typist, Board of Inland Revenue.
- Stanley Grenville March, TD, lately Secretary, Tyne Mariners' Benevolent Institution.
- Myra Maisie Marks, Member, Council of the National Advertising Benevolent Society.
- Stanley Harry Marsh. For services to youth training in Fulham.
- Wendy Barbara Frances Matthews, Home Service Adviser, British Gas Corporation.
- Albert McCaffrey, Chief Superintendent, Royal Ulster Constabulary.
- James Henry Francis McGahan, Turbomeca Liaison Representative, Rolls-Royce Ltd.
- Fergus Dunsmore Scott McGhie, lately Principal, Duncraig Castle College, Plockton.
- Margaret Mary McKerrow, Medical Director, Rowcroft Hospice, Torbay.
- Sydney Richard Merrifield, lately Headteacher, Oak Lodge School for the Deaf, Inner London Education Authority.
- Bernard Chester Middleton, Bookbinder.
- Ronald Albert Miller. For services to patients in military hospitals.
- George William Mills, lately Medical Officer, Roxburghe House, Royal Victoria Hospital, Dundee.
- James Mochan, Works Director, Llandudno, Hotpoint Ltd.
- David William Morgan, Marketing Executive, Far East Dynamics Group Headquarters, British Aerospace plc.
- Roger Hedderwick Muirhead, lately Veterinary Officer, Ministry of Agriculture, Fisheries and Food.
- Irene Hazel Murphy, Nursing Sister, Lissue Hospital, Lisburn, County Antrim.
- Kathleen Murphy, Principal, Glenravel School for Mentally Handicapped, Belfast.
- Elizabeth Lydia Nabney. For services to War on Want in Northern Ireland.
- Betty Ferguson Nairne, Officer-in-Charge, Florence Place Day Nursery, Perth.
- Winifred Margaret Noonan, Senior Personal Secretary, Department of Health and Social Security.
- Jenny Gwendoline Norrington. For services to mentally disabled people in Kent.
- Raymond John Edwin Norris, Vice Chairman, Kent Area Manpower Board.
- William Edward Novis, lately Chairman, Specialist Building Committee, Construction Industry Training Board.
- John Henry O'Connor, Staff Officer, Board of Inland Revenue.
- Margaret Mary Geraldine O'Loughlin, Clerical Officer, Ministry of Defence.
- Jack Olden, Public Relations Officer, Scout Association.
- James Alexander Ormiston, TD, Chief Commandant, Greater Manchester Special Constabulary.
- Thomas Edgar Ormiston, Inspector (S), Board of Inland Revenue.
- Robert Love Orr, Chairman, Northern Ireland Auctioneers' Association.
- Norma Lois Paice, Chairman, Ashburnham Community Association.
- Leo Charles Alfred Parkin. For political service.
- David Frederick Pearce, Energy Efficiency Engineer, Nottingham County Council.
- Michael Henry Pearce, Operations Services Coordinator, Avon Division, Severn-Trent Water Authority.
- Joyce Kathleen Pettifer, lately Senior Executive Officer, Ministry of Defence.
- Derek Peter Plant, Landscape and Forestry Manager, Milton Keynes Development Corporation.
- John Roland Platts, lately Senior Executive Officer, Advisory, Conciliation and Arbitration Service.
- Margaret Roys Pope, Assistant Branch Director, Youth and Juniors, Sussex Division, British Red Cross Society.
- Frederick Potts, Group Distribution Director, William Timpson Ltd.
- Elvira Jean Powell, Personal Secretary to Chief Constable, South Wales Constabulary.
- Winifred Ada Probert. For services to visually disabled people in Bristol.
- Eric Pugh, Senior Executive Officer, Department of Health and Social Security.
- John Charles Radley, Personnel Services Officer, Ruston Gas Turbines Ltd.
- Sybil May Reardon, Staff Officer, Department of Health and Social Security, Northern Ireland.
- Elwyn Reed, Chairman, National Joint Council of Approved Driving Instructors Organisations.
- Joyce Mary Reeve, Headmistress, Greenacres Special School, Leicester.
- Henry Anthony Charles Reid, lately Professional and Technology Officer I, Department of Transport.
- Margaret Sophia Rose Roache, lately Executive Officer, Board of Inland Revenue.
- Freda Doris Roberts. For services to the community in Aylesbury, Buckinghamshire.
- John Reid Roberts, Transducer Manufacture and Pre-production Manager, Marconi Underwater Systems Ltd.
- Captain David Matthew Robinson, Head, Department of Nautical Science, South Tyneside College.
- Earle Everard Robinson, Community Youth Worker, Leicester Education Department.
- John Ross, Chairman, Management Committee, Gateshead Citizens' Advice Bureau.
- John Patrick Ruddy, Chief Inspector, South Yorkshire Police.
- Alicia Gertrude Samuel, Chairman, Carib Housing Association.
- Elizabeth Ann Sandell. For services to Tourism in Scotland.
- Joseph Alexander Sayer. For political and public service.
- Henry Francis Morin Scott, Commodore, Square Rigger Club, TS Royalist, Sea Cadet Corps.
- James Scott, Professional and Technology Officer I, Department of the Environment.
- Patrycia Scott, Senior Superintendent of Typists, Board of Inland Revenue.
- Thomas Daniel Scourfield. For services to the Welsh language and culture.
- Muhammed Tufail Shaheen. For services to the community in the West of Scotland.
- Philip Shaw, County Secretary, Essex, National Farmers' Union.
- Peter Leslie Shilton. For services to association football.
- Mary Shirley, Senior Nurse Grade 8, Children's Home Hospital, Strathblane.
- Phyllis Lynda Simon, Area Nursing Officer, Argyll and Clyde Health Board.
- Edith Nadia Slow, lately Administrative Officer (International Affairs), Royal Society.
- Cyril Arthur Smith, Inspector, Board of Inland Revenue.
- Nigel Fearn Clive Smith. For political service.
- Patricia Caroline Solk. For services to the community in Leeds.
- Alfred John Sorrell. For charitable services.
- Ronald Leonard Spruhan, lately National Secretary, National Union of Seamen.
- John Harold Steeds, General Medical Practitioner, Colchester.
- Barbara Steele, Assistant Director of Nursing Services, Bradford Royal Infirmary, Bradford Health Authority.
- James Frederick Stephen, VRD, lately Chairman, Central Govan Housing Association Ltd.
- Joan Margaret Stephens, lately Assistant County Librarian, Western Division, Somerset County Libraries.
- Lindsay John Stewart, Assistant Director, Technical Division, Building Services Research and Information Association.
- Kenneth John Stone, lately Headteacher, Coety Primary School, Bridgend.
- Henri Francis Strzelecki, Joint Chairman and Managing Director, Henri Lloyd Ltd.
- Michael Tarkanyi, Fundamental Development Manager, General Electric Company Large Machines Ltd.
- Kenneth Roland Taylor. For services to the community in Newport, Gwent.
- Shaw Taylor, Television presenter.
- David Glyn Thomas, Chairman, Medway Enterprise Agency Ltd.
- Commander Peter Ivan Thomas, Royal Navy (Retd.), Retired Officer II, Ministry of Defence.
- William Irvine Thompson, Conductor and Musical Director, Ballyclare Male Choir.
- Matthew Hamilton Thomson, Managing Director, M & A Thomson Litho Ltd.
- Herbert James Tilley, Professional and Technology Officer I, Metropolitan Police.
- Norman Reginald Townsend, lately Senior Lecturer, Centre for Fisheries Studies, Humberside College of Higher Education.
- Frederick John Michael Boaden Treweeke, General Dental Practitioner, Burford.
- Mollie Truphet, Chairman, League of Friends, St. Helier Hospital, Surrey.
- Charles William Noel Tuthill, Training Coordinator, Petroleum Training Association, North Sea.
- Arthur Thomas Vincent, Senior Lecturer in Information Technology, Institute of Educational Technology, Open University.
- Reginald Vivian Wake, lately Secretary, Personnel and Training, National Council of Young Men's Christian Associations.
- Dennis Harry Wale, Deputy Managing Director and Technical Director, Marwin Carbide Group Ltd.
- Ann Maria Walker, Development Officer, Multiple Sclerosis Action Group, Northern Ireland.
- Frederick Walters, Warden, Fairfield Centre for Youth, Community and Adult Education, Buxton.
- Mary Priscilla Walters, Assistant Secretary, Welsh Pricing Committee, Welsh Health Technical Services Organisation.
- Bryan Peter Warner. For political service.
- Frances Hilda Warwick, Senior Nurse, Department of Medicine for the Elderly, Amersham General Hospital.
- David Watkins. For services to Rugby League Football.
- John Archibald Shaw Watson, Head Forester, Buccleuch Estates.
- Norman Watson, Area Chief Engineer, North East Area, National Coal Board.
- Norah Lilian Watson, lately Caseworker, Darlington Division, Soldiers' Sailors' and Airmen's Families Association.
- Ronald Victor West. For services to the Royal British Legion in the East Midlands.
- John Frederick White, Deputy Guided Weapon Manufacturing Project Manager, Stevenage Division, British Aerospace plc.
- Mary Maud White, Higher Executive Officer, Home Office.
- Patricia Lilian Whitnall, lately Foreign and Commonwealth Office.
- Edward Wiggham, Organist, HM Prison Coldingley.
- Hector Mark Wilks, lately Chairman, Kent Trust for Nature Conservation.
- Ronald Ian Alan Willshaw, Sales Director, Premier Grip Ltd.
- Minnie Doreen Wright. For political and public service.
- John Wyatt, Chief Ranger, Lake District National Park.
- Phyllis Rose York. For services to the community in Hurst Green, Oxted.

Diplomatic Service and Overseas List

- Lawrence Wilfred Baker. For services to the community in Kerala, India.
- Luis Manuel Bernardo. For services to the community in Bermuda.
- Adelaide Marie Therese Canessa. For services to education in Gibraltar.
- Irene Cheung Yok-luen. For community services in Hong Kong.
- John Anthony Collins. For public services in the Cayman Islands.
- Marie Renee Solange Drinkwater. For services to the British community in Marseilles.
- Anthony Vernon Basil Farnfield. For services to British aviation interests in Poland.
- Giuseppina Gilbey, Consular Assistant, British Consulate-General, Naples.
- Dr. Claire Grece-Dabrowska. For services to English language teaching in Poland.
- John Max Gysin, Vice-Consul (Commercial), British Consulate-General, Zurich.
- William Charles Harrison. For educational services to the British community in Riyadh, Saudi Arabia.
- Dr. James Barrie Hollinrake, Senior Medical Officer, Medical and Health Department, Hong Kong.
- Alan Hough. For services, to the British community in Managua.
- Ian Richard Ross Innes. For services to British interests in Kuwait.
- Kenneth Richard Jenkins, Principal Government Engineer, Public Works Department, Hong Kong.
- Kong Wai-kwan, Senior Superintendent, Customs and Excise Service, Hong Kong.
- Francis Langlais, lately Accountant-General, Montserrat.
- Lee Jark-pui. For community services in Hong Kong.
- Kynoch Gillies MacDonald. For services to forestry development in Liberia.
- Gabrielle Augusta Patricia Mackinnon. For services to the British community in Mallorca.
- Mora Catherine McNeill, Personal Assistant, British High Commission, Wellington.
- Stelios Nicolas Michaelides, Chief Clerk, British East Mediterranean Radio Station, Cyprus.
- Geraldine Norman, Chief Nursing Officer, British Virgin Islands.
- Julian Frederick Parr. For services to British commercial interests in Cologne.
- Krishnadas Hirabhai Patel, lately Accounts Clerk, British High Commission, Nairobi.
- Rodney Elizabeth Richards, Personal Secretary, British High Commission, Nairobi.
- Emily Anne Rose, Second Secretary and Consul, HM Embassy, Helsinki.
- Arthur Norman Sanderson, Assistant Representative, British Council, Ghana.
- Jerome Eugene Scannell. For services to British commercial and community interests in Barcelona.
- Robert Postlewaite Scarborough, Accountant, HM Embassy, Bangkok.
- John Charles Eugene Strugnell. For services to British interests in Zaire.
- Tai Kuen. For community services in Hong Kong.
- Hedley Dennis Thomas, First Secretary (Works) HM Embassy Riyadh, Saudi Arabia.
- Yu Pui-lam, Deputy Cadet Commandant, Civil Aid Services, Hong Kong.

Australian States
State of Queensland

- Councillor Ewen Archibald Donald Cameron. For public service.
- Bruce Alpin Campbell. For voluntary services
- James Corbett. For services to the community.
- Douglas Campbell Mactaggart. For voluntary service and services to rural industry.
- Jean May Myers. For services to education.
- Gordon Basil Rose. For services to the Aboriginal community.
- James Frederick Thomas Scrimgeour. For services to the community.

State of Tasmania

- Mollie Campbell-Smith. For services to education and to the community.
- William Winspear Terry. For public service.

=== Companion of the Imperial Service Order (ISO) ===
Home Civil Service

- Dennis Herbert Allen, lately Principal, Department of Education and Science.
- David Rex Baxter, Principal Officer, Department of the Environment for Northern Ireland.
- Leslie Bryant, Inspector (P), Board of Inland Revenue.
- Donald William Buchanan, lately Principal Professional and Technology Officer, Ministry of Defence.
- David Anthony Clayton, Principal Professional and Technology Officer, Ministry of Defence.
- John Roderick Dunsmore, Senior Principal Scientific Officer, Overseas Development Administration.
- Lawrence Flowers, lately Senior Principal, Ministry of Defence.
- John Horace Francis Green, Principal Professional and Technology Officer, Department of Transport.
- Kenneth Clifford Hall, lately Principal, Department of Trade and Industry.
- Donald Douglas Hardy, Senior Principal Scientific Officer, Ministry of Defence.
- Brian Ernest Hawkins, Principal Lecturer, Ministry of Defence.
- William Thomas Hull, MBE, Foreign and Commonwealth Office.
- Conrad Knowles, lately Principal, Department of Employment.
- Thomas, Noon, Principal, Ministry of Agriculture, Fisheries and Food.
- Robert Malachy Roddy, Divisional Veterinary Officer, Department of Agriculture for Northern Ireland.
- George Norman Smith, Inspector (SP), Board of Inland Revenue.
- John Orkney Starling, Senior Examiner, Patent Office.
- Pamela Patricia Thayer, lately Assistant Chief Inspector, Department of Health and Social Security.
- William Anthony Vinall, lately Principal, Welsh Office.
- James Weir, lately Principal, Department of Health and Social Security.
- William Weir, Principal, Scottish Education Department.
- Robert Woods, Grade 6, Department of the Environment.

Diplomatic Service and Overseas List

- Morris Cyril Morgan, Director, Technical Education and Industrial Training Department, Hong Kong.

Australian States
State of Queensland

- James Alfred John Smart. For public service.

State of Tasmania

- Athol Laurence Eiszele. For public service.

=== British Empire Medal (BEM) ===
Military Division

Royal Navy

- Chief Petty Officer Medical Assistant John Cotton Cochrane, D050890X.
- Colour Sergeant Malcolm Allan Crone, Royal Marines, P021653W.
- Colour Sergeant Kenneth Barton Crouch, Royal Marines, P022736Y.
- Corporal Peter John Billing, Royal Marines, P033137U.
- Chief Petty Officer Airman (Survival Equipment) Vivian Lancelot Fulford-Owen, D081797A.
- Chief Radio Supervisor Norman Guest, J246402C.
- Charge Chief Marine Engineering Artificer (Propulsion) Charles George Hart, K926827B.
- Master-at-Arms Robert Stephen Hedges, D063702K.
- Regulating Petty Officer Kevin Paul Lestrange, D149992B.
- Chief Petty Officer (Aircraft handler) (Falc) James Syme Logan, D071078G.
- Chief Petty Officer (Operations) (Careers Adviser) Peter Jesse Lukes, J830697U.
- Chief Marine Engineering Mechanic (Electrical) Henry Carson Macartney, M964440M.
- Chief Petty Officer Writer David Pemberton Maule, D082256R.
- Chief Petty Officer (Operations) (Sonar) (Submarines) Paul Bernard Moore, D063850H.
- Chief Petty Officer (Operations) (Sonar) George Patrick Morralee, D185644V.
- Chief Petty Officer (Diver) William Neil Primrose, D176407M.
- Chief Petty Officer Marine Engineering Artificer (Hull) Derek Neale Rainer, D069617H.
- Chief Communications Technician David Rees, D075338V.
- Chief Petty Officer (Operations) (Missile) Roy Smalley, J760499F.
- Sergeant Bryan Wood, Royal Marines, P025232A.

Army

- 24435792 Corporal John Asken, Royal Corps of Transport.
- 24020537 Sergeant (Acting Staff Sergeant) Michael Patrick Bardwell, The Royal Hampshire Regiment.
- 24202560 Sergeant Thomas John Barrie, Corps of Royal Electrical and Mechanical Engineers.
- 24209596 Sergeant Peter Paul Bartman, Corps of Royal Engineers.
- 24304487 Sergeant Guy Bramfitt, Corps of Royal Electrical and Mechanical Engineers.
- 24370646 Sergeant Clive James Brown, Royal Army Veterinary Corps.
- LS/22307269 Staff Sergeant Charles Joseph Patrick Bryson, 4th/7th Royal Dragoon Guards.
- 24127956 Staff Sergeant Anthony James Byrne, Royal Corps of Signals, Territorial Army.
- 24063229 Sergeant (Acting Staff Sergeant) James Stanley Alexander Callingham, Corps of Royal Electrical and Mechanical Engineers.
- 24340747 Sergeant (Acting Staff Sergeant) Robert Lovett Clark, Intelligence Corps.
- 23723626 Staff Sergeant John Collins, Royal Corps of Transport, Territorial Army.
- 23906101 Staff Sergeant William Callahan Connolly, Royal Regiment of Artillery.
- W/370797 Sergeant Marjorie Jean Cox, Women's Royal Army Corps, Territorial Army.
- 24008464 Staff Sergeant Alexander Morton Davie, Corps of Royal Engineers.
- 24108691 Staff Sergeant James William Dempsie, Army Air Corps.
- 24026619 Sergeant Paul Gavin Doherty, The Queen's Lancashire Regiment.
- 23546458 Staff Sergeant Peter Doherty, The King's Regiment, Territorial Army.
- 24068788 Staff Sergeant Andrew Christopher Sam Douglas, Corps of Royal Engineers.
- W/459016 Corporal (Acting Sergeant) Susan Irene Dowley, Women's Royal Army Corps (now discharged).
- 24091296 Staff Sergeant David Eastqn, Corps of Royal Military Police.
- 24109511 Staff Sergeant Stewart Elkin-Walker, Royal Army Medical Corps.
- 24090336 Corporal Patrick Feeney, The Light Infantry.
- 23725470 Staff Sergeant Percy Gilbert Frost, 9th/12th Royal Lancers.
- 21157522 Staff Sergeant Ganbahadur Gurung, 10th Princess Mary's Own Gurkha Rifles.
- 24326414 Staff Sergeant Alan Winston Gill, Corps of Royal Electrical and Mechanical Engineers.
- 24158238 Sergeant James Riley Urquhart Grant, The Royal Scots Dragoon Guards (Carabiniers and Greys).
- 24141198 Sergeant Stephen Douglas Grimwade, Army Physical Training Corps.
- 24018051 Staff Sergeant Alan Edward Grisdale, Royal Corps of Signals.
- 24221972 Corporal James Hanratty, The Gloucestershire Regiment.
- 23525126 Sergeant Edward Daniel Keith Hawley, Royal Corps of Transport.
- 22213879 Sergeant William Matthew Hickey, The Royal Irish Rangers (27th (Inniskilling) 83rd and 87th) Territorial Army.
- 24189792 Staff Sergeant Michael John Hughes, Intelligence Corps (now discharged).
- 21158699 Sergeant Khembahadur Limbu, 7th Duke of Edinburgh's Own Gurkha Rifles.
- 22470038 Corporal Harry Little, The Light Infantry, Territorial Army.
- 24000465 Staff Sergeant Alfred Lowrie, Army Catering Corps.
- 24175468 Staff Sergeant Thomas Alban Lynch, Intelligence Corps.
- 24318503 Staff Sergeant Roger David Marshall, Intelligence Corps'.
- 24327925 Sergeant John Gerard McAulay, Corps of Royal Electrical and Mechanical Engineers.
- 24065782 Staff Sergeant Robert Henry McLoughlin, Military Provost Staff Corps.
- 23958975 Staff Sergeant Stuart Mellors, Royal Corps of Transport.
- 21159985 Corporal Narbahadur Gurung, 2nd King Edward VII's Own Gurkha Rifles (The Sirmoor Rifles).
- 24113831 Staff Sergeant Dennis Phillipson, Royal Regiment of Artillery.
- 24195798 Staff Sergeant Lee Spencer Pilling, Royal Corps of Signals.
- 24124697 Staff Sergeant Sydney Roy Please, Royal Corps of Transport.
- 24180240 Corporal (Acting Sergeant) Norman Hunter Porter, The Parachute Regiment.
- 24168999 Staff Sergeant David Quinn, Corps of Royal Engineers.
- 23738257 Staff Sergeant Michael Rattigan, DCM, The Royal Green Jackets (now discharged).
- 2380017 Sergeant Terence David Reynolds, Royal Corps of Signals (now discharged).
- 23494964 Sergeant Robert Frank Richardson, Royal Army Medical Corps, Territorial Army.
- 23524314 Staff Sergeant Brian George Smith, The Queen's Regiment, Territorial Army.
- 24179911 Sergeant (Acting Staff Sergeant) Dennis John Spears, Corps of Royal Engineers.
- 23902083 Staff Sergeant Kenneth Michael Spencer, Royal Corps of Transport, Territorial Army.
- 24341382 Staff Sergeant Paul Lawrence Stanton, Army Air Corps.
- 24209154 Staff Sergeant Alan James Stocksley, Corps of Royal Engineers.
- 23979832 Sergeant Boleslaw Szafran, Royal Corps of Transport.
- 24131791 Staff Sergeant (now Warrant Officer Class 2) Sidney David Taylor, 13th/18th Royal Hussars (Queen Mary's Own).
- 24298578 Staff Sergeant Philip Albert Temminck, The Worcestershire and Sherwood Foresters Regiment (29th/45th Foot).
- 24387485 Sergeant William Henry Thompson, Corps of Royal Electrical and Mechanical Engineers, Territorial Army.
- 21015561 Sergeant Richard Thornton, Royal Army Pay Corps, Territorial Army.
- 24018869 Staff Sergeant Denis Brian Paltridge Usher, Royal Corps of Signals.
- 24066280 Staff Sergeant (now Warrant Officer Class 2) Roger Jack Wadsworth, Corps of Royal Engineers.
- 23956104 Sergeant George Walker, Royal Corps of Signals.
- 24017126 Sergeant Geoffrey Julian Ward, The Queen's Lancashire Regiment.
- 23965713 Staff Sergeant Gordon Watson, The Parachute Regiment.
- 23988970 Corporal Alan Raymond Whiting, The Prince of Wales's Own Regiment of Yorkshire. (now discharged).
- 24195547 Staff Sergeant (now Warrant Officer Class 2) David Wright, Royal Corps of Signals.

Overseas Award

- Corporal Chun-hung Chan, Royal Hong Kong Regiment (The Volunteers).

Royal Air Force

- C1939007 Flight Sergeant James Aspinwall.
- S2778369 Flight Sergeant John Joseph Batey.
- J0687870 Flight Sergeant Martin Thomas Bean.
- K4034790 Flight Sergeant Patrick Trevor Stephen Lennox Bigger.
- P0680720 Flight Sergeant (now Warrant Officer) Frank Trevor Bone.
- C4335109 Flight Sergeant Philip Ward Bratby.
- M1941171 Flight Sergeant Robert Anthony Chandler.
- X4258771 Flight Sergeant Thomas Joseph Glass.
- N1944467 Flight Sergeant Anthony John Gough.
- G1949274 Flight Sergeant Robin Malcolm Graham.
- N1927078 Flight Sergeant Michael Hallissey.
- D1807149 Flight Sergeant Richard John Hardeman.
- L1936757 Right Sergeant Alan James Hartford.
- G4195073 Flight Sergeant Norman Allen McGregor.
- B4248528 Flight Sergeant Alfred Leslie Metters.
- C2618515 Flight Sergeant Sheila Oliver West, Women's Royal Auxiliary Air Force.
- M4266303 Chief Technician James Hutton Mearns.
- Q1947251 Sergeant (now Flight Sergeant) Norman Hudson.
- F8001443 Sergeant Gerard John Hutchinson.
- H8101154 Sergeant Martin King, Royal Air Force Regiment.
- W1948082 Sergeant Michael Francis Graham Millar.
- S8111811 Sergeant Graham Arthur Pook.

Civil Division

United Kingdom

- Robert Law Allan, Driver, Giddings & Lewis Fraser Ltd., Arbroath.
- Raymond Peter Armitage, Chargehand, York, Remploy.
- Patrick Joseph Arnold, Senior Road Inspector, Wandle District, London Buses Ltd.
- Albert Edward Artell, Operative, Chester Treatment Works.
- Robert William Thomas Ashkettle, lately Driver, London Underground Ltd.
- Elsie Mary Auld, Warden, Hanover Housing Association.
- Leslie Joseph Avery, Coastguard Officer 1, Department of Transport.
- George Franz Bailey, Senior Head Gardener, Commonwealth War Graves Commission.
- Arthur Reginald Baldry. For services to the community in Burnham Market
- Vincent Stanley Baldwin, Senior Operator, Water Reclamation Works, Whetstone.
- Winfred Kathleen Ball, lately Home Help, Somerset County Council.
- Henry William John Bargent, Postal Officer, Reading, The Post Office.
- Thomas Henry Barnes, Foreman, High Marnham Power Station, Midlands. Region,. Central Electricity Generating Board.
- Wendy Phyliss Dorothy Barton, Group Commandant, Girls' Venture Corps, Gloucestershire.
- Frederick James Arthur Baxter, School Staff Instructor, Ampleforth College, Combined Cadet Force.
- Robert Arthur Victor Baxter, Senior Planning Foreman, Osram (GEC) Ltd.
- Stanley Edward Phillip Bellamy. For services to agriculture, in the Isle of Wight.
- Marjorie Oldershaw Bellsham. For services to elderly and disabled people in West Cornwall.
- Frederick Benfold, lately Dust Control Officer, Manvers Colliery, South Yorkshire Area, National Coal Board.
- Robert Martin Bennett, Co-ordinating Supervisor, Mersey Docks and Harbour Company.
- Dennis Joseph Birch, Garage Supervisor, British Broadcasting Corporation.
- Joseph Samuel Bloomfield, lately Superintendent of the Attendant Cleaners, Westminster Abbey.
- Thomas Basil Boam, Laboratory Superintendent, Department of Botany, University of Sheffield.
- Edgar Bottomley, Toolroom Manager, N.S.F. Ltd.
- Jean Miller Boyd, Senior Pharmacy Technician, Royal Alexandra Infirmary, Paisley.
- Adeline Olive Brautigam, Organiser, Hounslow, Women's Royal Voluntary Service.
- Peter Broadbent, Service Engineer, North Eastern Region, British Gas Corporation.
- Douglas George Brown, Verger, St. Margaret's Church, Rosyth.
- Margaret Brown, Inspector-Government Contracts, Crabtree Electrical Industries Ltd.
- Reginald James Browning, Joiner, Vosper Thorneycroft (UK) Ltd.
- Albert Edward Brunt, Toastmaster, Birmingham.
- Robert Victor Denis Bunworth, Office Keeper IA, Department of Trade and Industry.
- Eric Raymond Alfred Busby, Retained Sub Officer, Kent Fire Brigade.
- Kenneth Martin Butler, Instructional Officer II, Ministry of Defence.
- Mary Elizabeth Rosina Carter, Observer, No. 10 Group, Truro, Royal Observer Corps.
- Paul Anthony Cash, Driver, Ministry of Defence.
- Frederick Bryan Caunter, Service Engineer, South Western Region, British Gas Corporation.
- Hettie Winifred Chandler. For services to the community, particularly the British Heart Foundation, in Southwark.
- John Joseph Coffey, Security Officer III, HM Treasury.
- Patrick Connolly, Steward, Royal Blackheath Golf Club.
- James Cooper, Sergeant Major Instructor (Drum Major), Angus and Dundee Battalion, Army Cadet Force.
- Ronald Cooper, lately Dieshell Machinist, Engineering Department, Lever Brothers Ltd.
- Stanley Cooper. For services to the community in Sheffield.
- Gwenthlian Anne Cox, Assistant Manager, Yateley Industries (Sheltered Workshop).
- James Ernest Crane, Secretary, The Hertfordshire Regiment, Old Comrades Association
- Peter Allen Cripps, Constable, Norfolk Constabulary.
- Frank James Crouch, Carpenter, Foreign and Commonwealth Office.
- Frederick Charles Crowson. For services to the community in Barnack, Cambridgeshire.
- Roy Cunningham, Welder, Ministry of Defence.
- Julian Angus Darlaston, Works Superintendent, Leicester City Council.
- Gwenllian Margaret Davies. For services to the community in West Glamorgan.
- Laura Maria Davies. For services to the Guild of Community Service, Plymouth.
- Roworth Herbert Dearing, General Foreman, Shoreham Port Authority.
- Stanley Dernie, Foreman Joiner, Leverton & Brown Ltd.
- Edward William Frederick Dodd, Chief Photoprinter, Ministry of Defence.
- Derek Stanley Doman. For services to youth in Sheffield.
- Thomas Gerard Donaghy, lately Chief Works Officer Class II, HM Prison Perth.
- Ernest Robert Donald, School Bus Driver, Franklin Delano Roosevelt School, Inner London Education Authority.
- Edgar Henry Dyson, Constable, Metropolitan Police.
- George Alfred Edenborough, Senior Fire Control Operator, Hereford and Worcester Fire Brigade.
- Keith Alfred Ellis, Sergeant, South Yorkshire Police.
- David Winston Evans, Coxswain, New Quay (Dyfed) Lifeboat, Royal National Lifeboat Institution.
- John Starling Farr. For services to the Scout Association in London.
- Charles John Fay, Senior Supervisor, Stanlow Refinery, Shell International.
- Robert Richard Leslie Filby, lately Boatswain in Command, Ministry of Defence.
- Brian Alfred Fisher, Chargehand, Avonmouth Terminal, Shell International.
- Ernest dark Fowler, Chargehand Fitter, Home Office.
- Margus Fitzroy Fowles, Hedge-layer, Bridgnorth, Shropshire.
- Kathleen Frankish, lately Supervisor of Cleaners, Ministry of Agriculture, Fisheries and Food.
- Elizabeth Caroline Garrett, lately Security Officer IV, Home Office.
- Geoffrey Ernest Gates, Inspector, Technical Products Area, Plessey Connectors Ltd.
- Venizelos Georgiou, lately messenger, Foreign and Commonwealth Office.
- Charles Edmund Gill, Process and General Supervisory Class D, Department of Trade and Industry.
- John Givans, Ambulance Officer, Southern Health and Social Services Board, Northern Ireland.
- Daniel McLaughan Gorman, Process and General Supervisory E, Ministry of Defence.
- Harry Goudge, Surveyor Higher Grade, Department of the Environment.
- Ian George Gray, Fire Inspector, Scottish Region, British Railways.
- John Gray, Maintenance Supervisor, Century Newspapers Ltd.
- Alan Leonard Greaves, Senior Project Test Engineer, Hatfield/Lostock Division, Dynamics Group, British Aerospace plc.
- Joseph Greig, Sub Officer West Yorkshire Fire Service.
- William Alexander Grieve, Farmer, Island of Rousay, Orkney.
- James Handley Hair, Leader, Rotary Boys' Club, Dumfries.
- Frederick George Hall, Attendant, Brighton Power Station, South Eastern Area, Central Electricity Generating Board.
- Arthur James Hancock, Head Gardener, Powis Castle, The National Trust.
- The Reverend William Charles Harrap, First Aid Advisory Officer, British Telecommunications plc.
- Allan Webster Hay, lately Head Warder, National Galleries of Scotland, Scottish Education Department.
- Daisy Minnie Head. For services to the St. John Ambulance Association in Berkshire.
- Bertram Arthur Hemming, Member, Ipswich Branch, Royal Naval Association.
- Michael John Hickey, Leading Watchman and Shift Leader, University of London.
- Robert James Bayfield Hickling, Basic Breeding Manager, Cherry Valley Farms Ltd.
- Eric George Hicks, Mobile Drive/Chargehand, RAF Coltishall, Navy, Army and Air Force Institutes.
- Sydney Hill, lately Foreman, Central Meter Testing Station, East Midlands Electricity Board.
- Douglas Morton Herd. For services to youth in Shaw Cross, West Yorkshire.
- Andrew Robertson Hogg, lately Head Foreman, Welding Shop, Brown Brothers & Company Ltd., Edinburgh.
- Clarence Christopher Holmes, Labourer Chargehand, Ministry of Defence.
- Robert Horn, lately Inspector, Ribble Motor Services Ltd.
- Edward Albert Huckle, Fireman, London Fire Brigade.
- Alan John Hurved, Constable, Metropolitan Police.
- John Mackenzie Mathieson Jack, Coxswain, Broughty Ferry Lifeboat, Royal National Lifeboat Institution.
- Inglis Crawford Jameson, Foreman, Ferranti plc, Scotland.
- William John Jenkins, Farm Manager, Carmarthen Technical and Agricultural College Farm.
- Donald Arthur Jessup, Hospital Chief Officer II, HM Prison Birmingham.
- Eric Arthur Johnson, DFC, AFC, Chief Observer, No. 16 Group, Shrewsbury, Royal Observer Corps.
- Winifred Johnson, Chief Officer II, HM Prison Askham Grange.
- Albert Raymond Jones, Detective Sergeant, Ministry of Defence Police.
- Walter Jones, Postal Executive D, Crewe Head Office, Midlands Postal Board, The Post Office.
- William Caradog Jones, Head Bailiff, Lower Teifi Area, Welsh Water Authority.
- Albert Ronald George Jordan, Professional and Technology Officer III, Ministry of Defence.
- Franciszek Zygmunt Kantowski, Traffic Warden Co-ordinator, Nottinghamshire Constabulary.
- William Kendall, Pattern Maker, Sloan & Davidson Ltd.
- George Penman Kerr, Foreman, Department of the Environment.
- Brian Victor King, Constable, Port of London Authority.
- Thomas King, Senior Automatic Tool Setter, Hypertac Ltd.
- Nora Landon, Secretary, King George VI Memorial Club, Stoke-on-Trent.
- Kenneth Gordon Lane, lately Professional and Technology Officer III, Commonwealth War Graves Commission.
- Edward Alexander Langford, Secretary, HMS Cornwall Association.
- Ronald Frederick Winston Lay, Process and General Supervisory D, Ministry of Defence.
- John Corbett McLean Leel, Foreman, Overhead Lines, North of Scotland Hydro-Electric Board.
- Albert Henry Legg, Driver, Thames Water Authority.
- Stella Alice May Leng. For services to the community in Orell, Wigan.
- Ethel Leonard. For services to the Boys Brigade in Salford.
- Eric Lloyd Linton, Milling Machine Operator, Aviation Division, Dunlop Ltd.
- John Joseph Liptrott, Development Worker, Sherwood Colliery, North Notts Area, National Coal Board.
- Peter George Luther, Chief Laboratory Technician, Department of Surgery, University College, London.
- John Samuel Lynch, Plant Attendant, Department of the Environment, Northern Ireland.
- Patrick Lynch, Supervisor, Northern Ireland Forest Service.
- Maurice James McCumisky, lately Face Chargeman, Birch Coppice Colliery, South Midlands Area, National Coal Board.
- James Munro MacLeod, Permanent Way Supervisor, Scottish Region, British Railways.
- Robert McMullan, Clerk of Works, South East Region, Northern Ireland Housing Executive.
- Donald Macpherson. For services to piping.
- William Magill, Head Driver, Banbridge, Southern Health and Social Services Board, Northern Ireland.
- Norman Edward Marriott, Senior Messenger, Department of Health and Social Security.
- John Martin, Chargehand Mechanic, Francis Webster and Sons Ltd. Arbroath.
- Sarah Meek, Senior Citizens Warden, Doncaster Metropolitan Borough Council.
- John Howard Millington, Sergeant, Cheshire Constabulary.
- Peter Robert Mitchell, Coxswain Mechanic, Lizard Cadgwith Lifeboat, Royal National Lifeboat Institution.
- Hugh Morrison, Foreman, Finishing Department, Alex Begg & Company Ltd, Ayr.
- Winifred Amelia Mount. For services to the development of swimming in Cardiff.
- Samuel Mulholland, Caretaker, Fort Hill Girls' High School, Lisburn.
- Cecil Gilbert Richard Murdoch, Chief Officer II, Northern Ireland Prison Service.
- William Charles New, lately Deputy County Director, Suffolk Division, St. John Ambulance Brigade.
- Stanley Newton, Head Porter, Bradford Royal Infirmary.
- Thomas Leslie Nickson, Chief Observer, No. 21 Group, Preston, Royal Observer Corps.
- Margaret Noble, Secretary, Friends of Woodlands Hospital, Aberdeen.
- Ronald Arthur George Noble, lately Head, Valve Test Laboratory, GEC Transmission and Distribution Projects Ltd.
- Herbert Harvey John Nunns. For services to the Ex-Services Mental Welfare Society.
- Nesta Mairwen Owen. For services to the community in Liverpool.
- Thomas Parry, Fireman, Risley, United Kingdom Atomic Energy Authority.
- Alfred John Payne, Chief Inspector and Safety Officer, Berry Magicoal Ltd.
- Herbert Alan Perkins, Customer Accounts Officer, East Midlands Region, British Gas Corporation.
- Constance Phillips, Assistant to Subpostmaster, Belgrave Sub Post Office, Orpington.
- Reginald David Pitcher, Professional and Technology Officer III, Ministry of Defence.
- Patricia Jean Powter, Hospital Car Service Organiser, Avon, Women's Royal Voluntary Service.
- Derek Preece, Sergeant, Warwickshire Constabulary.
- Mabel Pulham. For services to Maudsley and East Dulwich Hospitals.
- Florence Elizabeth Raymond. For services to the community in London E.2.
- Stanley Richardson, Works Supervisor, South Yorkshire Metropolitan County Council.
- Barbara Jessie Richmond, lately Officer in Charge Children's Home, London Borough of Hammersmith.
- Edward John Roberts, Overman, Point of Ayr Colliery, Western Area, National Coal Board.
- Jean Marie Scott Robinson, Centre Organiser, Bakewell Division, British Red Cross Society.
- James Arthur Rodgers, Sergeant, Essex Police.
- James Thomas Cook Rose, Retained Sub-Officer, Central Region Fire Brigade.
- Hazel Elizabeth Rowlands. For services to the dairy industry in Wales.
- George William Russell, Craftsman, Dussek Campbell Ltd.
- Roy Ernest Scarr, Foreman, Premier Travel Ltd.
- Kenneth Seed, Ventilation Officer, Wearmouth Colliery, North East Area, National Coal Board.
- Brian Arthur Sharp, Sergeant, West Midlands Police.
- Gordon William Shepherd. For services to the Royal British Legion.
- Derek Alan Sibbet, Chargehand, Culham, United Kingdom Atomic Energy Authority.
- William John Skates, Process and General Supervisory C, Ministry of Defence.
- James Desmond Skillen, Officer, Northern Ireland Prison Service.
- Charles Smith, Depot Manager, Dron & Dickson Ltd, Dunblane.
- Ronald Herbert Smith, Foreman, South Western Electricity Board.
- Royston Albert Smith, Driver, Western Region, British Railways.
- Gilbert Smulders, Constable, Merseyside Police.
- Ethel Dorothy Speller, School Crossing Patrol, Metropolitan Police.
- Keir Edward Spence, Constable, Fife Constabulary.
- Norman Kenneth Steward, Driver, Eastern Region, British Railways.
- Isabella McGregor Stewart. For services to Scottish folk music.
- Joseph Harold Stockton, Retained Leading Fireman, Lincolnshire Fire Brigade.
- David Stott, Janitor, Andover Primary School, Brechin.
- Peter Derek Streatfield, lately Senior Photographer, Central Office of Information.
- James Harpur Sullivan, Sergeant, Metropolitan Police.
- David Victor Swain, Head Attendant, Ulster Folk and Transport Museum.
- Robert Love Swinton, Duty Apron Services Supervisor, Edinburgh Airport.
- Lily Emley Tallis, lately Employee, Birmingham, Remploy.
- Connie Thomas, Home Help, Shropshire County Council.
- George James Thompson, Foreman, Belfast City Council.
- Robert Thompson, lately Head Gardener, Northumbria Police.
- Joseph John Trabucchi, Superintendent, Norwich Division, Anglian Water Authority.
- Doris Phoebe Travis, District Organiser, Newport, Women's Royal Voluntary Service.
- Ronald Henry Tunnell, Stores Officer Grade C, Ministry of Defence.
- Peter Vine, lately Technical Officer, London Region, British Telecommunications plc.
- Helen Wakeman, lately Divisional Secretary and Caseworker, Gloucester Division, Soldiers', Sailors' and Airmen's Families Association.
- Edward Watt, Foreman, Springfields Works, British Nuclear Fuels plc.
- George Watt, Farm Manager and Overseer, Gargunnock Estate, Stirlingshire.
- John Weatherup, Driver, Northern Ireland Railways Company Ltd.
- Eric Rowles Webb, Foreman, Civil Division, Aircraft Group, British Aerospace plc.
- Edith Webster, Foster Parent, Cumbria Social Services Department.
- Alfred Dale Wedgwood, Auxiliary Coastguard in Charge, Robin Hoods Bay, Cleveland.
- Brian Westmoreland, Constable, West Yorkshire Metropolitan Police.
- Frederick Wheatley, Floor Roller, Coil Plate Mill, Lackenby Works, BSC Sections and Commercial Steels.
- Norman Edwin Whenmouth, Senior Instructor, Training Centre, Lucas CAV Ltd.
- Ronald Whitby, Section Leader, Production Engineering, Warton Division, Aircraft Group, British Aerospace plc.
- Patricia Mary Wilding, Transport Organiser, Shropshire, Women's Royal Voluntary Service.
- John Frederick Williams, Fitter Inspector, Rolls-Royce Ltd.
- Francis James Willmott, lately Toolroom Superintendent, Precision Grinding Ltd.
- Robert Burgess Wilson, Production Manager, Lower Holme Mills, British Mohair Spinners Ltd.
- Arthur Joseph Wiseman, Auxiliary Officer, HM Prison Norwich.
- Joan Mavis Wollerton, Hospitals Organiser, Lincolnshire, Women's Royal Voluntary Service.
- Norman John Francis Wright, Process and General Supervisory B, Ministry of Defence.

Overseas Territories

- Maribel Arias, Personal Secretary to the Chief Minister, Gibraltar.
- Chiu Man-wah, Senior Clerical Officer, General Clerical Service, Hong Kong.
- Thomas Vincent Finlayson, Senior Messenger, Governor's Office, Gibraltar.
- Foo Sau-pak, Clerical Officer II, General Clerical Service, Hong Kong.
- Kwong Yew, Senior Coxswain, Marine Department, Hong Kong.
- Kenneth John Leo, Station Sergeant, St. Helena Police Force.
- Leung. Yun-wing, Superintendent of Posts, General Post Office, Hong Kong.
- Mak Yung-lok, Section Leader Grade SIII, Civil Aid Services, Hong Kong.
- Sylvia Lillian McGugan, Senior Confidential Assistant, Police Department, Hong Kong.
- Wong Yan-park, Senior Clerical Officer, Factory Inspectorate Division, Hong Kong.
- Yip Lam, Chief Customs Officer, Customs and Excise Service, Hong Kong.

Australian States

State of Queensland

- Leonard Aubrey Barsby. For services to the community.
- Thomas John Bethel. For services to the community.
- Marjory Kathleen Brown. For services to war widows.
- Terence Gregory Channells, Superintendent, Queensland Police Force.
- Elizabeth Daniels. For services to the community.
- Wallace Septimus Escott. For services to the community.
- Councillor Thomas Wesley Gee. For services to local government and to the sugar industry.
- Hazel May Larard. For services to the community and to disabled people.
- Joanna Lee. For services to the community.
- Ronald Frank Schmidt. For services to the community.
- Robert James Wilson. For services to the community.

State of Tasmania

- Kevin Charles Haas. For services to the community.
- Ernest Albert McGlade. For services to the community.
- Geoffrey Bernard Martin. For services to the community.

=== Royal Red Cross (RRC) ===
Members of the Royal Red Cross, First Class

- Major Cherry Picton Duncan, TD, (474107), Queen Alexandra's Royal Army Nursing Corps, Territorial Army.
- Major Stella Mary Fitzpatrick (471111), Queen Alexandra's Royal Army Nursing Corps.

==== Associate of the Royal Red Cross (ARRC) ====
- Superintending Nursing Officer Jane Titley, Queen Alexandra's Royal Naval Nursing Service.
- Captain Jennifer Margaret Heron (505521), Queen Alexandra's Royal Army Nursing Corps.
- Major Elizabeth Woods, TD, (493079), Queen Alexandra's Royal Army Nursing Corps, Territorial Army.
- Squadron Leader Maureen Elizabeth White (408920), Princess Mary's Royal Air Force Nursing Service.

=== Air Force Cross (AFC) ===
Royal Navy

- Lieutenant Commander Douglas Hamilton.
- Commander Denis John Thornton.

Army

- Major Ian Louis Cornall (496576), Army Air Corps.
- 24039641 Warrant Officer Class 2 Graham Laverton, Army Air Corps.

Royal Air Force

- Wing Commander Andrew James Griffin (608532).
- Squadron Leader Angus Balfour Crockatt (8020814).
- Flight Lieutenant David Handel Humphreys-Evans (4231291).

=== Air Force Medal (AFM) ===
- 24012859 Staff Sergeant Robert Waters Hart Glonek, Army Air Corps.

=== Queen's Police Medal (QPM) ===
England and Wales

- Hugh Norman Annesley, Assistant Commissioner, Metropolitan Police.
- Christopher William Atkins, Assistant Chief Constable, Surrey Constabulary.
- Patrick James Carson, Commander, Metropolitan Police.
- Ivan Noel Forder, lately Deputy Chief Constable, Northamptonshire Police.
- Colin Glover, Chief Superintendent, West Mercia Constabulary.
- Edward Griffith, Assistant Chief Constable, Nottinghamshire Constabulary.
- William Grundy, Chief Superintendent, Durham Constabulary.
- Algernon Walter Firth Hemmingway, Commander, Metropolitan Police.
- Anthony Harold Hill, Detective, Chief Superintendent, Hertfordshire Constabulary.
- Anthony Charles Mills, Chief Superintendent, HM Inspectorate of Constabulary.
- Peter John Nobes, Chief Constable, North Yorkshire Police.
- Leslie Sharp, Deputy Chief Constable, West Midlands Police.
- John Alfred Smith, Deputy Assistant Commissioner, Metropolitan Police.
- Joseph George Symon, Chief Superintendent, Merseyside Police.
- John Thorburn, Chief Superintendent, Greater Manchester Police.

Scotland

- Hugh Ward Clannachan MacMillan, Chief Constable, Northern Constabulary.
- James Alistair Hood, Lothian and Borders Police, Assistant Chief Constable/Deputy Commandant, Scottish Police College.

Northern Ireland

- William Johnston McAllister, Senior Assistant Chief Constable, Royal Ulster Constabulary.
- William Kenneth Reid, Detective, Chief Superintendent, Royal Ulster Constabulary.

Hong Kong

- Chan Tai-Wing, CPM, Deputy Commandant, Royal Hong Kong Auxiliary Police Force.
- Victor Maurice Green, CPM, Chief Superintendent, Royal Hong Kong Police Force.

Barbados

- Michael Hampson Baugh, LVO, Regional Police Adviser, Barbados.

Australian States

State of Queensland

- Albert Thomas Pointing, Superintendent, Queensland Police Force.

State of Tasmania

- Anthony John Power, Sergeant, Tasmania Police Force.

=== Queen's Fire Services Medal (QFSM) ===
England and Wales

- Trevor Bassett, Chief Officer, Dorset Fire Brigade.
- Christopher Valentine Evans, Divisional Officer II, Nottinghamshire Fire Service.
- Albert Richard Kennedy, Assistant Chief Officer, London Fire Brigade.
- William James Mackenzie, Deputy Chief Officer, Hertfordshire Fire Brigade.
- Kenneth Trott, Chief Fire Prevention Officer, Navy Department Fire Prevention Service.
- Albert Leslie Wills, Assistant Chief Officer, West Midlands Fire Service.

=== Colonial Police Medal (CPM) ===
- Gwynfor Victor Allaway, Senior Divisional Officer, Hong Kong Fire Services.
- Mathew Ratcliff Atkinson, Chief Inspector, Royal Hong Kong Police Force.
- John Neville Broomfield, Senior Superintendent, Royal Hong Kong Police Force.
- Chan Siu-ha, Woman Station Sergeant, Royal Hong Kong Police Force.
- Cheng Fook-hong, Superintendent, Royal Hong Kong Police Force.
- Evan Hopkin Evans, Senior Superintendent, Royal Hong Kong Police Force.
- Ho Hing-chuen, Station Sergeant, Royal Hong Kong Police Force.
- James Godfrey Hurst, Senior Superintendent, Royal Hong Kong Police Force.
- Phillip Layton, Superintendent, Royal Hong Kong Police Force.
- Leung Cho, Station Sergeant, Royal Hong Kong Police Force.
- Leung Fook-chu, Principal Fireman, Hong Kong Fire Services.
- Leung Ka, Sergeant, Royal Hong Kong Police Force.
- Lo Man-tui, Station Sergeant, Royal Hong Kong Police Force.
- Eric John Lockeyear, Senior Superintendent, Royal Hong Kong Police Force.
- Russell John Mason, Senior Superintendent, Royal Hong Kong Police Force.
- James Francis Morris, Superintendent, Royal Hong Kong Police Force.
- George Alexander Adams Murphy, Senior Superintendent, Royal Hong Kong Police Force.
- Ng On-heung, Principal Fireman, Hong Kong Fire Services.
- Pao Wai-ling, Station Sergeant, Royal Hong Kong Police Force.
- Wong Har-chung, Senior Fireman, Hong Kong Fire Services.

=== Queen's Commendation for Valuable Service in the Air ===
Royal Navy

- Lieutenant Commander Geoffrey Albert Andrews.

Army

- 23849746 Warrant Officer Class 1 Jack Robson, Army Air Corps.

Royal Air Force

- Squadron Leader John Kitleigh Llewellyn Babraff (4233496).
- Squadron Leader Anthony Edward Ian McGregor (4232404).
- Squadron Leader Ian Robert McLuskie, (4233404).
- Squadron Leader Derek Peter Edmund Straw (4231369).
- Squadron Leader Alfred George Woolfrey (2507418).
- Flight Lieutenant Peter James Collins (5202140).
- Flight Lieutenant Jeffrey William Glover (5202125).
- Flight Lieutenant Paul Anthony Spears (8025346).
- Master Air Loadmaster Peter Robin Goddard (X0683959).
- Master Air Loadmaster Francis Joseph Hughes (K4269451).
- Major Robert McPherson Auld (431083021), Canadian Armed Forces.

United Kingdom

- John Patrick Kelly, Boeing 747 Fleet Manager, British Caledonian Airways.

== Mauritius ==
=== Knight Bachelor ===
- Abdool Hamid Adam Moollan, QC. For services to the legal profession.

=== Order of Saint Michael and Saint George ===
==== Companion of the Order of St Michael and St George (CMG) ====
- Yon Von Lai Fat Fur. For services to commerce and industry.

=== Order of the British Empire ===
==== Commander of the Order of the British Empire (CBE) ====
Civil Division

- Marie Corneille Louis Gustave Paten. For services to aviation and tourism.

==== Officer of the Order of the British Empire (OBE) ====
Civil Division

- Jean Marcel Domingue. For services to education.
- Joseph Denis Max Henry, lately, Commissioner of Income Tax.
- Rampaul Ruhee. For services to sport.

==== Member of the Order of the British Empire (MBE) ====
Civil Division

- Rashid Korimbocus. For voluntary social work.
- Raphael Freddy Malecaut. For services to monumental art.
- Louis Francis On Seng. For services to civil aviation.
- Barvateebye Pandoo. For voluntary social work.
- Mahaboob Peerbocus. For voluntary social work.
- Raj Buns Pulton, lately, Commissioner, Regional Development Unit, Ministry of Economic Planning and Development.
- Retnon Velvindron. For voluntary social work.
- Jean Serge Zephyr. For voluntary social work.

=== Companion of the Imperial Service Order (ISO) ===
- Louis Maxime Labour, lately Administrative Secretary, Rodrigues.

=== Mauritius Police Medal ===
- Pierre Clovis Athow, lately, Chief Inspector, Mauritius Police Force.
- Haroon Alrashid Cotobally, Chief Inspector, Mauritius Police Force.
- Guy Francois Xavier Lubin, lately, Superintendent, Mauritius Police Force.
- Georgy James Rathbone, Constable, Mauritius Police Force.

== Fiji ==
=== Order of the British Empire ===
==== Knight Commander of the Order of the British Empire (KBE) ====
Civil Division

- Ratu Josaia Tavaiqia, OBE, Minister of State for Forests.
- Leonard Gray Usher, CBE. For public service.

==== Commander of the Order of the British Empire (CBE) ====
Civil Division

- Dr. Isireli Qala Lasaqa. For public service.

==== Officer of the Order of the British Empire (OBE) ====
Civil Division

- Livai Labaloto Nasilivata, MC, Minister of State for Co-operatives.
- Kanti Lai Tappoo. For services to the community.

==== Member of the Order of the British Empire (MBE) ====
Military Division

- Major Vatiliai Navunisaravi, Acting Commanding Officer, 3rd Battalion, Fiji Infantry Regiment.

Civil Division

- Herbert Thomas Gatward. For services to the dairy industry and to the community.
- Ratu Meli Loki. For services to community development.
- Malka Shah. For voluntary service.
- Surjan Singh. For services to the community.

== Bahamas ==
=== Order of the British Empire ===
==== Officer of the Order of the British Empire (OBE) ====
Civil Division

- Bertram Augustus Cambridge. For services to the community and to music.

==== Member of the Order of the British Empire (MBE) ====
Civil Division

- Shonell Laverne Ferguson. For services to sport.
- Doris Enid Tinker. For services to the community.

== Grenada ==
=== Knight Bachelor ===
- Hudson Rupert Scipio, Speaker of the House of Representatives.

=== Order of the British Empire ===
==== Officer of the Order of the British Empire (OBE) ====
Civil Division

- Rupert Richard Japal. For services to the community.
- Lyle Kevin St Paul, Senior Magistrate.

==== Member of the Order of the British Empire (MBE) ====
Civil Division

- Simon Charles, Secretary General, Grenada Red Cross.
- Randolph Mark. For public service.

=== British Empire Medal (BEM) ===
Civil Division

- May Nurse. For services to education and to the community.
- Theresa Simeon. For services to sport and the community.

== Papua New Guinea ==
=== Knight Bachelor ===
- Paulias Nguna Matane, CMG, OBE. For public service.

=== Order of Saint Michael and Saint George ===
==== Companion of the Order of St Michael and St George (CMG) ====
- Andrew Moriwen Douglas Yauieb. For public service.

=== Order of the British Empire ===
==== Commander of the Order of the British Empire (CBE) ====
Civil Division

- Brian Kupanarigo Amini. For public service.
- Gavera Rea. For political and community services.
- David Dorkou Tasion, QPM, Commissioner, Royal Papua New Guinea Constabulary.

==== Officer of the Order of the British Empire (OBE) ====
Military Division

- Colonel John Sanawe (83030), Papua New Guinea Defence Force.

Civil Division

- Kaki Paulus Angi. For services to local and provincial government.
- Francis Bernard Borok. For public service.
- Ila Geno, QPM, Deputy Commissioner, Royal Papua New Guinea Constabulary.
- Donald Sigitom Sigamata. For public service.
- Peter Wan. For services to the community.

==== Member of the Order of the British Empire (MBE) ====
Military Division

- Lieutenant Colonel John Bure Koaba (82246), Papua New Guinea Defence Force.

Civil Division

- Leith Reinsford Steven Anderson. For public and community service.
- Sergeant Major Lapakei Bauri (2336), Royal Papua New Guinea Constabulary.
- Sergeant Major Moses Bowi (3395), Royal Papua New Guinea Constabulary.
- Graeme William Dunnage. For services to the community.
- Dr. James Sammuel Ferguson. For services to health education and to the community.
- Sister Claire Kadiesany. For services to the Cheshire Homes.
- Amugl Kuglame. For public and community services.
- Margarette Catherine Auhaue Loko. For services to women and youth.
- Regina Albira MacKenzie. For services to the community.
- Harold Geoffrey McLaughlin. For services to civil aviation.
- Momba Omba. For services to local government.
- Senior Correctional Officer Robin Polis (CIP 126), Papua New Guinea Corrective Institutions Service.
- David Gordon Fremoult Pringuer. For public service.
- Koyle Siwi. For services to local government.
- James Alexander Taylor. For community and public services.

=== Companion of the Imperial Service Order (ISO) ===
- John Boe Parker. For public service.

=== British Empire Medal (BEM) ===
Military Division

- Sergeant Joseph Maune (82858), Papua New Guinea Defence Force.
- Provisional CWO Tako Pairop (82707), Papua New Guinea Defence Force.
- Provisional CWO Masil Seming (84593), Papua New Guinea Defence Force.

Civil Division

- Benjamin Damunggo. For public service.
- Senior Sergeant Anton Hambindua (3224), Royal Papua New Guinea Constabulary.
- Sergeant Poipo Kurup, Royal Papua New Guinea Constabulary.
- Robert Kuvura. For public service.
- Neng Oi. For public service.
- Mauri Mala Ovia. For public service.
- Senior Assistant Correctional Officer Parairova Tokavataria (0469), Papua New Guinea Corrective Institutions Services.
- Henry Kolias Wartovo. For public service.

=== Queen's Police Medal (QPM) ===
- Roy Tiden, Chief Superintendent, Papua New Guinea Police Force.
- Paul Tohian, Assistant Commissioner, Papua New Guinea Police Force.

== Solomon Islands ==
=== Order of Saint Michael and Saint George ===
==== Companion of the Order of St Michael and St George (CMG) ====
- Daniel Maeke, OBE, Ombudsman of Solomon Islands.

=== Order of the British Empire ===
==== Commander of the Order of the British Empire (CBE) ====
Civil Division

- Robert Kingston Finnimore. For public service.

==== Officer of the Order of the British Empire (OBE) ====
Civil Division

- Sister Ethel Mary Cuff. For services to the community.

==== Member of the Order of the British Empire (MBE) ====
Civil Division

- The Reverend George Basile. For services to the community.
- Brother Leonard Sydenham, SM. For services to community development.

=== British Empire Medal (BEM) ===
Civil Division

- Rimu Baizovaki. For services to the community.
- Willie Apusai Bei. For services to the community.
- Luke Maneka. For services to the community.
- Peter Panahite. For public service.
- Timothy Zuidana. For public service.

== St. Lucia ==
=== Order of the British Empire ===
==== Officer of the Order of the British Empire (OBE) ====
Civil Division

- Emmanuel Henry Giraudy. For services to the community.

==== Member of the Order of the British Empire (MBE) ====
Civil Division

- Luna Marie Blanchard. For services to the community in the field of public health.
- The Reverend Sister Veronica Condron. For services to the community and to education.

=== British Empire Medal (BEM) ===
Civil Division

- Edna Dembo. For services to the community and to education.
- Augustus Guiplette. For services to the community and to forest preservation.
- Maria Clerorua Joseph. For services to the community.
- Juliis Williams. For services to the community in the field of agriculture.

== St. Vincent & Grenadines ==
=== Order of the British Empire ===
==== Officer of the Order of the British Empire (OBE) ====
Civil Division

- Arthur Connell. For services to the community.
- Beryl Richards, lately Postmaster General.

==== Member of the Order of the British Empire (MBE) ====
Civil Division

- Grace Mildred Estina Dublin. For services to the community.

== Belize ==
=== Knight Bachelor ===
- Henry Edney Conrad Cain. For public service.

=== Order of the British Empire ===
==== Commander of the Order of the British Empire (CBE) ====
Civil Division

- Michael John Hulse, CVO, OBE, Deputy Financial Secretary and Permanent Secretary, Ministry of Defence.

==== Officer of the Order of the British Empire (OBE) ====
Civil Division

- Wiliam Henry Bowman, Executive Director, Citrus Company of Belize Ltd.
- Philip Simon Samuels Jr., Government Printer.

==== Member of the Order of the British Empire (MBE) ====
Civil Division

- Delsyia Goff. For services to nursing.
- Kent Albert Haylock, Senior Superintendent, Belize Police Force.

== Antigua & Barbuda ==
=== Order of the British Empire ===
==== Member of the Order of the British Empire (MBE) ====
Civil Division

- Ludolph Clement Brown, Accountant General.
- Ronald Irvin Ewart Michael, Director of Audit.

== St. Christopher & Nevis ==
=== Order of Saint Michael and Saint George ===
==== Companion of the Order of St Michael and St George (CMG) ====
- Dr. William Valentine Herbert. For public service.

=== Order of the British Empire ===
==== Member of the Order of the British Empire (MBE) ====
Civil Division

- Roy Arthur Anslyn. For services to the community.
