= Ronald Norman =

Ronald Norman may refer to:

- Ronald Collet Norman (1873–1963), British banker, administrator and politician
- Sir Ronald Norman (businessman) (born 1937), British businessman and author
