= John Steeds =

John Steeds may refer to:

- John Steeds (rugby union) (1916–2009), English rugby union player
- John Steeds (scientist) (born 1940), British physicist and materials scientist
