= Barry Cecil Beech Mole =

British civil engineer

Barry Cecil Beech Mole MBE (20 September 1927 – 24 November 1999) was a British civil engineer.

Beech Mole was awarded an MBE in the 1986 New Year Honours. His previous positions included deputy borough engineer for Abingdon Council, at Chipping Sodbury, and for Aldridge Urban District Council.
