= Dron =

Dron may refer to:

- Dron (Gir Gadhada), village in India
- Dron, Perth and Kinross, settlement in the United Kingdom
- Dron (surname), surname
