= Margaret MacDonald (servant) =

Nursemaid and dresser to Queen Elizabeth II

Margaret McKay MacDonald LVO RVM (1904 – 22 September 1993), known as Bobo, was a Scottish nursemaid and later dresser to Queen Elizabeth II.

== Life and career ==
MacDonald was born in 1904, the daughter of a Scottish railway worker on the Black Isle, north of Inverness.

MacDonald and her sister Ruby first entered royal service as undernurse and nursemaid, respectively, to six-week-old Princess Elizabeth of York under nanny Clara Knight. Her sister later continued to work for Princess Margaret. MacDonald was known by the nickname "Bobo", thought to be Princess Elizabeth's first word, in turn, MacDonald was one of the few people outside of the royal family who called the Queen "Lilibet". She slept in the same room as the princess for much of her childhood.

After the princess left the nursery, she remained in her employ as her dresser. Macdonald accompanied Elizabeth and the Duke of Edinburgh, the princess's husband, on their honeymoon. She was with the princess on tour in Kenya when Elizabeth received word of her accession to the throne. As her dresser, she was responsible for the Queen's clothing and jewellery. She became one of the monarch's closest confidantes.

In recognition of her service, she was made a Member, 5th Class, of the Royal Victorian Order (MVO) in the 1953 Coronation Honours. She was later promoted to a Lieutenant (LVO) in the same order in the 1986 New Year Honours. She was also awarded the Royal Victorian Medal.

MacDonald retired in her late 80s after dressing the Queen for 67 years. She never married and retained her own suite at Buckingham Palace. She died there on 22 September 1993 at the age of 89. The Queen attended her funeral which was held on 30 September 1993 at The Queen's Chapel, St James's Palace.
