= Jean Wilks =

British educator (1917–2014)

Jean Wilks CBE (1917–2014) was a headmistress at The Hertfordshire and Essex High School and King Edward VI High School for Girls. She studied at North London Collegiate School and Somerville College, Oxford, where she was later made an honorary fellow. During her career, she was a governor and adviser to the Schools' Council, sat on the Public Schools Commission, was president of the Association of Headmistresses and was the first female pro-chancellor of Birmingham University. When she retired in 1977, she was appointed CBE for services to education.

Her brother was Hector Wilks.
