= Meli Loki =

Fijian chief, businessman and politician

Member of the Senate
- In office 1979–1982

Personal details
- Died: 11 February 1987 Suva, Fiji

Ratu Meli Loki MBE (died 11 February 1987) was a Fijian chief, businessman and politician. A pioneer in the indigenous Fijian tourism industry, he served as a member of the Senate between 1979 and 1982.

== Biography ==
Loki became the chief of Tamavua, was conferred with the Roko Tui Colo title and became a member of the Great Council of Chiefs. He joined the civil service as a proofreader at the government printer in 1949. The following year he became an assistant health inspector for Suva City Council. He subsequently joined the Fijian Broadcasting Corporation, becoming its first Fijian announcer and a senior programmer, In the early 1960s he entered the tourism business, creating the Marau model village in Tamavua, where he built the largest bure in Fiji. In the early 1970s he bought a duty-free shop in the centre of Suva. He converted to the Baháʼí Faith for a period.

Entering local government, he became a member of the Suva Rual Local Authority and chairman of Naitasiri Provincial Council. He also served on the Native Land Trust Board and as a director of the Native Land Development Corporation. He contested the 1972 general elections, but failed to win a seat in the House of Representatives. In 1979 he was appointed to the Senate for a three-year term as one of the nominees of the Great Council of Chiefs. He served on several government committees, including the Prime Minister's Youth Rehabilitation Committee, the Central District committee and the Divisional Development committee. He was awarded an MBE in the 1986 New Year Honours for services to the community.

Following a stroke, he died in the Colonial War Memorial Hospital in Suva in February 1987 at the age of 55.
