= Percy Duff =

Percy Skipworth Duff MBE (1922 – 2011) was the treasurer of Kendal Borough Council from 1967, until April 1974 when he became deputy treasurer of the new South Lakeland District Council, holding the position until his retirement in 1982. He was the last surviving Honorary Citizen of Kendal, an accolade he was said to value more than his MBE.

As his son Michael Duff said at his funeral "Percy Duff was a lucky man. He was lucky to survive scarlet fever as a child; he was lucky to survive in the Western Desert in 1943 when the man standing next to him was killed by a mortar and he wasn’t; he was lucky to be happily married; he was lucky to suffer from no illness in a long life and he was lucky to live in Kendal for all that time - a place that he loved."

Percy Duff was involved in many clubs and societies some of which were:

- The Westmorland Motor Club in which he was President and who organise Motorcycle Trials and Hill Climb Racing. Percy organised the first the Barbon Hillclimb for motorcycles in 1960 and was involved in the event for 50 years; the event was latterly referred to as "The Percy Duff Barbon Hill Climb"
- The Alfred Wainwright Society Percy was articled to Alfred Wainwright, who he succeeded as treasurer of Kendal Borough Council.
- The Stephenson Locomotive Society
- Northern Centre Auto-Cycle Union where he was vice-life president.

He was appointed MBE in the 1986 New Year Honours for his voluntary work with The Mayor Of Kendal's Fund For The Aged And Infirm where his careful management over 31 years enabled the charity to improve and increase the number of affordable retirement properties.
