= Clara Knight (nanny) =

English nanny (1879–1946)

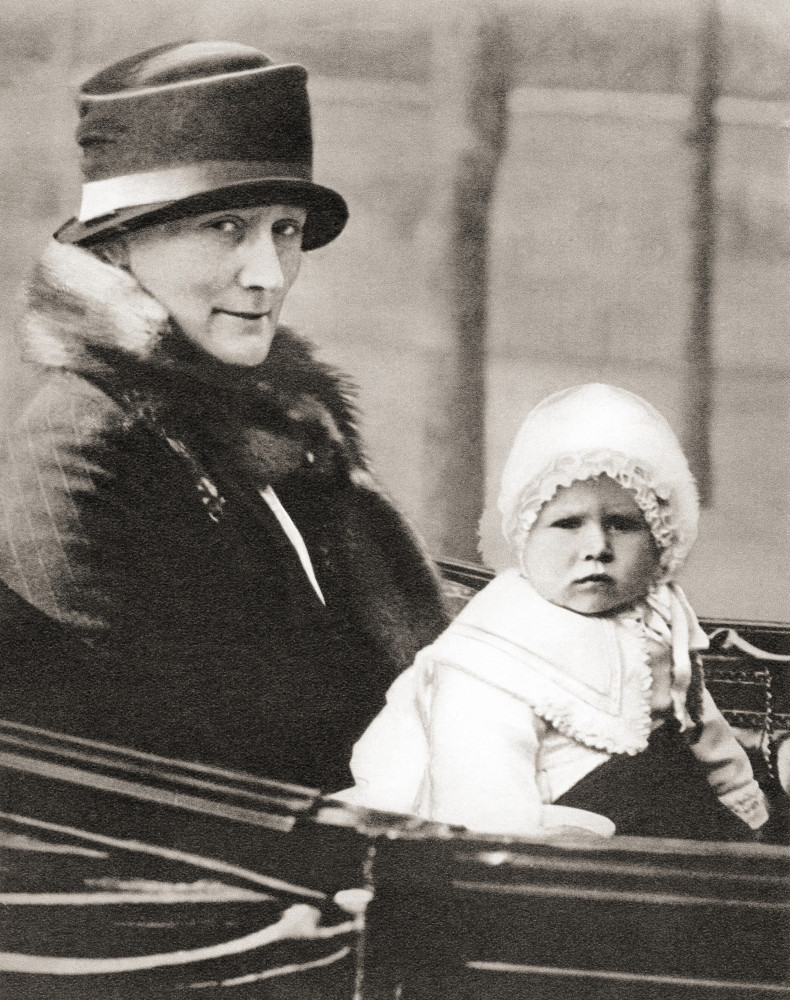
Clara Knight riding with her charge Princess Elizabeth

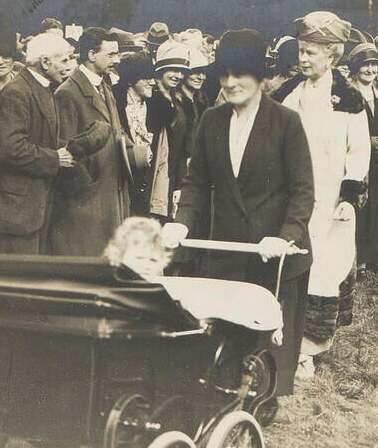
Clara Knight pushing Princess Elizabeth in a pram, 1927

Clara Cooper "Allah" Knight (1879 – 2 January 1946) was an English child caregiver and the nanny of Lady Elizabeth Bowes-Lyon (later Queen Elizabeth the Queen Mother) and of the Princesses Elizabeth of York (later Queen Elizabeth II) and Margaret of York (later Margaret, Countess of Snowdon).

== Early career ==
Knight was born near the Hertfordshire home of the Bowes-Lyon family, and was raised in a deeply Christian family. Her father was a tenant farmer from Whitwell, Hertfordshire, and her brother farmed the earl of Strathmore and Kinghorne's land at St Paul's Walden Bury.

The Bowes-Lyon family employed Knight as a nanny for their children when she was seventeen, and she spent the rest of her life raising the family's children and grandchildren. Her charges included Elizabeth and David Bowes-Lyon, children of the 14th Earl of Strathmore and Kinghorne. Because David and Elizabeth could not pronounce "Clara", they called her Allah, and the nickname stuck for the rest of her life. Knight also took charge of the children of Elizabeth and David's sister Lady Elphinstone.

== Royal service ==
Elizabeth Bowes-Lyon married Prince Albert, Duke of York, the future King George VI, in 1923, becoming known as the Duchess of York (eventually Queen Elizabeth the Queen Mother following her husband's death). When she gave birth to her first child, Princess Elizabeth, in 1926, Lady Elphinstone agreed that Knight should go and take charge of the princess. Knight moved into the York family residence at 145 Piccadilly, where she was allocated the top floor. She raised Princesses Elizabeth and Margaret until their adolescence.

Knight was a "no-nonsense" nanny who set up a rigid schedule for Princess Elizabeth lest she grow up into a spoiled adult, from breakfast at 7:30 until bedtime at 19:15. Even the princess's bowel movements were strictly regulated. Knight was aided by a more flexible, much younger nursery maid, Margaret MacDonald, while their education was entrusted to a governess, Marion Crawford. Elizabeth's companion Lady Elizabeth Cavendish described Knight as "formidable".

Nannies were expected to stay single, and Knight never married; she was referred to as "Mrs" by virtue of her senior position among the family's staff. Knight was tall and noble-looking. She was never photographed out of uniform and never talked to the press. Knight was said to have never taken a holiday, but she did take one every year. Princess Elizabeth passed on her childhood dolls to Knight, who each Christmas forwarded them to her family; among them were early Mickey and Minnie Mouse figures.

Knight was still employed by the royal family when she died at Sandringham House on 2 January 1946. Queen Elizabeth and her daughters attended Knight's funeral at St Paul's Walden. Knight's collection of dolls and clothes worn by her royal charges remained in her family until it was auctioned in 2017.
