= Dron (surname) =

Dron is a surname. Notable people with the surname include:

- Boris Dron (born 1988), Belgian racing cyclist
- Dumitru Dron (1893–1977), Moldovan politician
- Gaston Dron (1924–2008), French cyclist
- Murray Dron (born 1975), British journalist and TV presenter
- Petr Dron (born 1985), Russian curler
- Robert Wilson Dron (1869–1932), Scottish geologist and mining engineer
- Sever Dron (born 1944), Romanian tennis player and coach
- Tony Dron (1946–2021), British racing driver, author and journalist
- Alexander Dron Stewart (1883–1969), Scottish physician

== See also ==
- Dron (Gir Gadhada), an Indian village
- Dron & Dickson, a British business
