= Robert Benbow =

British Army general (1933–2014)

Major General Robert Benbow CB (4 January 1933 – 9 January 2014) was a British Army general officer.

The son of a soldier also called Robert Benbow, and his wife Blanche Augusta Norris, he was born in Secunderabad, Hyderabad, a princely state which was not part of British India. He graduated from the Royal Military Academy Sandhurst and on 31 July 1953 was commissioned into the Royal Corps of Signals. He was promoted to Lieutenant on 31 July 1955 Captain on 31 July 1959, Major on 31 July 1966, Lt. Colonel on 31 December 1972, and full Colonel on 30 June 1977. When promoted to Brigadier in December 1978, he was described as "late R. Signals".

From 1978 to 1980, Benbow was Commandant of the School of Signals. In 1983, he was promoted to Major General and was appointed as Colonel Commandant of the Royal Corps of Signals and Signal-Officer-in-Chief, serving in this post until December 1985. From that month until April 1987, he was President of the Regular Commissions Board. He then retired.

Benbow died on 9 January 2014, aged 81, in Dorchester, Dorset.

== Honours ==
In the 1986 New Year Honours, Benbow was appointed a Companion of the Order of the Bath.

Benbow was the Honorary Colonel of the Queen's Gurkha Signals.
