= Stanley Odell =

British political leader (1929–2021)

Sir Stanley Odell
- Born: Stanley John O'Dell; 20 November 1929; Campton, Bedfordshire, England
- Died: 21 March 2021 (aged 91)

Sir Stanley John Odell (born O'Dell; 20 November 1929 – 21 March 2021) was a British businessman who was Chairman of the National Union of Conservative and Unionist Associations from 1989 to 1990, an organisation of the Conservative Party in the United Kingdom.

== Early life ==
Odell was born on 20 November 1929 in Campton, Bedfordshire, the son of George Frederick O'Dell and Florence May Roberts, and a brother of Audrey Jepps. He was educated at Bedford Modern School.

== Career ==
Odell was Chairman of the Mid Bedfordshire Young Conservatives (1953–59) and Chairman of the Mid Bedfordshire Conservative Association (1964–69). He was Chairman of the National Union of Conservative and Unionist Associations (1989–90), an organisation of the Conservative Party in the United Kingdom, and was President of the Mid Bedfordshire Conservative Association between 1991 and 2005.

Odell was Chairman of the South Bedfordshire Community Health Care NHS Trust (1994–99); the Bedfordshire and Luton Community Health Care NHS Trust (1999–2001); the Mary Seacole Homes for the Homeless in Luton, (1999–2012); and the Anglo-American Committee, Chicksands, (1987–96).

Odell was knighted in 1986. He was an Honorary Fellow of the University of Bedfordshire and an Honorary Fellow of Luton University.

== Personal life ==
Odell was Chairman of the Biggleswade and District Young Farmers' Club (1949–51) and a Founder Playing Member of the Biggleswade Rugby Club in 1949. He was a Patron of the Friends of Chicksands Priory (1983–2008); Camphill, Bedfordshire (1998–2021); the John Bunyan Museum, Bedford (1999–2021) and was a Churchwarden of Campton Parish Church (1978–91).

Odell's recreations were politics and shooting. In 1952, he married Eileen Grace Stuart, daughter of Reginald Edward Percival Stuart; they had four daughters.

He died on 21 March 2021 at the age of 91.
