= Henry Wrong =

Canadian-born arts administrator (1930–2017)

Hentry Wrong
- Born: Henry Lewellys Barker Wrong; 20 April 1930
- Died: 2 August 2017 (aged 87)

Henry Lewellys Barker Wrong, CBE (20 April 1930 – 2 August 2017) was a Canadian-born arts administrator. He was the first director of the Barbican Centre from 1970 to 1990.
