= Hector Wilks =

Hector Mark Wilks MBE (1919, - 1992) was an English botanist and conservationist. A retired chartered surveyor, he was chairman of the Kent Trust for Nature Conservation. He was also a councillor on the Whitstable Urban District Council. He is perhaps best known for rediscovering the monkey orchid (Orchis simia) in Kent at a site near Faversham and subsequently introducing the species to Park Gate Down near Elham. The site near Faversham remains one of only two native sites for the monkey orchid in the British Isles and has remained closed to the public since its discovery. On 21 May 2007, Park Gate Down was renamed "The Hector Wilks Reserve" in recognition of his involvement with the reserve from its inception.

His sister was the teacher Jean Wilks.
