= Mirosław Vitali =

Polish surgeon (1914–1992)

Miroslaw (Mirek) Vitali, OBE (October 5, 1914 in Human, Russian Empire – February 19, 1992 in London, England) was a physician specialising in treatment and care of amputees. He was appointed to the Order of the British Empire in 1986 in recognition of his outstanding work helping British servicemen who lost limbs in World War II.

== Biography ==
He was born to Polish parents in Human, Russian Empire. He completed studies at the Medical University of Warsaw in 1939. Taken prisoner during the German offensive in September, 1939, he escaped and returned to Warsaw, where he became active in the underground movement while working in the orthopedic department of the Red Cross hospital. During the 1944 Warsaw Rising he managed a field hospital. After seven months as prisoner of war in Stalag IV-B he made his way to England via the Polish II Corps in Italy.

Shortly after he was demobilised in 1948, Vitali was appointed orthopedic registrar at Queen Mary's Hospital in Roehampton and commenced his lifelong work with amputees and developing improved artificial limbs. Vitali was elected a Fellow of the Royal College of Surgeons in 1963. In 1968 he became principal medical officer for prosthetic research at the hospital. After his retirement in 1979 he continued as a consultant for Queen Mary's Hospital, Westminster Hospital and the Royal National Orthopaedic Hospital. On behalf of the British Council he travelled all over the world, giving lectures and instructional courses to help improve the quality of prosthetic care and fitting of artificial limbs in many countries. He was trustee and adviser for the Douglas Bader Centre at Queen Mary's Hospital. In the 1980s, the Polish government awarded him the Order of Polonia Restituta in recognition of his work with prosthetics, and the Cross of Valour (Krzyż Walecznych) for his bravery in the Warsaw Rising. In 1986, he was made an Officer of the Order of the British Empire (OBE), in recognition of his work for wounded British soldiers.

He was co-author of a major textbook Amputations and Prostheses (ISBN 0-7020-0570-3), published in London in 1978 and translated into many languages.
