= Chief Coastguard =

In many territories and countries worldwide the Chief Coastguard is the highest-ranking officer of the Coastguard Service. Chief Coastguards are responsible for the policy, planning and execution of a Coastguard Service. In some countries this means that the Chief Coastguard is de facto Chief Executive officer of the Coastguard Service, although more commonly the Chief Coastguard reports to a government minister or executive agency, board or committee.

== HM Chief Coastguard (United Kingdom) ==
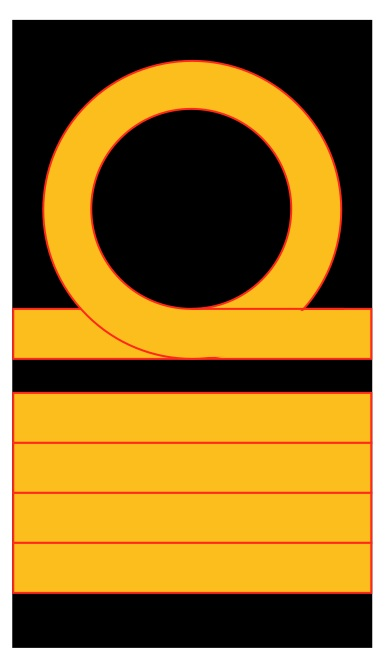
Rank insignia of the United Kingdom's Chief Coastguard.

=== Function ===
In the United Kingdom, the head of the operational Coastguard service bears the title "His Majesty's Chief Coastguard", usually shortened to simply "Chief Coastguard". When in uniform he or she wears rank markings similar to those of a Rear Admiral in the Royal Navy. The Chief Coastguard is the most senior member of the Coastguard service; he or she reports to the Chief Executive of the Maritime and Coastguard Agency (who is a civil servant, and not an operational coastguard), who in turn reports direct to the United Kingdom Government through the Secretary of State for Transport.

According to the official website of the UK Maritime and Coastguard Agency, the functions of the Chief Coastguard are to co-ordinate five main tasks:

- to initiate and co-ordinate civil maritime search and rescue within the UK Search and Rescue Region
- to initiate and co-ordinate counter-pollution measures to minimise the impact of pollution on the sea and shoreline
- to ensure the public interest is fully taken into account when an accident to a ship might require salvage or other emergency action
- to maintain contingency plans for dealing with major maritime incidents within UK waters
- to develop and promote a sea safety and SAR Prevention strategy

=== Recent office holders ===
John Astbury became Chief Coastguard in 1996 and combined this post with that of Director of Operations for the newly formed MCA in 1998. He retained this post until he became Chief Executive of the MCA in 2007: he was appointed a CBE in 2005. He was succeeded by Peter Dymond in 2007. Peter Dymond retired from the office of Chief Coastguard in 2009, and was appointed OBE for his meritorious service. He was replaced by Chief Coastguard Rod Johnson, who served until 2013. Pending the appointment of a new Chief Coastguard, Mr Dymond returned to the role as Acting Chief Coastguard until he retired in and was succeeded by Richard Martin, OBE, JP.

=== Chief Coastguard's Commendation (award) ===
Members of HM Coastguard are entitled to receive long service awards after stated periods of continuous service, but the Chief Coastguard is empowered to award the additional "Chief Coastguard's Commendation" as an award for bravery, or for exceptionally meritorious service. There are usually several annual awards of such commendations. During 2009, for example, a total of six awards were made.
