= Dussek Campbell Ltd =

Dussek Campbell Ltd was a UK-based company that manufactured speciality blends of waxes, oils, resins and polymers, for use in a variety of applications including the waterproofing of the insides of telecom and power cables, packaging, household items (e.g. candles), casting waxes for casting of metal parts in foundries, and construction.

The company had operations in a number of global locations including Canada, Australia and South Africa, with its head office in Crayford, near Dartford in Kent. It was for many years part of the speciality chemicals group of Burmah Castrol plc. Originally Dussek Brothers Ltd (cable compounds), Technical Waxes Ltd (packaging and household applications), Waxes Ltd (packaging and household applications), Claude Campbell Ltd (foundry metal casting waxes), and a blended polymers business ("APP Chemicals") the companies merged over the years, finally becoming Dussek Campbell in the late 1970s. The North American wax operations of Dussek Campbell, Inc. (formerly National Wax) used the railroad reporting mark NWAX.

The company was merged with BP's "Global Special Products" business in 2001 when BP acquired Burmah Castrol plc, and at the same time the metal casting waxes part of the business was merged with another former Burmah business, and more latterly was the subject of a management buyout. The metal casting wax business now operates under the name "Remet UK" and is based in the Medway area of Kent.

BP divested the former Dussek Campbell business in 2004, and it has since fragmented. The former "Dussek Brothers" cable filling materials business now operates out of the West Midlands and is owned by the German oil refining company H&R AG, and the former "Technical Waxes" blended waxes business was subject to a management buy-out by the then General Manager, Ian Appleton, and now operates as Kerax limited in Chorley, Lancs. The "APP Polymers" part of the business, based in Market Drayton, Shropshire, that supplied blends of polypropylene for bitumen modification, closed down ca.2001, but the branch of that business in the Netherlands continues under H&R AG's ownership.

With the exception of the wax blending site in Chorley, all of the other former Dussek Campbell UK sites have been demolished; the Crayford head office buildings were finally demolished in early 2010.
