= John Steeds (rugby union) =

England international rugby union player

- Full name: John Harold Steeds
- Born: 27 September 1916 Edmonton, London, England
- Died: 9 May 2009 (aged 92) Sussex, England
- School: St Edward's School
- University: St Catharine's College

Rugby union career
- Position: Hooker
International career
Years	Team	Apps	(Points)
1949–50	England	5	(0)

John Harold Steeds MBE (27 September 1916 – 9 May 2009) was an English international rugby union player.

Born in Edmonton, London, Steeds was educated at St Edward's School, Oxford.

Steeds played his rugby as a hooker and started out in senior rugby at Saracens as a 17-year old. He was a Lieutenant-Surgeon in the Royal Navy during the war, serving on the HMS Vansittart and HMS Ruler. A Cambridge rugby blue, Steeds was capped five times for England across the 1949 and 1950 Five Nations Championships.

A graduate of St Catharine's College, Steeds settled in Colchester after completing his medical training and took over a practice on Maldon Road. He was awarded an MBE in 1986 for services to the community.

== See also ==
- List of England national rugby union players
