= Ronald Norman (businessman) =

British businessman & author (born 1937)

Sir Ronald Norman OBE DL
- Born: 29 April 1937 (age 89); Kent
- Education: King's College London 1960
- Occupations: Businessman, Retired.
- Organization: Yuill Homes
- Known for: Property development and urban regeneration
- Notable work: Odd Man Out in the Alps
- Board member of: President of the Tees Valley Community Foundation, Chairman of the Teesside Development Corporation
- Spouses: Jennifer Mary Mansfield (m. 1961; div. 1972) Joyce Lyons (m. 1975)
- Children: 5
- Awards: Honorary Deputy Lieutenant of County Durham

Sir Ronald Norman, OBE, DL (born 29 April 1937) is a British businessman and author. Sir Ron received an OBE in 1986 for services to urban regeneration in Newcastle and was honoured with a knighthood in 1995 for services to Teesside.

== Personal life ==
The son of a postman, he won a scholarship to Dulwich College where he studied sciences and made a mark as a boxer. He then studied engineering at King's College London, graduating in 1960 with first-class honours in Civil Engineering and winning the University Boxing Championship. His book Odd Man Out in the Alps tells the story of his journey over two summers trekking 400 miles through the French Alps in little more than shorts and sandals.

== Companies ==
Sir Ron's early work as an engineer included the construction of the famous hyperbolic paraboloid roof on the Commonwealth Institute in Kensington. From civil engineering he moved into management consultancy, general construction, property development and urban renewal. Eventually, he launched his own development company committed to setting higher standards of development, in particular by respecting local architectural traditions. In partnership with Professor David Bellamy, he also ran a pioneering consultancy aimed at persuading his fellow developers of the importance of environmental considerations. He has held director appointments at 31 companies, including:

- President of the Tees Valley Community Foundation (previously known as Cleveland Community Foundation)
- Chairman of the Teesside Development Corporation
