= Dron & Dickson =

Dron & Dickson is a United Kingdom company specialising in integrated supply, installation and maintenance of harsh & hazardous area electrical equipment.

The company has experienced significant growth since its inception, which saw it record a £1 million pre-tax profit in 2012. ex Operating mainly within the oil and gas industry, the company also works in the renewables, decommissioning, pharmaceutical, and distillery sectors.

Dron & Dickson operates across two distinct divisions: one focusing on the supply of electrical equipment, and the other on the provision of services such as electrical engineering design, maintenance, repair and inspection.

The company has five UK branches with most recent premises opening up in the North West of England. In 2022 Dron & Dickson acquired Cable Solutions Worldwide Ltd (CSWL) to complement its existing business, this coincided with a record year with revenues of over £50M.

== History ==
Founded in 1927, Dron & Dickson supplied explosives to the mining and quarry industries, until the company changed direction towards the oil and gas industry during the 1970s. The company's initial function within the oil and gas industry was to provide a lighting design service for offshore accommodation modules. As market requirements changed, Dron & Dickson shifted its focus to offer product supply and maintenance.

In 1993 the company was awarded its first ex maintenance and inspection management contract. it now holds over 15 terms contracts (2022) across a range of energy and industrial sectors.

== Locations ==
Originally based in Scotland and headquartered in Stirling, the company has other bases in Aberdeen, Hull, Lowestoft, Stirling and Runcorn.

The company now operates across the UK, Europe, North Africa, the Middle East, the CIS, and Asia.

== Accolades ==
Dron & Dickson's growth has been recognised on a number of prestigious business league tables as follows -

Ranked number 10 on the 2014 Sunday Times HSBC International Track 200 league table

Ranked number 75 on the 2015 Sunday Times HSBC International Track 200 league table
