= Anita Grunder =

American geologist

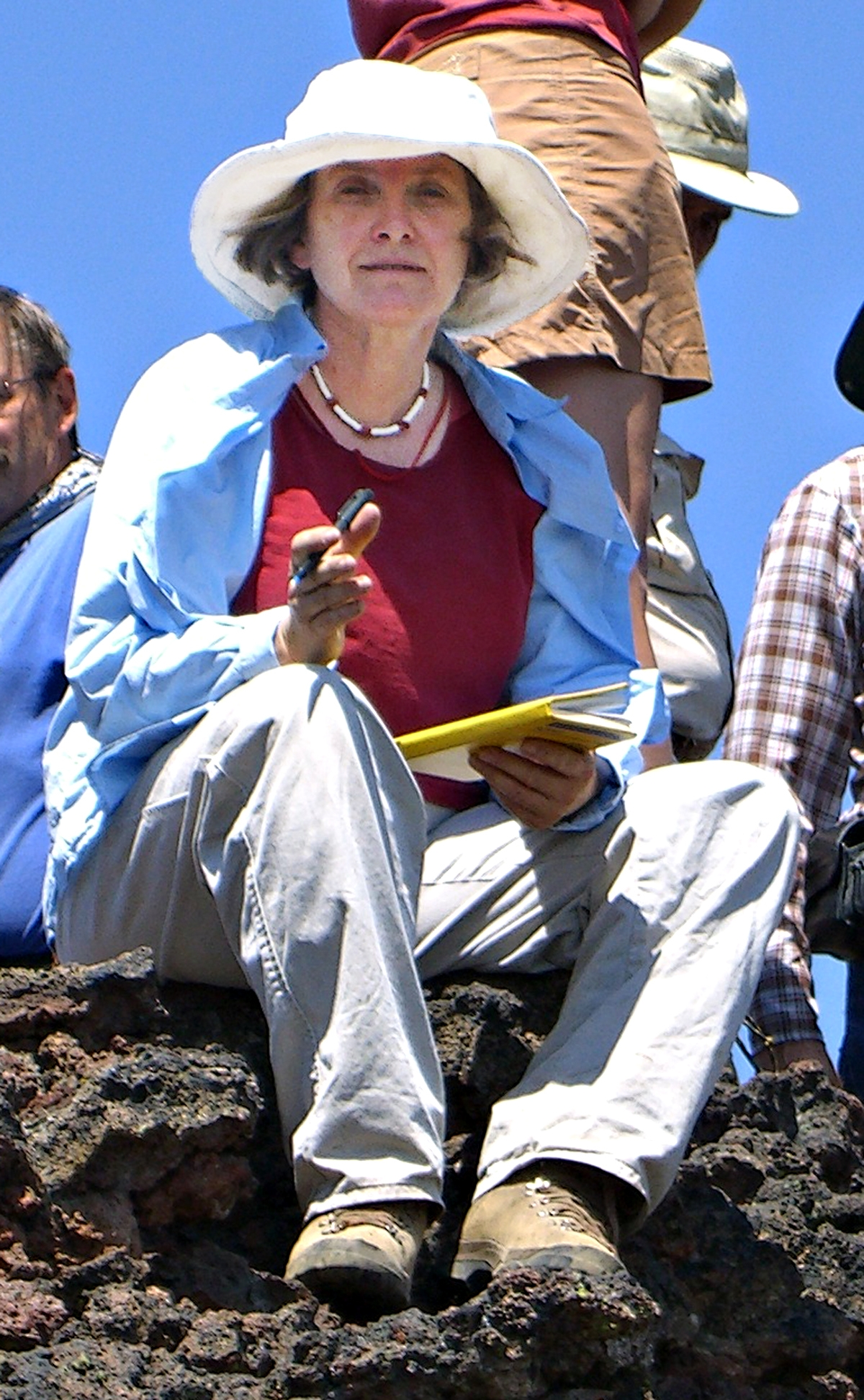
- Education: Stanford University
- Awards: See category below left.
- Scientific career
- Workplaces: Oregon State University
- Thesis: The Calabozos caldera complex : geology, petrology, and geochemistry of a major silicic volcanic center and hydrothermal system in the southern Andes (1986)
- Doctoral advisor: Gail Mahood

Anita Lizzie Grunder is an American geologist known for her research on volcanic rocks and the evolution of the magmas. She is an elected fellow of the Geological Society of America and of the Mineralogical Society of America. Anita’s scientific career has illuminated the inner workings of magmatic systems and volcanic processes across a range of geologic settings. From arc volcanism in the Andes and the Cascade Range to the rhyolite fields of the High Lava Plains, Oregon, to the vast Columbia River Basalt Group, Anita brings an integrative, multiscale, vision to the study of how the Earth’s crust evolves through magmatism and manifests as volcanism.

Philosophy: "It remains one of humanity’s greatest achievements that we have institutions dedicated to the development of the mind and the creation of knowledge." Anita Grunder, 2025

== Early Life ==
Born August 14, 1954 in Basel, Switzerland to Hermann A. Grunder and Lucienne Simone (Robert) Grunder. In 1959, the family moved to California. Grunder is fluent in English, German, and is competent French and Spanish. Possesses U.S. and Swiss citizenship.

== Education ==
- A.B. in paleontology from the University of California, Berkeley, 1977.
- PhD Geology, Stanford University, 1986. Her dissertation, “Calabozos caldera complex: geology, petrology, and geochemistry of a major silicic center and hydrothermal system in the southern Andes” was conducted with advisor Gail Mahood.

Between her undergraduate and graduate programs, Grunder worked as a field assistant with Gail Mahood (University of California, Berkeley, UCB) in the Sierra la Primavera caldera in Mexico and with Wes Hildreth and David A. Johnston (United States Geological Survey) in the Valley of Ten Thousand Smokes in Alaska. These immersive experiences in rugged terrains sealed her commitment to geology, establishing a career pattern rooted in fieldwork complemented by petrology and geochemistry. She also worked several years as a lab technician in the Argon Geochronology Laboratory at UCB, and in the Stable Isotope Laboratory (C,H,N) at the University of California, Los Angeles. She began her graduate career at Scripps Institution of Oceanography before transferring to Stanford University.

== Career ==
Oregon State University

- 1986-1992: Assistant professor of geology in the Oregon State University (OSU) Department of Geology.
- 1992-1998: Associate professor of geology in the College of Earth, Ocean, and Atmospheric Sciences, CEOAS, OSU
- 1998-2017: Professor of geology, CEOAS, OSU
- 2012-2017: Associate dean of academic programs, CEOAS, OSU
- 2017-present: Professor emerita at CEOAS

Visiting Scholar

- 2009: Federal Polytechnic Institute (ETH Zurich Switzerland)
- 2001-2002: Université Blaise Pascal, Clermont-Ferrand, France
- 1995: Geological Survey of Chile (SERNAGEOMIN), Santiago, Chile
- 1994-1995: Dept. of Geological Sciences, University of Washington, Seattle WA

Editorial Positions and Offices

- 1988-1999: Member editorial board for the Journal of Volcanology and Geothermal Research (JVGR)
- 1994-1997: Editor for Geology magazine.
- 2002-2006: Executive committee of International Association of Volcanology and Chemistry of the Earth's Interior (IAVCEI)
- 2004-2007: Associate editor of Journal of Geophysical Research, Solid Earth
- 2005: Coeditor special volume of JVGR titled, "Welding processes in volcanology: insights from field, experimental, and modeling studies."
- 2006-2010: Vice-President of IAVCEI.
- 2009-2011: Secretary of Volcanology, Petrology and Geochemistry (VGP) division of the American Geophysical Union (AGU)
- 2017-2020: Leadership of the Geological Society of America's (GSA) Mineralogy, Geochemistry, Petrology, and Volcanology (MGPV) Division.
- 2017: Coeditor of field trip volume IAVCEI
- 2019: Coeditor of special GSA volume honoring Donald A. Swanson
- 2021: Coeditor of field trip volume for GSA

== Research ==
Grunder is a field geologist who has worked on volcanoes and volcanic rocks in a variety of locations including Nevada, Oregon, and the Aucanquilcha region in Chile. Her early research was on the volcanic rocks and hydrothermal system at Calabozos crater in the Chilean Andes. She uses oxygen-18 isotopes in different types of rocks to reveal changes in magmatic activity over millions of years. In 2005, Grunder co-edited a collection of articles on welding processes in volcanic systems, and contributed an article on welded pyroclastic deposits from Oregon. In Hawaii, she worked on the sulfur dioxide released by the Kilauea volcano and collaborated with a graduate student working in public health, Bernadette Longo, to reveal increased health issues for people living downwind of the volcano. In 2020 she examined the geology of the volcanic material in the area surrounding Steens Mountain in southeastern Oregon. One of her students described her skills at explaining volcanic processes and noted that she is adept at making geology interesting to a range of people, both inside and outside academia.

== Selected publications ==
- Grunder, Anita L. (1995). "Material and thermal roles of basalt in crustal magmatism: Case study from eastern Nevada". Geology. 23 (10): 952. Bibcode:1995Geo....23..952G. doi:10.1130/0091-7613(1995)023<0952:MATROB>2.3.CO;2.
- Streck, Martin J.; Grunder, Anita L. (1995). "Crystallization and welding variations in a widespread ignimbrite sheet; the Rattlesnake Tuff, eastern Oregon, USA". Bulletin of Volcanology. 57 (3): 151–169. Bibcode:1995BVol...57..151S. doi:10.1007/BF00265035.
- Grunder, Anita; Russell, J.K. (2005). "Welding processes in volcanology: Insights from field, experimental, and modeling studies". Journal of Volcanology and Geothermal Research. 142 (1–2): 1–9. Bibcode:2005JVGR..142....1G. doi:10.1016/j.jvolgeores.2004.10.010.
- Jordan, Brennan T.; Grunder, Anita L.; Duncan, Robert A.; Deino, Alan L. (2004). "Geochronology of age-progressive volcanism of the Oregon High Lava Plains: Implications for the plume interpretation of Yellowstone". Journal of Geophysical Research: Solid Earth. 109 (B10) 2003JB002776. Bibcode:2004JGRB..10910202J. doi:10.1029/2003JB002776.
- Longo, A. A.; Dilles, J. H.; Grunder, A. L.; Duncan, R. (2010). "Evolution of Calc-Alkaline Volcanism and Associated Hydrothermal Gold Deposits at Yanacocha, Peru". Economic Geology. 105 (7): 1191–1241. Bibcode:2010EcGeo.105.1191L. doi:10.2113/econgeo.105.7.1191.

== Awards and honors ==
- 1989 received the Loyd Carter Award for Outstanding and Inspirational Teaching in Science from Oregon State University's College of Science.
- 1997 elected Fellow of the Geological Society of America
- 2001 awarded the Frederick H. Horne Award for Sustained Excellence in Teaching Science by the same college, recognizing ongoing contributions to science education
- 2009 named Outstanding Educator by the Association for Women Geoscientists.
- 2016 awarded the Patullo award for excellence in mentorship, CEOAS
- 2021 elected Fellow of the Mineralogical Society of America for her impactful work in mineralogy, petrology, and related fields
- 2025 awarded the GSA MGPV Division's Distinguished Geological Career Award

== Personal life ==
She is married to John Dilles, an economic geology professor emeritus at OSU. In 1986 they left Stanford University for Philomath, OR to teach in the Geology Department at OSU. Anita and John have three adult children.

Grunder volunteers in Oregon with the Independent Community Center, and one of their activities is the restoration of an old schoolhouse in Philomath, Oregon that was added to the National Register of Historic Places in 2013. In 2008, she led the effort to found the Muddy Creek Charter School in Oregon. Her outside sculpture piece "Excess Baggage" developed collectively by Warren Lisser, Susie Lisser and Grunder was presented at Burning Man in 2013.
