= Bruce Houghton =

New Zealand volcanologist

- Born: 29 April 1950 (age 76); Auckland, New Zealand
- Education: University of Auckland, University of Otago
- Scientific career
- Fields: Geology/Volcanology
- Workplaces: University of Hawaiʻi; Institute of Geological & Nuclear Sciences Limited (GNS), New Zealand
- Thesis: Geology of the Takitimu group and associated intrusive rocks, central Takitimu Mountains, western Southland, New Zealand (1977)

Bruce F. Houghton (born 29 April 1950 in Auckland, New Zealand) is a New Zealand volcanologist. He was a student at Auckland University, and University of Otago, where he completed a PhD in 1977 on the geology of the Takatimu Mountains in western Southland.

As of 2010, Houghton was the Hawai'i State volcanologist and the Gordon A. Macdonald Professor of Volcanology at the University of Hawaiʻi. In August 2017, Bruce was awarded the highest award in volcanology, the International Association of Volcanology and Chemistry of the Earth's Interior's Thorarinsson Medal. He is recognized as "a giant of volcanology".

== Selected publications ==
- Ross, P-S.; Peate, U.; McClintock, M.; White, J.D.L.; Skilling, I.P.; Houghton B.F. (2005). "Mafic volcaniclastic deposits in large igneous provinces: a review" (PDF). Journal of Volcanology and Geothermal Research. 145: 281–314. Bibcode:2005JVGR..145..281R. doi:10.1016/j.jvolgeores.2005.02.003.
- Gurioli, Lucia; Houghton, Bruce F.; Cashman, Katherine V.; Cioni, Raffaello (2004). "Complex changes in eruption dynamics during the 79 AD eruption of Vesuvius". Bulletin of Volcanology. 67 (2): 144–159. Bibcode:2005BVol...67..144G. doi:10.1007/s00445-004-0368-4. ISSN 0258-8900. S2CID 129529947.
- James D. L. White & Bruce F. Houghton (2000). "Surtseyan and Related Phreatomagmatic Eruptions". In Haraldur Sigurdsson; Bruce Houghton; Hazel Rymer; John Stix & Steve McNutt (eds.). Encyclopedia of Volcanoes. San Diego, California: Academic Press. pp. 495–512. ISBN 978-0-12-643140-7.
- Houghton, Bruce F.; C. J. N. Wilson; R. T. Smith; J. S. Gilbert (2000). "Phreatoplinian Eruptions". In Haraldur Sigurdsson; Bruce Houghton; Hazel Rymer; John Stix; Steve McNutt (eds.). Encyclopedia of Volcanoes. San Diego, California: Academic Press. pp. 513–526. ISBN 978-0-12-643140-7.
- Colin J. N. Wilson and Bruce F. Houghton (2000). "Pyroclastic Transport and Deposition". In Haraldur Sigurdsson; Bruce Houghton; Hazel Rymer; John Stix; Steve McNutt (eds.). Encyclopedia of Volcanoes. San Diego, California: Academic Press. pp. 545–554. ISBN 978-0-12-643140-7.
- Houghton, Bruce F.; C. J. N. Wilson; D. M. Pyle (2000). "Pyroclastic Fall Deposits". In Haraldur Sigurdsson; Bruce Houghton; Hazel Rymer; John Stix; Steve McNutt (eds.). Encyclopedia of Volcanoes. San Diego, California: Academic Press. pp. 555–570. ISBN 978-0-12-643140-7.
- Wilson, C.J.N.; Houghton, B.F.; McWilliams, M.O.; Lanphere, M.A.; Weaver, South Dakota; Briggs, R.M. (1995). "Evolution of Taupo Volcanic Zone, New Zealand: a review". Journal of Volcanology and Geothermal Research. 68: 1–28. doi:10.1016/0377-0273(95)00006-G.
- Houghton, B.F.; Wilson, C.J.N.; McWilliams, M.O.; Lanphere, M.A.; Weaver, S.D.; Briggs, R.M.; Pringle, M.S. (1995). "Chronology and dynamics of a large silicic magmatic system: central Taupo Volcanic Zone, New Zealand". Geology. 23 (1): 13–16. Bibcode:1995Geo....23...13H. doi:10.1130/0091-7613(1995)023<0013:CADOAL>2.3.CO;2.
- Jocelyn McPhie & Bruce F. Houghton (1993). Explosive Volcanism: Processes and Products. IAVCEI, Commission on Explosive Volcanism Short Course, Canberra, Australia, 23–24 September 1993.
