= Wes Hildreth =

American geologist (1938–2025)

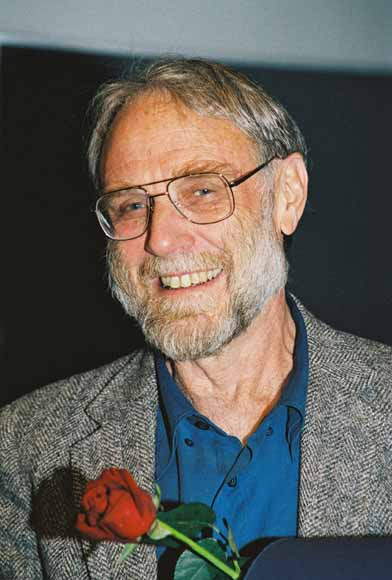
- Hildreth in 2004
- Born: Edward Wesley Hildreth III; August 17, 1938; Newton, Massachusetts, U.S.
- Died: June 19, 2025 (aged 86); Mineral County, Nevada, U.S.
- Education: Harvard College (BA); University of California, Berkeley (PhD)
- Spouses: Nancy Brown (m. 1964, d. 1973); Gail Mahood (m. 1982)
- Scientific career
- Fields: Geological mapping; petrology (igneous); volcanology
- Academic advisors: Ian S. E. Carmichael and others

Edward Wesley Hildreth III (August 17, 1938 – June 19, 2025) was an American geologist affiliated with the U.S. Geological Survey (USGS) and its California Volcano Observatory. Employed by the USGS as a research geologist from 1977 until his death, Hildreth was a Department of the Interior senior scientist. Described in Wired as "one of the great volcanologists/petrologists of our time," his work in the fields of volcanology, petrology, and geological mapping had been recognized with the Bowen Award and Thorarinsson Medal, and with fellowship in the Geological Society of America (GSA) and the American Geophysical Union. Hildreth's body of research included work on the volcanic history of the Cascade Range, magmatism of the Long Valley Caldera, and mapping of mountain regions in the Andes.

== Early life and education ==
Wes Hildreth, full name Edward Wesley Hildreth III, was born on August 17, 1938, in Newton, Massachusetts, and was of Scottish ancestry. His parents—Marion Frederica “Freddie” MacVicar, a housewife from an upper class family, and George Edward Hildreth, a middle class retail store manager—had married earlier that year. Wes was their firstborn, followed by his siblings Deborah and Bruce. Wes grew up "bicoastal", and lived most of his life in either Greater Boston or the San Francisco Bay Area; he attended schools in both California and Massachusetts, and graduated in 1956 as the salutatorian of Tamalpais High School in Mill Valley, California. Hildreth ran the Dipsea Race in 1955, while a student at Tamalpais.

Hildreth attended Harvard College, the undergraduate school of liberal arts and sciences at Harvard University, where he majored in geology with a minor in government. While at Harvard, he was a cross country runner for the Harvard Crimson. He received a Detur Book Prize (awarded to sophomores with high academic standing) in 1958. Between his sophomore and junior years, he joined an Army Reserve unit and trained for six months at Fort Ord, earning the distinction "Outstanding Soldier of the Cycle" in 1959. In 1960, he placed 29th in the 1960 Boston Marathon, and was elected to Phi Beta Kappa. Hildreth graduated with a Bachelor of Arts degree cum laude in 1961. After graduating, he received Harvard's Sheldon Fellowship—a scholarship to travel the world—then worked for four years (1966–1970) as a seasonal naturalist for the National Park Service. One of his duty stations included Death Valley National Park where he befriended Edward Abbey. One season was with the Park Service at Grand Canyon National Park in 1967. That year Wes became friends with Grand Canyon hikers Harvey Butchart and Colin Fletcher. With their advice, in 1968, he and Jack Fulton hiked the length of Grand Canyon National Park from Topocoba Hilltop to the Hopi Salt Trail, becoming the first people documented to make that hike. In 1969, Wes and his wife Nancy boated the Colorado River through Grand Canyon with Otis R. Marston.

Hildreth started graduate school in 1970, but dropped out under the domestic pressure of the Vietnam War. He later returned to graduate studies; under the advisorship of Ian S. E. Carmichael, Charles M. Gilbert, and Herbert R. Shaw, Hildreth received a Doctor of Philosophy degree from the University of California, Berkeley in 1977, staying at Berkeley after graduation to complete postdoctoral work with Carmichael.

== Career and research ==
Starting in 1966, five years after his bachelor's degree was completed, Hildreth was a seasonal naturalist for the National Park Service. That same year, he conducted research at Muir Woods National Monument, and published a report on the history of the area. During his time with the Park Service, he worked at Death Valley National Park, Olympic National Park, Grand Canyon National Park, and Glacier Bay National Park and Preserve. He left his position in 1970, later becoming an instructor at the University of California, Berkeley, where he worked from 1973 to 1975. In 1977, Hildreth received his Ph.D. from Berkeley; he joined the U.S. Geological Survey as a research geologist in the same year.

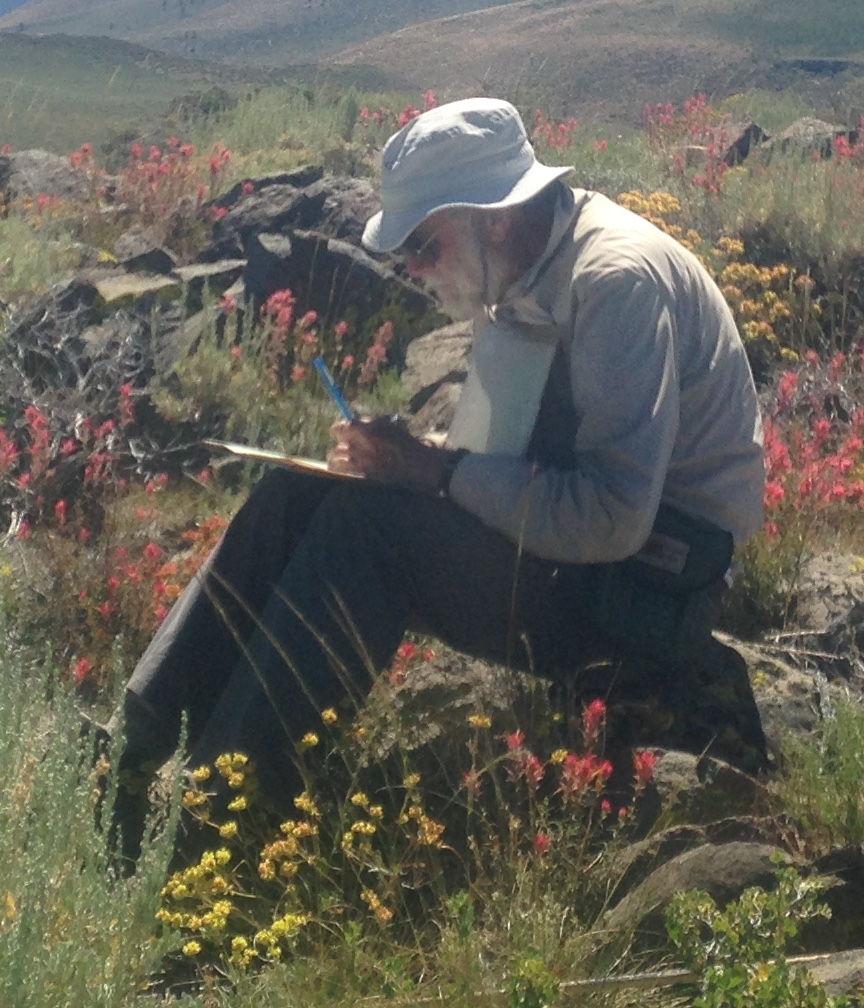
Hildreth pictured in Long Valley Caldera, 2016

Hildreth's interest in the Panamint Ranges led him to return to Death Valley and the Bishop Tuff while studying at Berkeley. His analysis of the tuff was a major contribution to the field, and since that time he has published on a wide array of geoscience topics, including volcanology, petrology, and geological mapping, with a focus on continental formations such as calderas. In the 1970s, Hildreth saw a start to his career by studying the Bishop Tuff and Long Valley Caldera, and also by collaborating with Bob Christiansen on research in Yellowstone National Park. His early research also helped solidify the scientific consensus that there is compositional zoning of magma reservoirs.

Prior to 1980, Hildreth's primary research partner was David A. Johnston, though he was killed by the 1980 eruption of Mount St. Helens. After that summer, much of Hildreth's research was conducted with Judy Fierstein, fellow USGS geologist. Their collaboration began in 1980, when Hildreth took Fierstein—then a fresh college graduate—to the Valley of Ten Thousand Smokes in Katmai National Park and Preserve to conduct field research. Hildreth had been studying the geology of Katmai since 1976, but this was Fierstein's first experience in the park. In 2012, Hildreth and Fierstein published a report to commemorate the centennial of the 1912 eruption of Novarupta. The pair had also published research on other volcanoes within the park, including Kaguyak Caldera. Their enduring partnership proved fruitful, with them both becoming vital to each other's research. In 2019, the duo won the Florence Bascom Geologic Mapping Award, conferred by the Geological Society of America, for their mapping efforts in Alaska, Chile, and the western United States.

In 1979, Hildreth published the seminal paper on Bishop Tuff studies. Subsequent works by him helped establish a greater understanding of the Bishop Tuff and its origins. In the Andes, his work made him a leading expert on the geology of Laguna del Maule. At the time of his death in 2025, Hildreth was a staff member of the USGS California Volcano Observatory and worked out of Menlo Park, California.

=== Professional service ===
Hildreth served as an associate editor of Andean Geology from 1987 to 2025, a role he previously held at the Journal of Geophysical Research from 1984 to 1986. From 1991 to 2001, he also served on the editorial board of the Bulletin of Volcanology. Hildreth also participated in public events—he was a participant in the 2005 GSA field forum in the Sierra Nevada and the White–Inyo Mountains. He again participated in a GSA field forum in 2009, in Bishop, California, which was adapted into a special issue of Lithosphere. In July 2016, Hildreth and Fierstein hosted an interpretive lecture and hike at Devils Postpile National Monument.

=== Awards and honors ===
At the May 1985 meeting of the Geological Society of America, Hildreth was elected a fellow of the society. In December 1985, he was awarded the Norman L. Bowen Award (named for Norman L. Bowen) of the American Geophysical Union for his geochemical and petrologic studies of the Bishop Tuff, Novarupta, and Yellowstone. Hildreth became a fellow of the union in January 1995. In 2004, Hildreth was awarded the Thorarinsson Medal (named for Sigurdur Thorarinsson) for his many contributions to volcanology, including eruptive and petrological studies at Mount Baker and Mount Adams in the Cascade Range, Mount Katmai in Alaska, and the Yellowstone Caldera; mapping of volcanic calderas in the Andes; and magmatic studies at Long Valley. The GSA awarded Hildreth and Fierstein the 2019 Florence Bascom Geologic Mapping Award (named for Florence Bascom) for their mapping efforts at Adams, Baker, Katmai, Laguna del Maule, and Long Valley as well as the Three Sisters, Simcoe Mountains, Pantelleria, Quizapu–Descabezado, and Mammoth Mountain.

== Personal life and death ==
In 1964, Hildreth married Nancy Williams (now Nancy Brown, married to Roger Brown). Wes and Nancy separated in 1973 but appeared in an oral history interview together in 2016. Hildreth met Gail Mahood while a student at Berkeley, and they were married in 1982. The two were both geologists, and had published papers together.

On June 19, 2025, around 11:50 a.m., Hildreth was killed in a crash while traveling on State Route 360 in Nevada. He was the passenger in a Chevrolet Tahoe that was struck while turning left by a semi-truck attempting to overtake. Hildreth was declared dead on the scene, at the age of 86. An unnamed driver was hospitalized. Earlier that month, Hildreth had been inducted into the Dipsea Race Hall of Fame.

The California Volcano Observatory published a memorial to Hildreth on July 8, 2025. It was reposted the same day by the Dipsea Race organization on Facebook.
