= Charles Gilbert =

Charles Gilbert may refer to:

- Charles Gilbert (cricketer) (1855–1937), English cricketer
- Charles Allan Gilbert (1873–1929), American artist
- Charles Champion Gilbert (1822–1903), American soldier
- Charles Henry Gilbert (1859–1928), American ichthyologist
- Charles M. Gilbert (1910–1988), American geologist
- Charles Web Gilbert (1867–1925), Australian sculptor
- Charles Gilbert Jr., American composer, lyricist, writer and educator
- Charles Gilbert (American football) (born 1987), American football wide receiver
- Charles Sandoe Gilbert (1760–1831), Cornish druggist and historian of Cornwall
- Charles Kendall Gilbert (1878–1958), bishop of the Episcopal Diocese of New York
- C. P. H. Gilbert (Charles Pierrepont Henry Gilbert, 1861–1952), American architect
