= Hans-Ulrich Schmincke =

German volcanologist (1937–2024)

- Born: 21 October 1937; Detmold, Gau Westphalia-North, German Reich
- Died: 24 August 2024 (aged 86)
- Awards: Bowen Award (1985): Leibniz Prize (1991); Thorarinsson Medal (1993); Hans-Stille-Medaille (2001); Gustav-Steinmann-Medaille (2012); State of Rhineland-Palatinate Medal of Merit (2023)
- Scientific career
- Fields: Volcanology
- Workplaces: Ruhr University Bochum (1969–1990); GEOMAR Helmholtz Centre for Ocean Research Kiel (1990–2003)

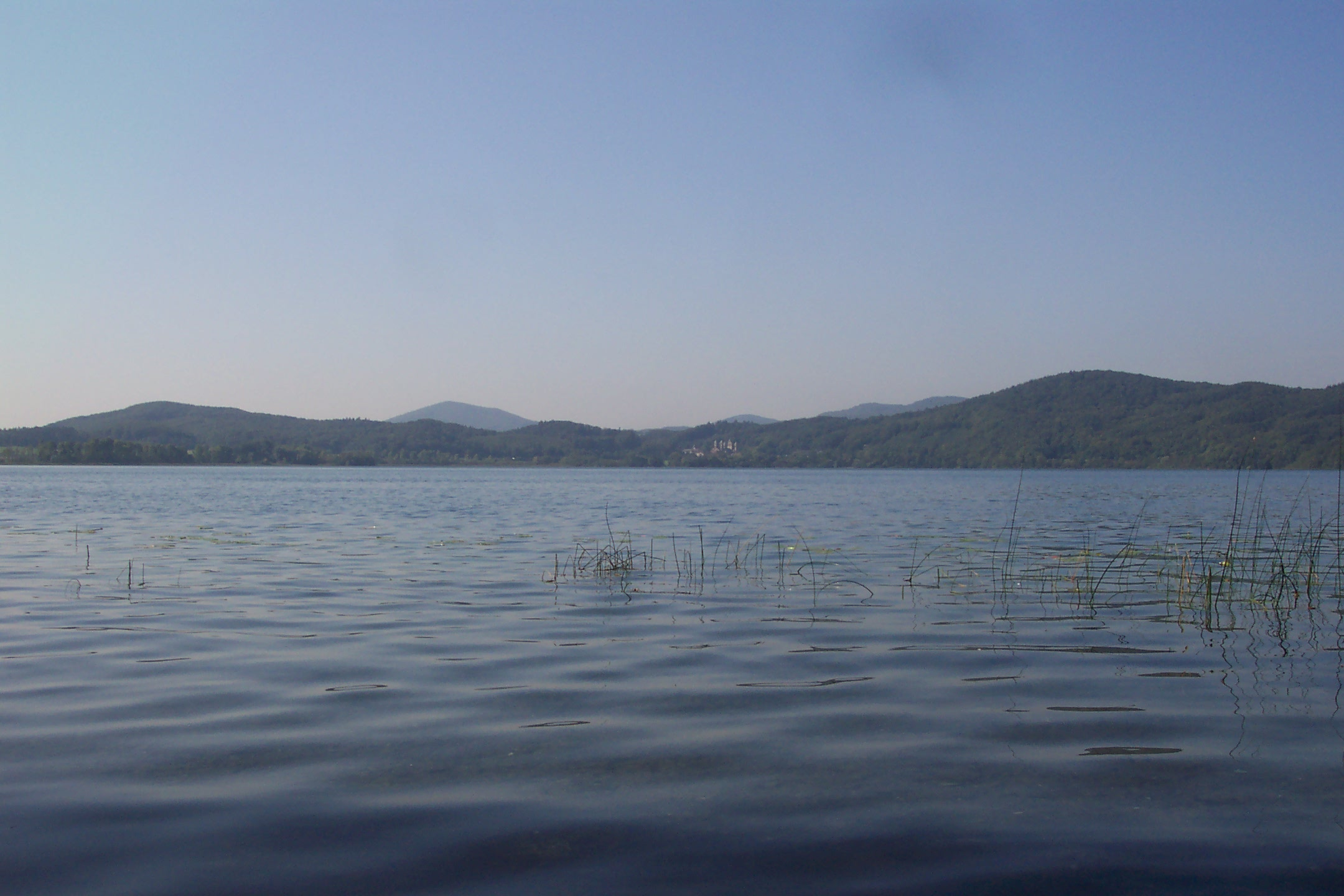
Laacher See, a German caldera lake, researched by H.-U. Schmincke

Hans-Ulrich Schmincke (21 October 1937 – 24 August 2024) was a German volcanologist, who published over 300 books and scientific papers over the course of his career. He was awarded the Thorarinsson Medal of the International Association of Volcanology (IAVCEI) in 1993, and the Steinmann Medal of the German Geological Association in 2012.

== Early life and education ==
Hans-Ulrich Schmincke was born in Detmold, German Reich in 1937. Between 1957 and 1964, Schmincke studied Geology and Petrology at universities in Germany, and then the USA, including University of Göttingen, Albert-Ludwigs-Universität Freiburg, and RWTH Aachen. He completed his doctoral research between 1962 and 1964 at Johns Hopkins University and the University of California, Santa Barbara, with studies on the flood basalts that were exposed in the area around the Hanford complex near the Columbia River in the Pacific Northwest. His primary advisor was geologist Aaron C. Waters, who moved to Santa Barbara in 1963, and he was also mentored by sedimentologist Francis J. Pettijohn.

== Employment and research ==
Schmincke returned to Germany in late 1964, and was a research fellow at the University of Tübingen in 1964–65 and at the University of Heidelberg 1965–1969.

He later worked at the Ruhr University Bochum (1969–90), before becoming the head of the department of volcanology and petrology (1990–2003) at the GEOMAR, University of Kiel, where he remained until his retirement.

During his research career, Schmincke's main focus was on volcanology. Following his doctoral work on flood basalts, he worked on many aspects of volcanism around the world. One of his early papers described the welding and flow of ash flow tuffs from Gran Canaria, which led on to career-long studies of pyroclastic rocks. He was involved in an Icelandic Research Drilling project, which drilled 3 km (1.9 mi) through the Icelandic crust near Reyðarfjörður in 1978. He also worked with the International Crustal Drilling Research Group, on a related drilling project called the Cyprus Crustal Study Project, which drilled at a number of sites across the Troodos ophiolite, Cyprus, between 1982 and 1985.

For many years, Schmincke worked on the volcanology of the Canary Islands, and was co-chief scientist of Ocean Drilling Programme (ODP) leg 157, which cored parts of the Atlantic ocean sea-floor and abyssal plain off the Canary Islands in 1994.

In Germany, Schmincke carried out research on the pyroclastic sequences of the Eifel volcanic district over many years, in particular the Laacher See volcano.

Further afield, he worked on volcanic deposits in Central America, and in 1993, carried out fieldwork in China at Paektusan volcano. Schmincke was one of the first European scientists to study this large caldera volcano.

He published over 300 scientific articles in volcanology and petrology through his career.

== Service ==
Schmincke was editor, or editor-in-chief, of a number of scientific journals through his career. He led the redesign and modernisation of the volcanological journal Bulletin of Volcanology, which had previously been published as the Bulletin Volcanologique, and was editor in chief from 1985–95.

Hans-Ulrich Schmincke was secretary general of the International Association of Volcanology and Chemistry of the Earth's Interior (IAVCEI, 1983–91).

== Death ==
In September 2024, it was announced that Schmincke had died on 24 August 2024. He was 86.

== Honours ==
Schmincke received multiple national and international awards in recognition of his work. These include the Norman L. Bowen Award of the American Geophysical Union in 1985; the Leibniz Prize of the German Research Foundation (Deutschen Forschungsgemeinschaft) in 1991; the Thorarinsson Medal of the International Association of Volcanology and Chemistry of the Earth's Interior in 1993; the Hans-Stille Medal in 2001, and the Gustav-Steinmann Medal of the German Geological Association in 2012.

In 2023, Schmicke was awarded the State of Rhineland-Palatinate Medal of Merit, for "outstanding scientific commitment and dedication to Rhineland-Palatinate", in particular his contributions to the creation of the two volcano parks in the Eifel, at Daun and Plaidt.

== Selected publications ==
Schmincke was co-author with RV Fisher of the book Pyroclastic Rocks, in 1984. His popular book Volcanism was first published in 1986 under the German title "Vulkanismus". This was later published as second edition in 2000 with translations into English (2004) and Japanese (2009); there was a third edition in 2010.

- Schmincke, Hans-Ulrich (2013). Vulkanismus (4th ed.). Darmstadt: Wissenschaftliche Buchgesellschaft (WBG). p. 104. ISBN 978-3-534-26245-8. English version: Hans-Ulrich Schmincke: Volcanism, scientific book company 2000, ISBN 35-3414-102-4
- Schmincke, Hans-Ulrich (2009). Vulkane der Eifel – Aufbau, Entstehung und heutige Bedeutung. Spektrum-Akademischer Verlag 2009. ISBN 978-3-8274-2366-5.
- Schmincke, Hans-Ulrich; Sumita, Mari (2010). Geological Evolution of the Canary Islands. Koblenz: Görres Verlag. ISBN 978-3-8697-2005-0.
- Fisher, R.V.; Schmincke, H-U. (1984). Pyroclastic Rocks. Springer. doi:10.1007/978-3-642-74864-6. ISBN 978-3-642-74864-6.
