= Mount Thorarinsson =

Mountain in Graham Land, Antarctica

Mount Thorarinsson (67°15′S 64°59′W) is a peak at the south side of the terminus of Hess Glacier on the east coast of Graham Land. The feature forms a point on the rocky spur that descends from the plateau, and is one of the most distinctive features along the coast as viewed from the Larsen Ice Shelf. This coastal area was photographed by several American expeditions: United States Antarctic Service (USAS), 1939–41; Ronne Antarctic Research Expedition (RARE), 1947–48; U.S. Navy photos, 1968. Mapped by Falkland Islands Dependencies Survey (FIDS), 1947–48. Named by United Kingdom Antarctic Place-Names Committee (UK-APC) for Sigurdur Thorarinsson, Icelandic glaciologist.
