= Steve Sparks (volcanologist) =

British volcanologist (born 1949)

Steve Sparks CBE FRS
- Born: 15 May 1949 (age 77); Harpenden, Hertfordshire, England
- Education: Imperial College London
- Awards: Bigsby Medal (1985); Murchison Medal (1998); Arthur Holmes Medal (2005); Thorarinsson Medal (2008); Wollaston Medal (2011); Vetlesen Prize (2015); Royal Medal (2018)
- Scientific career
- Workplaces: University of Bristol
- Doctoral advisor: George P. L. Walker
- Notable students: Jenni Barclay, Jonathan Blundy, Costanza Bonadonna, Claire Horwell, David Pyle

Sir Robert Stephen John Sparks, CBE, FRS (born Harpenden, Hertfordshire, 15 May 1949) is Chaning Wills Professor of Geology in the School of Earth Sciences at the University of Bristol. He is one of the world's leading volcanologists and has been widely recognised his pioneering research into the physics of eruptions, volcanic geology, igneous petrology, volcanic hazards and risk assessment, and wider services to the science community.

== Childhood and Career ==
Sparkes parents were Kenneth Grenfell Sparks and Ruth Joan Rugman. The family moved from Herpenden to Chester in 1954 where he attended Abbey Gate College, Chester Cathedral Choir School (1956-1961) and Wellington School, Bebington (1961-1966). After a family move to Baildon, Yorkshire he attended Bingley Grammar School (1967-1968).

Sparks attended university at Imperial College, where he first completed a B.Sc. (1971), and then a PhD (1974) under the supervision of George P. L. Walker. He was subsequently a Research Fellow at Lancaster University (1976–1978), a NATO postdoctoral fellow at the Graduate School of Oceanography, University of Rhode Island, USA (1976–1978), and then lecturer at University of Cambridge Department of Earth Sciences (1978–1989), where he was also a Fellow of Trinity Hall, Cambridge. He took up the Chaning Wills Chair of Geology at the University of Bristol in 1989. Sparks has held a number of distinguished visiting positions at other universities, including a period as Sherman Fairchild Distinguished Scholar at California Institute of Technology in 1987, and as an Edward Bass Scholar at Yale University (2006–2007). He became Emeritus Professor at Bristol University in 2020.

Sparks has been hugely influential in the fields of both volcanology and igneous petrology. His early work developed conceptual models of volcanic processes based on geological observations combined with developing (in close collaboration with applied mathematicians Lionel Wilson and Herbert Huppert) the first quantitative fluid dynamical models of volcanic flows. These models explain how formation of gas bubbles and multiphase flows drive many igneous and volcanic phenomena

Sparks helped develop and refined models of volcano physics informed by geological, petrological, geochemical and geophysical observations, by mathematical modelling and through laboratory experiments on analogue materials. His work has addressed fundamental questions of how magma reservoirs form, magma ascent in the crust, igneous intrusion mechanisms, formation of volcanogenic ore deposits, causes of magma instabilities leading to episodic volcanism, eruption triggering, formation of conduits and vents, dynamics of explosive eruptions that explain how pyroclastic flows form, transitions between explosive and effusive (lava) eruptions, dynamics of hazardous volcanic flows (e.g. pyroclastic flows, and lavas), dynamics of volcanic plumes and how volcanic ash and gas is dispersed in the atmosphere, and the frequency-magnitude relationships of volcanic eruptions.

Sparks' research has addressed environmental and societal impacts of volcanism, including: diverse applications to eruption and hazards forecasting; assessment of volcanic hazards and their attendant risks; and broader issues such as climate change, origin of metallic ore resources and radioactive waste management. He was involved in management of volcanic emergencies, notably the 1995-2010 eruption of the Soufrière Hills Volcano, Montserrat during which he worked with William Aspinall to pioneer novel approaches to risk assessment and risk management which are now being widely applied internationally. He led the development of global databases of explosive volcanic eruptions and volcanic fatalities in historic eruptions that inform assessing rates of volcanism, forecasting and hazard assessment efforts, and the first co-ordinated international assessment of global volcanic risk in 2015 for UNISDR. His applied contributions include leading the VolFilm project of public information films in 8 different languages to inform populations living near active

He has published over 500 papers, which have been cited more than 65,000 times, and is an ISI Highly Cited Researcher. He is the author or editor of several books on volcanic themes and natural hazards.

== Professional Service ==
Sparks was President of the Geological Society of London from 1994 to 1996, President of IAVCEI from 1999 to 2003, and is President-elect of the VGP section of the American Geophysical Union for 2009. Sparks was chair of the 2008 UK Research Assessment Exercise Panel for Earth Sciences.

Sparks became chair of ACME in 2012.

== Recognition and Awards ==
Sparks was elected a Fellow of the Royal Society in 1988 and a Fellow of the American Geophysical Union in 1998. His research has been recognised by several awards including: the Bigsby (1985), Murchinson (1998) and Wollaston (2011) medals from the Geological Society of London; the Bakerian Lecture of the Royal Society (2000); Arthur L Day Medal (2000) of the Geological Society of America; Arthur Holmes Medal (2004) of the European Union of Geosciences; Thorarinsson Medal (2008) of the International Association of Volcanology and Chemistry of the Earth's Interior; the 2015 Vetlesen Prize and the Royal Medal.

Sparks was appointed a Commander of the Order of the British Empire in the 2010 Birthday Honours for services to Environmental Sciences and a Knight Bachelor in the 2018 New Year Honours for services to Volcanology and Geology. He holds honorary degrees from Plymouth University, Lancaster University, Univerisité Blaise Pascal, the Sorbonne and the 2006 Science Prize of Chiba University, Japan.

== Personal life ==
Sparks married Ann Elizabeth Talbot in June 1971 and has two sons.
