= Volcano (1997 film) =

1997 film by Mick Jackson

- Theatrical release poster
- Directed by: Mick Jackson
- Screenplay by: Jerome Armstrong; Billy Ray
- Story by: Jerome Armstrong
- Produced by: Neal H. Moritz; Andrew Z. Davis
- Starring: Tommy Lee Jones; Anne Heche; Gaby Hoffmann; Don Cheadle; Keith David
- Cinematography: Theo van de Sande
- Edited by: Don Brochu; Michael Tronick
- Music by: Alan Silvestri
- Production companies: Fox 2000 Pictures; The Donners' Company; Original Film
- Distributed by: 20th Century Fox
- Release date: April 25, 1997
- Running time: 104 minutes
- Country: United States
- Language: English
- Budget: $90 million
- Box office: $122.8 million

Volcano is a 1997 American disaster film directed by Mick Jackson, written by Jerome Armstrong and Billy Ray, and produced by Neal H. Moritz and Andrew Z. Davis. The film stars Tommy Lee Jones in the lead role, Anne Heche, Gaby Hoffmann, Don Cheadle, and Keith David. It tells the story of an effort to divert the path of a dangerous lava flow through the streets of Los Angeles following the formation of a volcano at the La Brea Tar Pits. The story was inspired by the 1943 formation of the Parícutin volcano in Mexico.

Volcano was released by 20th Century Fox in the United States on April 25, 1997. It received mixed reviews from critics and grossed $122.8 million worldwide on a $90 million budget.

== Plot ==
In downtown Los Angeles, an earthquake strikes. Michael "Mike" Roark, the new director of the city's Office of Emergency Management, insists on coming to work to help with the crisis even though he has been on vacation with his daughter, Kelly. His associate, Emmit Reese, notes that the quake caused no major damage, but 7 utility workers are later burned to death in a storm drain at MacArthur Park. As a precaution, Roark tries to halt the subway lines near the location of the earthquake, though MTA Chairman Stan Olber believes that there is no threat to the trains. Roark then takes it upon himself to investigate the storm drain, accompanied by his co-worker Gator Harris. As they explore, the storm drain begins to shake violently and hot gases begin to fill the tunnel. Roark and Harris barely escape and order a complete evacuation from the park. Roark then calls in Seismologist Amy Barnes, who believes that a volcano may be forming beneath the city as the earthquake opens a fissure in the fault line, to which magma can potentially rise through it, but she has insufficient evidence to make Roark take action.

The next day at 5:14am, Amy and her assistant Rachel venture into the storm drain to investigate. As they collect samples, the San Andreas Fault unleashes a strong earthquake that strikes the city. A power outage occurs across the entire city, and a subway train derails from falling debris. Rachel falls into a crack caused by the quake and is killed by a rush of hot gases. Later, as Roark and Kelly drive down Wilshire Boulevard, hot steam bursts from the manholes and ash starts falling from the sky as the La Brea Tar Pits boils with massive smoke and meteors launch into the city, setting buildings on fire and destroying a fire truck, overturning it with a firefighter trapped inside. Roark helps the injured civilians and after another strong earthquake, a small cinder cone volcano is formed and erupts from the Tar Pits. Lava then begins to flow freely down Wilshire, incinerating everything in its path and killing two firefighters in the overturned fire truck. Roark and Kelly become separated, as she is injured when a lava bomb burns her leg and is taken to Cedars-Sinai Medical Center along with other patients, while Roark stays behind to help the people evacuate Wilshire.

Meanwhile, Stan leads his team through the Red Line subway tunnel to the derailed train to search for survivors. As they help the unconscious passengers onboard, they discover that lava is flowing through the tunnel and evacuate the passengers off the train. Stan realizes the driver is still on the train and goes back in to save him just as the lava reaches the train and begins melting it. Stan carries the unconscious driver through the train back to his team, but realizes the lava has flowed too far for him to jump to safety. With no other option, Stan sacrifices his life by jumping into the lava flow before he tosses the driver to safety.

Roark, Amy and LAPD lieutenant Ed Fox devise a plan to use concrete barriers to create a blockade at the end of Wilshire, which obstructs the lava, preventing it from flowing down Fairfax Avenue and doing further damage to the city. A team of firefighters use all the water from their hoses and a fleet of helicopters dump gallons of water collected from the Pacific Ocean to subdue the lava and volcano, forming a crust and making the plan a success. However, Amy thinks that magma is still flowing underneath the city because ash is still falling. When Roark helps Amy confirm her suspicions, they discover that lava is flowing fast through the Red Line subway system. Amy then predicts that another eruption will occur at the end of the tunnel at Cedars-Sinai and, after calculating the speed of the flowing lava, determines that it will reach the end of the tunnel in 30 minutes.

Roark devises another plan to demolish a 22-story condominium building using explosive charges to create a "dam" in order to block the lava from flowing toward the hospital and the rest of the West Side, thus diverting it into the Ballona Creek storm drain which leads directly into the Pacific Ocean. As a demolitions team plant the charges, the lava reaches the end of the tunnel and a massive eruption occurs, endangering the patients on the street. With only seconds left, they detonate the charges in the ground to create a trench for the lava flow, while Gator Harris and an LAPD Bomb Squad officer (trapped under debris) sacrifice their lives to detonate the final charges in the building. Roark then spots Kelly nearby, trying to retrieve a little boy she was watching who wandered off. The two are directly in the collapsing building's path. Roark barely manages to save them from being crushed. The plan succeeds, and the lava flows down Ballona Creek directly into the ocean, shutting down the volcano and ending the eruption. After the dust settles, the sky opens up and starts raining. Roark, Kelly, and the boy emerge from the rubble unscathed and reunite with Amy before heading home, while Emmit and his associates stay to help the survivors.

Meanwhile, at the Tar Pits, the volcano (now being named "Mount Wilshire") has taken shape above ground and remains active.

== Cast ==
- Tommy Lee Jones as Michael "Mike" Roark, the director of the Office of Emergency Management, and Kelly's father.
- Anne Heche as Amy Barnes, a geologist and seismologist from the California Institute of Geological Sciences.
- Gaby Hoffmann as Kelly Roark, Mike's daughter.
- Don Cheadle as Emmit Reese, the assistant director of the Office of Emergency Management, and Mike's associate.
- Jacqueline Kim as Dr. Jaye Calder, an emergency physician, and Norman's wife.
- Keith David as Edward "Ed" Fox, the police lieutenant of the Los Angeles Police Department.
- John Corbett as Norman Calder, a businessman, and Jaye's husband.
- Michael Rispoli as Gator Harris, Mike and Emmit's co-worker.
- John Carroll Lynch as Stan Olber, the chairman of the Regional Connector.
- Marcello Thedford as Kevin
- Laurie Lathem as Rachel
- Bert Kramer and Ron Perkins as Firefighting Chiefs
- Bo Eason as Bud McVie
- Dayton Callie as Roger Lapher, a supervisor for the Los Angeles Department of Water and Power.
- Michael Cutt as Armstrong
- Valente Rodriguez as Train Driver
- Susie Essman as Anita, Kelly's babysitter.
- Lou Myers as Pastor Lake
- Gareth Williams as Pete
- Mickey Cottrell as Councilman Gates
- Richard Schiff as Haskins
- Brian Markinson and Robert Wisdom as Staff Members of the Office of Emergency Management
- Mother Love as Traffic Cop
- Danny Comden as Cop
- Michael McGrady as Policeman
- Michole Briana White as Nurse

=== As themselves ===
- Harvey Levin
- Shepard Smith
- Jeremy Thompson
- Steve Edwards
- Chris Myers
- Charles Perez
- Jane Velez-Mitchell
- Dorothy Lucey
- Jillian Barberie
- Jane Wells
- Warren Olney IV

== Production ==
=== Filming ===
Filming was primarily on location in Los Angeles, California. Filming sites include MacArthur Park, Cedars-Sinai Medical Center and the La Brea Tar Pits. Extensive special effects surrounding aspects of the film such as the lava flow were created by ten separate digital effects companies, including VIFX, Digital Magic Company, Light Matters Inc., Pixel Envy, and Anatomorphex. An 80% full-size replica of Wilshire Boulevard, one of the largest sets ever constructed in the United States, was assembled in Torrance, California. The computer-generated imagery was coordinated and supervised by Dale Ettema and Mat Beck. Between visuals, miniatures, and animation, over 300 technicians were involved in the production aspects of the special effects.

=== Music ===
The score was originally composed and conducted by Alan Silvestri and performed by the Hollywood Studio Symphony. Recording artists James Newton Howard and Dillinger contributed songs to the music listing. The audio soundtrack on CD featuring 8 tracks was released by Varèse Sarabande on April 22, 1997. The sound effects were supervised by Christopher Boyes. The mixing of the sound elements were orchestrated by Jim Tanenbaum and Dennis Sands.

== Reception ==
Among mainstream critics in the US, Volcano received mixed reviews. Rotten Tomatoes reports that 49% of 47 sampled critics gave the film a positive review, with an average score of 5.10/10. The website's critical consensus reads, "Volcano's prodigious pyrotechnics and Tommy Lee Jones' crotchety sneers at lava aren't quite enough to save this routine disaster film." At Metacritic, which assigns a weighted average using critical reviews, the film received a score of 55 out of 100 based on 22 reviews, indicating "mixed or average reviews". Audiences polled by CinemaScore gave the film an average grade of "B+" on an A+ to F scale. In 1997, the film was nominated for a Golden Raspberry Award for Worst Reckless Disregard for Human Life and Public Property, but lost to Con Air at the 18th Golden Raspberry Awards.

The ads say The Coast Is Toast, but maybe they should say The Volcano Is Drano. This is a surprisingly cheesy disaster epic. It's said that Volcano cost a lot more than Dante's Peak, a competing volcano movie released two months ago, but it doesn't look it. Dante's Peak had better special effects, a more entertaining story, and a real mountain.
—Roger Ebert, writing in the Chicago Sun-Times

Janet Maslin wrote in The New York Times, "Volcano begins so excitably and hurtles so quickly into fiery pandemonium" but "in the disaster realm, it's not easy to have it all. A film this technically clever can't get away with patronizing and familiar genre clichés." Roger Ebert in the Chicago Sun-Times called the film a "surprisingly cheesy disaster epic" while musing, "The lava keeps flowing for much of the movie, never looking convincing. I loved it when the firemen aimed their hoses way offscreen into the middle of the lava flow, instead of maybe aiming them at the leading edge of the lava—which they couldn't do, because the lava was a visual effect, and not really there." In the San Francisco Chronicle, Mick LaSalle wrote that "Things go bad after Volcano plays its last card—the lava—and from there it has nothing to show but more of the same." Owen Gleiberman of Entertainment Weekly said, "Volcano is cheese, all right, but it's tangy cheese. I'm not sure I've ever seen a disaster movie in which special effects this realistic and accomplished were put to the service of a premise this outlandish."

Walter Addiego of the San Francisco Examiner opined that "Volcano offers a bit of humor, a minimum of plot distraction and the joys of watching molten rock ooze down Wilshire Boulevard." Equally impressed was James Berardinelli of ReelViews. He described Tommy Lee Jones' character Mike Roark as "a wonderfully heroic figure—a man of action who never has time to rest. The fate of the city rests on his shoulders, and he knows it." He added: "Volcano has opened the 'summer' movie season at an astoundingly early late-April date... This isn't the kind of film where it's worth waiting for the video tape—it's too big and brash, and demands the speakers and atmosphere of a state-of-the-art theater." Kenneth Turan of the Los Angeles Times wrote that the film "glows with heat. Lava heat. The coast may be toast, but it's the lava, covering everything like a malevolent tide of melted butter, that makes this a disaster picture that's tastier than usual."

For Time Out, TCh wrote, "The most striking aspect of this fun, old-fashioned disaster movie is the novelty of seeing the most familiar of backdrops used as a creative resource in its own right." For The Cincinnati Enquirer, Margaret McGurk wrote that the high-caliber special effects were "still fun, but all this lock-step storytelling is wearing thin", but added, "On its own escapist terms, Volcano dishes up a textbook serving of low-I.Q., high-energy entertainment." Marc Savlov of The Austin Chronicle called Volcano a "laughably ridiculous take on what we all secretly dream of: Los Angeles, washed away in a huge, molten tide of cheese—uh, lava, I mean." He added, "Screenwriters Jerome Armstrong and Billy Ray have crammed the script with...reams of very, very bad dialogue. So bad, in fact, that the screening audience I viewed Volcano with seemed to enjoy it immensely, hooting and hollering and laughing as though it were an old episode of Mystery Science Theater 3000."

Rita Kempley of The Washington Post wondered why "there's no volcano in "Volcano"?...The hokey disaster drama features towering plumes of smoke, a splendid display of fireworks and brimstone, and rivers of molten magma, but I'll be darned if there's a burning mountain." Todd McCarthy of Variety wrote, "first-time screenwriters Jerome Armstrong and Billy Ray waste no time with exposition or scene-setting, starting the fireworks with a nerve-jangling morning earthquake that puts city workers on alert for possible damage."

=== Box office ===
Volcano premiered in cinemas on April 25, 1997. At its widest distribution in the United States, the film was screened at 2,777 theaters. The film grossed $14,581,740 in box office business in Canada and the United States on its opening weekend, averaging $5,256 in revenue per theater. During that first weekend in release, the film opened in first place beating out the films Romy & Michelle's High School Reunion and Anaconda. The film's revenue dropped by 37% in its second week of release, earning $9,099,743. In the month of June during its final weekend showing in theaters, the film came out in 12th place grossing $602,076. The film went on to top out in the United States and Canada at $49,323,468 in total ticket sales through a 7-week theatrical run. In other markets, the film took in an additional $73,500,000 in box office business for an international total of $122,800,000. For 1997 as a whole, the film would cumulatively rank at a box office performance position of 39.

=== Home media ===
Following its cinematic release in theaters, the film was released in VHS video format on May 26, 1998. The Region 1 Code widescreen edition of the film was released on DVD in the United States on March 9, 1999. Special features for the DVD include interactive menus, scene selection and the original theatrical trailer. It is not enhanced for widescreen televisions, though the international DVD releases do. The film was released on Blu-ray Disc on October 1, 2013, by Starz/Anchor Bay.

== See also ==
- 1980 eruption of Mount St. Helens
- 2018 lower Puna eruption
- Mount Pinatubo
- Galeras tragedy
- Survival film
- Dante's Peak - another volcano-based film released in 1997
