= Dante's Peak =

1997 film by Roger Donaldson

- Theatrical release poster
- Directed by: Roger Donaldson
- Written by: Leslie Bohem
- Produced by: Gale Anne Hurd; Joseph Singer
- Starring: Pierce Brosnan; Linda Hamilton; Charles Hallahan
- Cinematography: Andrzej Bartkowiak
- Edited by: Conrad Buff IV; Tina Hirsch; Howard E. Smith
- Music by: James Newton Howard; John Frizzell
- Production company: Pacific Western Productions
- Distributed by: Universal Pictures
- Release date: February 7, 1997
- Running time: 108 minutes
- Country: United States
- Language: English
- Budget: $115–116 million
- Box office: $178.2 million

Dante's Peak is a 1997 American disaster action film starring Pierce Brosnan, Linda Hamilton, and Charles Hallahan. Set in the fictional town of Dante's Peak, its inhabitants fight to survive the eruption of a long-dormant stratovolcano that had recently become active. The film was directed by Roger Donaldson and written by Leslie Bohem.

Dante's Peak was released in the United States on February 7, 1997, by Universal Pictures. It received mixed reviews from critics and grossed $178 million worldwide.

== Plot ==
In 1993, USGS volcanologist Harry Dalton and his partner-turned-fiancée Marianne attempt to escape an ongoing eruption in Colombia. As they venture out, a lava bomb smashes through the roof of the truck, killing Marianne.

Four years later Harry is assigned by his superior, Dr. Paul Dreyfus, to investigate seismic activity near the town of Dante's Peak, Washington, which borders a stratovolcano. Harry meets Mayor Rachel Wando with her children, Graham and Lauren. Rachel offers to take Harry with them as they see her former mother-in-law Ruth, an elderly hermit who lives near the lake at the base of the volcano.

While exploring, they find dead trees, dead squirrels and a couple of tourists boiled to death in a hot spring. Harry stops Graham from jumping into the spring upon seeing the bodies. Harry instructs Paul to bring a USGS team to monitor the volcano, but their initial survey finds no indications of volcanic activity. Paul advises against Harry putting the town on alert. Still, Harry tries to convince Rachel to prepare for a disaster.

One day, Harry examines the summit's crater until a rock slide traps his co-worker Terry, causing him to suffer a broken leg. Both men are rescued by a helicopter. A week goes by with no volcanic activity Paul decides that their job is finished, and the USGS team prepares to leave. When Harry says goodbye to Rachel, they discover that the town's water supply has been contaminated with sulfur dioxide. The following day, seismic readings and sulfur levels rise dramatically. Convinced that the volcano will erupt and with the National Guard unavailable until the next day, Paul permits Harry to put the town on alert.

As a town meeting occurs at the high school, an earthquake strikes, and the eruption begins. Harry and Rachel retrieve the children, but they discover that they have gone to get Ruth, who refused to leave her home. Just as they reach the children and Ruth, a lava flow engulfs her cabin and destroys the vehicles both parties used to get there. The five attempt to flee across the lake in a motorboat, but sulfur-containing volcanic gases react with the lake water to make sulfuric acid, which destroys the motor and corrodes the boat's steel hull, sinking it just meters from the shoreline. Ruth jumps out of the boat to help it to shore, suffering fatal chemical burns in the process. After Ruth dies, Harry and the Wandos take a truck from the ranger's station to continue down the mountain and save Ruth's dog Roughy while crossing a lava flow.

Meanwhile, the National Guard helps the remaining townspeople and the USGS team evacuate. As they leave, a lahar created by the melting ice breaks the upstream dam. While the rest of the team makes it across, Paul and his van fail to clear the bridge before it is washed away by the flood, throwing Paul overboard to his death.

Harry and the Wandos arrive at the remains of the town. Harry retrieves a distress radio beacon from the USGS workshop and learns from a laptop that the volcano is due for one last eruption. The volcano then undergoes a cataclysmic lateral blast, triggering a pyroclastic flow which obliterates everything in its path. With no way out of town, Harry and the Wandos reach an abandoned mine where Graham likes to hang out. Watching the eruption from afar, the USGS team presumes Harry to be dead. Back inside the mine, Harry realizes he left the beacon in the truck. When he goes back for it, aftershocks cause rocks to fall. Harry suffers a broken arm and is trapped in the truck, but he still manages to activate the beacon.

Days later, Terry notices that the beacon has been activated, and the USGS dispatches search and rescue teams. Harry and the Wandos are freed from the mine, reunited with Harry's team, and airlifted out by helicopter. As the credits roll, the camera pans over to the volcano, showing its upper half has been reduced to a Mount St. Helens–like volcanic crater.

== Cast ==
- Pierce Brosnan as Harry Dalton, a volcanologist for the USGS
- Linda Hamilton as Rachel Wando, the mayor of Dante's Peak
- Charles Hallahan as Paul Dreyfus, Harry's superior
- Grant Heslov as Greg, a member of the USGS
- Kirk Trutner as Terry, a member of the USGS
- Elizabeth Hoffman as Ruth, Rachel's former mother-in-law. This was Hoffman's final film role before her retirement one year later.
- Jeremy Foley as Graham Wando, Rachel's older son
- Jamie Renée Smith as Lauren Wando, Rachel's younger daughter
- Arabella Field as Nancy, a member of the USGS
- Tzi Ma as Stan, a member of the USGS
- Lee Garlington as Dr. Jane Fox
- Bill Bolender as Sheriff Turner, the sheriff of Dante's Peak
- Peter Jason as Norman Gates
- Jeffrey L. Ward as Jack Collins
- Hansford Rowe as Warren Cluster, the manager and proprietor of the motel "Cluster's Last Stand"
- Christopher Murray as a helicopter pilot
- Walker Brandt as Marianne, Harry's first lover who died in the film's prologue

== Production ==
Principal photography began on May 6, 1996. The film was shot on location in Wallace, Idaho. Exterior shots of the Point Dume Post Office in Malibu, California, were used as the USGS's David A. Johnston Cascades Volcano Observatory headquarters in Vancouver, Washington. The facility was named in honor of David A. Johnston, a young scientist who had precisely predicted the volatility of the May 18, 1980 Mount St. Helens eruption and perished during the event. Sandra Bullock was initially considered for the role of Rachel Wando, but turned it down.

The scene involving the geological robot and the trapped scientist was shot inside the crater of Mount St. Helens, as evinced by a brief appearance of Mount Adams, a dormant 12,776-foot (3,894 m) peak 35 miles (56 km) east of Mount St. Helens, as the film focuses on the scientists. The scene itself was actually filmed on the tarmac of Van Nuys Airport, while the Mount Adams image was composited in later. While production of Air Force One took place in some of the airport's hangars on one side of the runway at the same time, the film crew occupied four buildings on the other side, two shooting stages and an additional two hangars. Production was completed on August 31, 1996.

=== Visual effects and animation ===
Digital Domain was the film's main visual effects and animation vendor, with Pat McClung serving as the studio's visual effects supervisor. The company simultaneously worked on the visual effects for Dante's Peak and two other 1997 films, The Fifth Element and Titanic.

=== Locations ===
- Wallace, Idaho (the fictional town)
- Old Coeur d'Alene River Road by Albert's Landing, Kingston, Idaho (the bridge)
- Mirror Lake, 4 miles (6.4 km) southeast of Sagle, Idaho (Grandma Ruth's lakeside house)
- Baker Hot Springs, Mount Baker National Forest, Washington
- Mount St. Helens National Volcanic Monument, Washington (establishing shots)
- Agua Dulce, California
- Point Dume Post Office, Malibu, California (USGS's David A. Johnston Cascades Volcano Observatory headquarters)

== Music ==
The original score was composed by both James Newton Howard and John Frizzell. Howard wrote the main theme (heard during the opening titles) and a number of cues, while Frizzell wrote the bulk of the score.

Originally, Howard was set to compose the film's score by himself, but due to scheduling issues, he hired Frizzell to pick up where he left off and finish the rest of the score. During that time, Frizzell was a fairly new film composer, as he had recently worked on a few films such as Alien Resurrection and Beavis and Butt-Head Do America. Dante's Peak marked the second collaboration between Howard and Frizzell, following The Rich Man's Wife the previous year.

Thirty minutes of the score was released by Varèse Sarabande; the short album length being due to high orchestra fees at the time of release. An extended bootleg exists that contains almost the entire score. In 2021, Varèse Sarabande released a deluxe edition that contains the entire complete score and some alternates.

The contents of the CD release can also be found on the region 1 DVD, and Blu-ray on an alternate audio track during the Creating a Volcano documentary.

The "Main Titles" cue is also featured on Varèse's The Towering Inferno and Other Disaster Classics compilation album.

Dante's Peak: Original Motion Picture Soundtrack
No.	Title	Length
1.	"Main Titles"	5:30
2.	"The Close Call"	1:49
3.	"Trapped in the Crater"	5:03
4.	"On the Porch"	2:31
5.	"The Evacuation Begins"	4:12
6.	"The Helicopter Crash"	1:28
7.	"Escaping the Burning House"	2:32
8.	"Sinking on Acid Lake"	2:37
9.	"Stuck in the Lava"	1:44
10.	"The Rescue"	3:05
Total length:		30:22

== Release ==
=== Marketing ===
To promote the release of Dante's Peak, the Studio Tour at Universal Studios Hollywood was updated with new theming and props from the film. More notably, the Glacier Avalanche rotating tunnel would be rethemed to the film, adding molten lava inside the mines. This addition would last for four years until 2001 when Curse of the Mummy's Tomb took over in conjunction with the release of The Mummy Returns.

=== Theatrical ===
Dante's Peak was initially set to be released theatrically on March 7, 1997, while its rival Volcano was scheduled to open the previous week on February 28. In late 1996, the film's release date was moved up to February 7, 1997. It opened on that day alongside Paramount's The Beautician and the Beast.

=== Home media ===
Dante's Peak was released on VHS and LaserDisc on August 19, 1997.

== Reception ==
=== Box office ===
The film was released on February 7, 1997, in 2,657 theaters. It debuted at #2 at the box office behind the special edition re-release of Star Wars; it took in $18 million in its opening weekend.

The film concluded with $67.2 million domestically, and $111 million overseas, for a worldwide total of $178.2 million. It was produced on a budget of $115–116 million.

For its opening weekend in the UK, Dante's Peak ranked third behind Star Wars and Space Jam with $1.5 million. In South Korea, the film earned $776,000 from 30 locations during its opening, marking an improvement over Twister. It ranked in second place behind 101 Dalmatians in France, making an opening gross $2 million.

=== Critical reception ===
On the review aggregator website Rotten Tomatoes, 34% of 35 critics' reviews are positive, with an average rating of 5.2/10. The website's consensus reads: "The movie works when things are on fire, but everything else - from dialogue to characters - is scathingly bad." Metacritic, which uses a weighted average, assigned the film a score of 43 out of 100, based on 21 critics, indicating "mixed or average" reviews. Audiences polled by CinemaScore gave the film an average grade of "A−" on an A+ to F scale.

Both Siskel and Ebert had mixed feelings about the film. Gene Siskel gave it two and a half stars out of four and wrote, "It takes a full hour for the volcano to blow in Dante's Peak, and when it does, the movie really starts to cook. The special effects of rivers of lava, snowstorms of volcanic ash and a river of acid water are top-notch. Can I recommend half of a movie?" Roger Ebert also gave the film two and a half stars out of four and wrote, "Dante's Peak is constructed about as skillfully as a disaster movie can be, and there were times when I found it working for me, sort of. But hasn't this genre pretty much been played out to the point of exhaustion?"

Caroline Westbrook of Empire said, "This is yet another one of those mindlessly enjoyable outings which eschews such unimportant details as plot or characterisation in favour of the biggest, flashiest special effects money can buy. Twister with lava, if you will." Eric Brace for The Washington Post stated that "Dante's Peak is predictable from start to finish, but the video-game style action and effects never let up long enough for you to remember how absurd it all is. It's a blast." Liam Lacey of The Globe and Mail explained that "director Roger Donaldson (Smash Palace, No Way Out, Species), working from a script by Leslie Bohem (Daylight), does a serviceable job, wrapping his narrative around the big kabooms, but the real interest comes from the extraordinary barrage of sound and spectacle."

=== Geologists' reception and educational purpose ===
The film attracted geologists to create dedicated "information pages" to reach out to students interested in science, including the U.S. Geological Survey (USGS) and the University of Maryland. The fact-checking on USGS's information page concluded "in many but not all respects, the movie's depiction of eruptive hazards hits close to the mark". On the other hand, two professors at the Lewis-Clark State College panned the movie for understating the negative effects of a possible false alarm. The film is also a popular film for viewing and discussion in science classes in the United States.

== Accolades ==
Hamilton won Favorite Actress – Action/Adventure at the Blockbuster Entertainment Awards while both Foley and Smith has won the Young Artist Awards. Howard also received the award for Top Box Office Films at the ASCAP Film and Television Music Awards for his work on My Best Friend's Wedding and Dante's Peak, with the latter being shared by Frizzell. The film was nominated for best foreign film at the Golden Rooster Awards.

== See also ==
- 1980 eruption of Mount St. Helens
- 2018 lower Puna eruption
- Mount Pinatubo
- Galeras tragedy
- Survival film
- Volcano – another volcano-based film released in 1997
