= Christine Lane =

British geographer

- Born: 9 September 1980 (age 45)
- Education: Cardiff University; Royal Holloway, University of London (MSc); University of Oxford (DPhil)
- Scientific career
- Fields: Quaternary science; Tephrochronology
- Workplaces: University of Oxford; University of Manchester; University of Cambridge
- Website: www.geog.cam.ac.uk/people/lane/

Christine Susanna Lane (born 9 September 1980) is a physical geographer and Quaternary researcher. She has held the Professor of Geography (1993) chair in the University of Cambridge, Department of Geography since 2016.

== Education ==
Christine Lane was educated at Cardiff University where she was awarded a Bachelor of Science degree in Geology. She then went on to earn a MSc in Quaternary Science from Royal Holloway, University of London. Following her masters, she moved to Oxford to help establish the Cryptotephra Laboratory at the Research Laboratory for Archaeology and the History of Art (RLAHA), University of Oxford, part of the Royal Holloway and Oxford Tephrochronology Research group (RHOXTOR). Lane subsequently undertook a DPhil at the University of Oxford, after which she spent three years as a postdoctoral research assistant on the RESET Project.

In 2012 Lane was awarded a Leverhulme Trust Early Career Fellowship, looking at the tephra records of East African changing environments, during which she moved from RLAHA to the Department of Geography at the University of Manchester. She was awarded the Professor of Geography (1993) chair and moved to the University of Cambridge in 2016.

== Career and research ==
Lane's work researches the mechanisms, timing and environmental impacts of past climatic change and explosive volcanism, primarily in East Africa and Europe.

In 2013 Lane was involved in a project which sought to examine the impacts of the Toba supereruption in Africa using a sediment core from Lake Malawi. The team were able to identify ash from the eruption, dated to 75,000 years before present, in the lake sediment, however found no evidence of the volcanic winter previously hypothesised.
