= Thorarinsson Medal =

Volcanology award

Thorarinsson Medal

The Thorarinsson Medal is awarded every four years by the International Association of Volcanology and Chemistry of the Earth's Interior (IAVCEI) for outstanding contributions to the general field of volcanology, and is the highest award given by IAVCEI. It is named for the Icelandic geologist and volcanologist Sigurdur Thorarinsson (Sigurður Þórarinsson) (1912–1983).

== Medalists ==
- 1987 Robert L. Smith (USA)
- 1989 George P. L. Walker (UK)
- 1993 Hans U. Schmincke (Germany)
- 1997 Richard V. Fisher (USA)
- 2000 Keiiti Aki (USA/France)
- 2004 Wes Hildreth (USA)
- 2008 Robert Stephen John Sparks (UK)
- 2013 Barry Voight (USA)
- 2017 Bruce Houghton (New Zealand/USA)
- 2023 Katharine Cashman
- 2025 Lionel Wilson

== See also ==
- List of geology awards
- Prizes named after people
