= Richard Virgil Fisher =

American volcanologist (1928–2002)

- Born: August 8, 1928
- Died: June 8, 2002 (aged 73)
- Education: Occidental College (BSc) University of Washington (PhD)
- Awards: N.L. Bowen award (1985) Thorarinsson Medal (1997)
- Scientific career
- Workplaces: University of California, Santa Barbara
- Doctoral students: Grant Heiken

Richard Virgil Fisher (August 8, 1928 – June 8, 2002), also known as R.V., was an American volcanologist and Professor of Geology at University of California, Santa Barbara.

== Early life ==
Fisher was born in Whittier, California in 1928. He left High School to join the US Army in 1946, and was assigned to the Los Alamos National Laboratory, New Mexico, but then volunteered for duty at Bikini Atoll, in the Pacific. He was present onboard USS Haven for the first two nuclear tests at Bikini atoll: Able, on 1 July, 1946, which was an air blast; and Baker, on 25 July 1946, which was a submarine detonation. His observations of nuclear-test explosions provided him with insights that he would later use for interpreting the processes and products of explosive volcanic eruptions, particularly those involving interactions with water.

== Education ==
After leaving the army, Fisher began his university studies at Occidental College in 1948. He was a beneficiary of the G I Bill, which provided educational benefits to army veterans. He entered as a music major, but switched to geology after a term, and graduated in 1952 with a B.S. in geology. He went straight on to graduate work at the University of Washington in Seattle, and in 1957 completed a Ph.D. on the Oligocene volcanic and sedimentary strata southwest of Mount Rainier. Fisher's work on these rocks led to a series of published papers on the definition, classification and interpretations of volcanic breccia, which still provide the foundation for research in this area.

== Career ==
In 1955, Fisher took up a faculty position in geology at the new Santa Barbara campus of the University of California. He remained there for his whole career, where he taught generations of undergraduate students, and advised many graduate students and post-doctoral researchers in volcanology. During his tenure, Fisher was chair of the Department of Geological Sciences three times (1969-73, 1979-80, and 1983-84). He was also assistant to the chancellor for Academic Planning (1972-73). Fisher retired in December 1992.

== Research ==
Over the course of his career, Fisher made many original contributions to the field of pyroclastic geology, and volcanism. In his early work on maar volcanoes, and the nature of hydrovolcanic eruptions, Fisher proposed that the interaction of hot magma with surface water would form a violent, expanding ash cloud that he called a ‘base surge’; analogous to features he had witnessed during the nuclear explosions at Bikini Atoll. This led to a considerable body of work around the world, on the transport and deposition of pyroclastic rocks from density currents (PDCs). Fisher published many papers through his career. He also published several books, for both popular and scientific audiences. The first was Pyroclastic Rocks, co-authored with Hans-Ulrich Schmincke and published in 1984. In 1991, Fisher and Allen published Sedimentation in Volcanic Settings. His third book, Volcanoes - Crucibles of Change was a trade book, published in 1997 and was followed in 1999 by his autobiography Out of the Crater - Chronicles of a Volcanologist.

== Selected books ==
- Fisher, Richard V.; Schmincke, Hans-Ulrich (1984). Pyroclastic Rocks. doi:10.1007/978-3-642-74864-6. ISBN 978-3-540-51341-4.
- Fisher, Richard V.; Smith, Gary A., eds. (1991). Sedimentation in Volcanic Settings. doi:10.2110/pec.91.45. ISBN 0-918985-89-7.
- Fisher, Richard V.; Heiken, Grant (1997). Volcanoes: Crucibles of Change. Princeton University Press. ISBN 978-0-691-00249-1.
- Fisher, Richard V. (2000). Out of the Crater: Chronicles of a Volcanologist. Princeton University Press. ISBN 978-0-691-07017-9.

== Recognition ==
Fisher’s research contributions were recognised during his life with a number of awards and prizes, including two Senior Scientist Awards (1980-81, 1988-89) from the Alexander von Humboldt Foundation; the N.L. Bowen Award of the American Geophysical Union in 1985, and the Thorarinsson Medal of IAVCEI in 1997.

In 2017, IAVCEI made the first award of the Fisher Medal, named in his honour. This medal recognises scientists who have 'made outstanding contributions to volcanology based primarily upon field observations', reflecting Fisher's research in this area.

== Family ==
In 1947, he married Beverly Taylor. They had four children.
