= Galeras tragedy =

1993 eruption of a volcano in Colombia

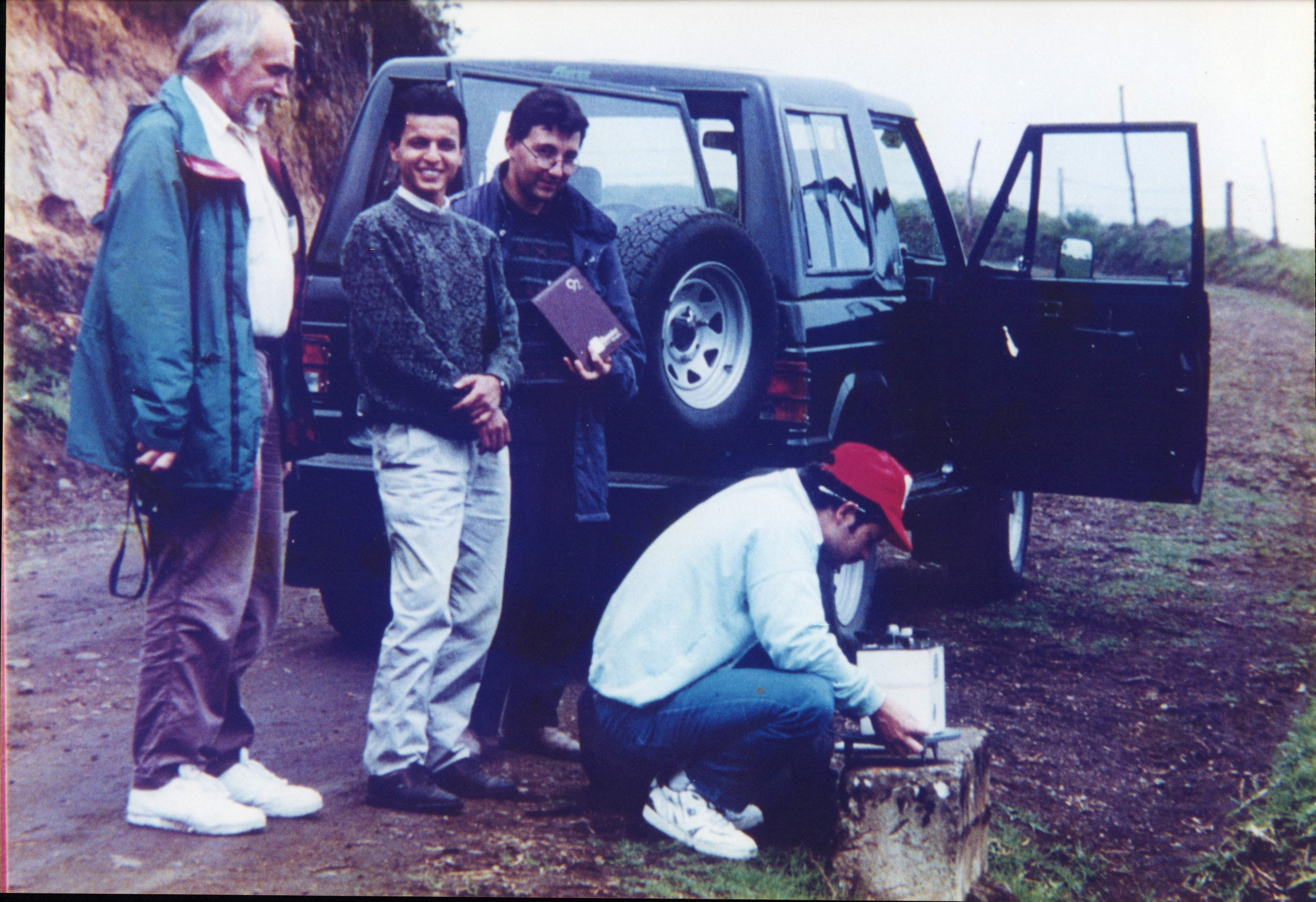
Geologists and volcanologists making preparations at the Galeras stratovolcano hours before the eruption.

The Galeras tragedy occurred when six scientists and three tourists were killed as a result of the January 1993 eruption of the Galeras stratovolcano in Colombia. Geologist Stanley Williams and six others on the volcano survived.

== Background ==
The scientists were at Galeras to collect monitoring data about its levels of activity—including collecting some of the gases, and looking for tiny changes in the gravity field. They were attending a conference in Pasto organized by the United Nations to gather geologists to study Galeras in order to assess its potential threat to nearby population. Past research had determined that Galeras would probably erupt again in the future, possibly endangering Pasto's population of approximately 300,000 people and another 400,000 living in the vicinity of the volcano. Shortly after 1 pm on 14 January 1993, there was an explosion in the summit crater without warning. At that time, there were about 12 people in or around the crater. Nine people were killed outright in the explosions. Six were volcanologists: Geoff Brown, from the U.K.; Igor Menyailov, a Russian; and Fernando Cuenco, Carlos Trujillo, Nestor Garcia and José Arlés Zapata from Colombia. Other volcanologists who had been involved in the same conference, and were on other parts of the volcano at the time, saw the explosion from a distance and became involved in the rescue. Among those who helped to rescue the workshop leader, Stan Williams, and the other casualties were Marta Calvache, then director of the Galeras Volcano Observatory in Pasto; and Patty Mothes, an American volcanologist based at IG-EPN, Quito.

== Legacy ==
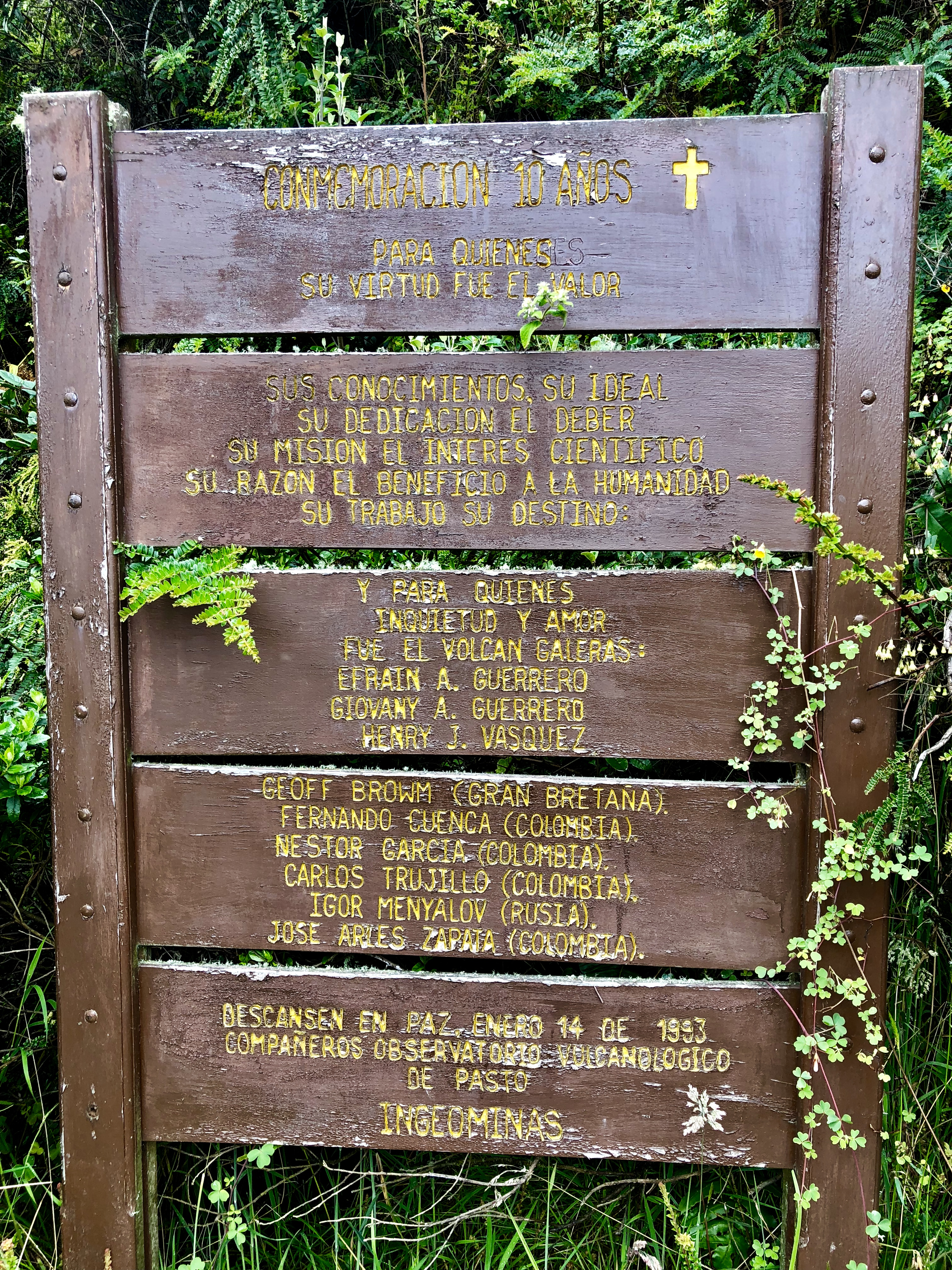
A sign posted at the site.

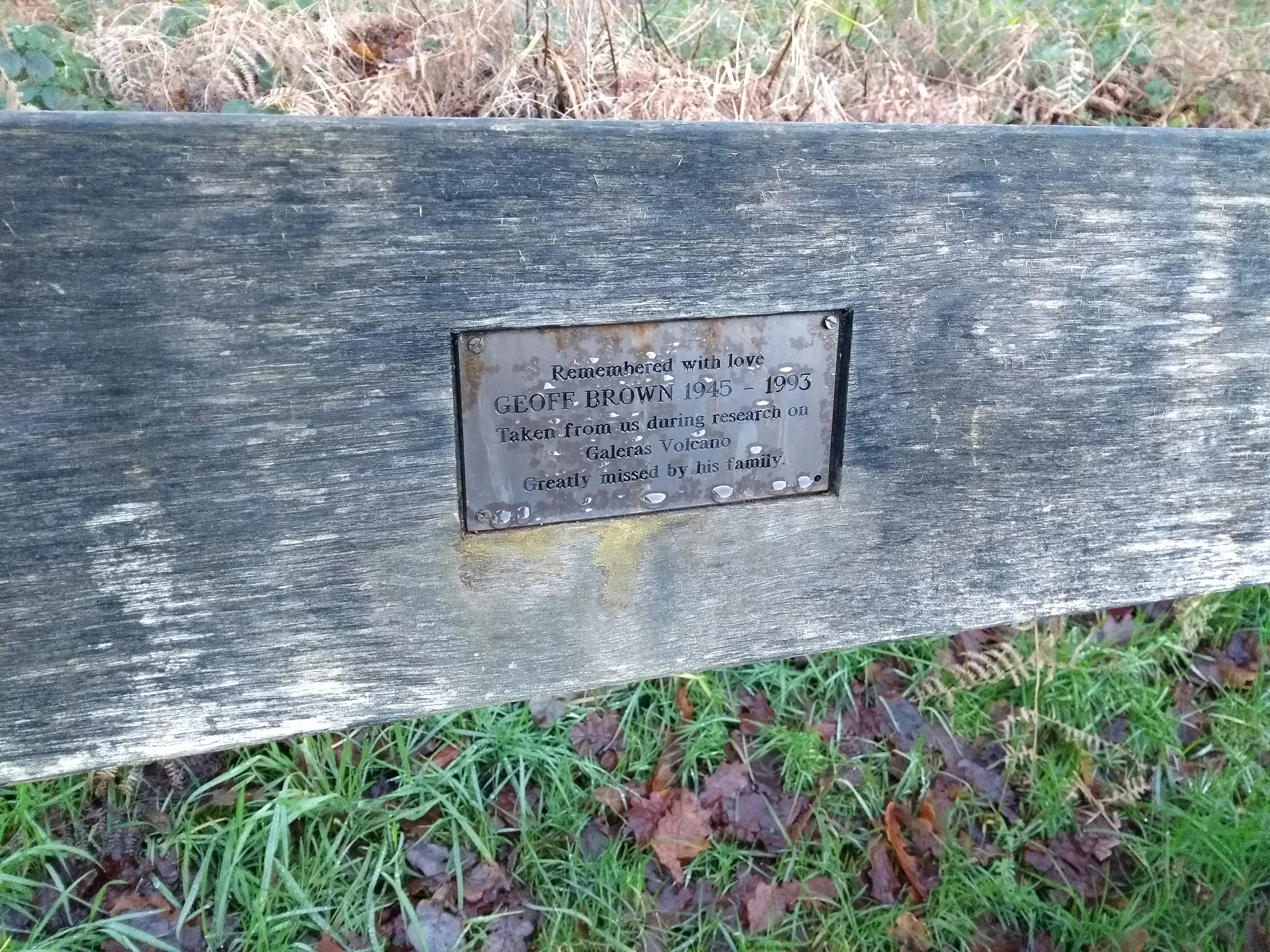
Memorial bench commemorating Geoff Brown, a victim of the Galeras volcano tragedy, at Beacon Hill, Charnwood, Leicestershire

At the time of the eruption, most predictions were made similarly to the one before the 1980 eruption of Mount St. Helens—that a volcano would erupt, but not specifying an exact time. C. Dan Miller of the United States Geological Survey remarked:

We're able to do a much better job of monitoring the changes that occur at volcanoes as they wake up, but we are still quite a long ways from being able to forecast the time, the magnitude and the character of an eruption.

Since the disaster, research has improved scientists' ability to predict volcanic eruptions. Still, there is not a definite method of prediction. Though scientists were able to make accurate analysis by employing long-period earthquakes, short bursts of seismic energy, to forecast the 1990 eruption of Mount Redoubt in Alaska, these events are known also to occur at volcanoes that do not erupt. In early October 2004, for example, long-period events took place at Mount St. Helens, only to precede insignificant events. One lasting and tangible outcome of the tragedy was a set of recommendations concerning safety equipment and clothing that should be used when working on active volcanoes, for example, hard hats and fire-proof coveralls.
