= 1879 AAC Championships =

Outdoor track and field competition

- Dates: 7 April 1879; 14/16 June 1879
- Host city: London, England
- Venue: Lillie Bridge Grounds; Stamford Bridge Running Grounds
- Level: Senior
- Type: Outdoor

The 1879 AAC Championships were two outdoor track and field competitions organised by the Amateur Athletic Club (AAC) and London Athletic Club (LAC). The first was the usual annual AAC championships, held at the Lillie Bridge Grounds on 7 April 1879.

A second championships was organised in the Summer of 1879 to allow for the growing demand of club athletes to compete. Previously the championships in March were organised largely to suit the availality of university athletes.

The Summer Championships were held on Saturday 14 June and Monday 16 June 1879 at the Stamford Bridge Running Grounds in England.

== Summary ==
In addition to each event winner receiving a medal, the prizes included several valuable cups presented on an annual basis:

- A 60-Guinea Cup for the 4 miles race donated by Earl of Jersey
- A 100-Guinea Cup for the 100 yards race donated by Prince Hassam
- A 50-Guinea Cup for the 1 mile race donated by Mr C. B. Lawes

== Results ==
=== Spring Championships ===
| Event | 1st | | | 2nd | | | 3rd | | |
|---|---|---|---|---|---|---|---|---|---|
| 100 yards | Melville R. Portal | Oxford UAC | 10.6 | Edgar Storey | Cambridge UAC | 1 ft | Edward L. Lucas | Cambridge UAC | 2 yd |
| 440 yards | Edgar Storey | Cambridge UAC | 51.4 | Melville R. Portal | Oxford UAC | 1 ft | Frederick W. Fellowes | Burton FC | 20 yd |
| 880 yards | William W. Bolton | Cambridge UAC | 2:03.6 | Lees Knowles | Cambridge UAC | 3 yd | Charles J. Johnstone | Cambridge UAC | 17 yd |
| 1 mile | (New South Wales) Bernhard Wise | Oxford UAC | 4:29.0 | Henry C. Jenkins | Oxford UAC | 15 yd | Charles J. Johnstone | Cambridge UAC | 100 yd |
| 4 miles | James E. Warburton | Stoke Victoria | 20:41.6 | James Harris | Middlesbrough BC | 22:15.6 | | | |
| 120yd hurdles | Samuel Palmer | Cambridge UAC | 17.4 | Charles Gilbert | Oxford UAC | 12 yd | only 2 competitors | | |
| 7 miles walk | Harry Webster | Stoke Victoria | 52:34.5 NR | n/a | | | only 1 competitor | | |
| high jump | Reginald Macauley | Cambridge UAC | 1.765 | Thomas Tomlinson | Denby | 1.689 | only 2 competitors | | |
| pole jump | Frederick H.W.D. Robinson | Beccles AC | 3.05 | n/a | | | only 1 competitor | | |
| long jump | William G. Elliott | Cambridge UAC | 6.36 | Stanley F. Prest | Durham ARC | 5.84 | only 2 competitors | | |
| shot put | Arthur H. East | Cambridge UAC | 11.47 | Henry W. Macauley | Cambridge UAC | 10.90 | only 2 competitors | | |

=== Summer Championships ===
| Event | 1st | | | 2nd | | | 3rd | | |
|---|---|---|---|---|---|---|---|---|---|
| 100 yards | Charles L. Lockton | London AC | 10.1–5 sec | Henry Allan | London AC | 2½ yd | Horace Crossley | London AC | close |
| 440 yards | Henry R. Ball | London AC | 51.8 | Sidney H. Baker | London AC | 1½ yd | Herbert H. Sturt | London AC | ½ yd |
| 880 yards | Charles Hazen-Wood | London AC | 2:01.3–5 sec | Neville Turner | London AC | 5 yd | William E. Pedley | RIEC | 15 yd |
| 1 mile | Walter George | Moseley Harriers | 4:26.6 | Samuel K. Holman | London AC | dnf | Charles Hazen-Wood | London AC | dnf |
| 4 miles | Walter George | Moseley Harriers | 20:52.2 | Charles H. Mason | London AC | dnf | W. Stevenson | London AC | dnf |
| 10 miles | Charles H. Mason | London AC | 56:31.6 | George E. Stanley | Spartan Harriers | 57:51.8 | C. F. Turner | Spartan Harriers | dnf |
| 120yd hurdles | Charles L. Lockton | London AC | 16.6 | Henry Allan | London AC | 2 yd | Francis J. W. Wood | London AC | 6 inches |
| steeplechase | Henry M. Oliver | LAC & Mosley Harriers | 11:49.2 | Charles L. O'Malley (Ireland) | LAC & Ilex SC | 70 yd | Robert S. Benson | Royal School of Mines | 100 yd |
| 7 miles walk | Harry Venn | London AC | 56:10.6 | n/a | | | only 1 competitor | | |
| high jump | Robert E. Thomas; William Hall | Liverpool Gymnasium; Bristol Ariel RC | 1.753 | n/a | | | Horace W. Strachan; Frank J. W. Wood | London AC; London AC | 1.664; 1,664 |
| long jump | Charles L. Lockton | London AC | 6.74 | Horace Crossley | London AC | 6.22 | Gerard Fowler | Birmingham AC | 6.02 |
| shot put | William Y. Winthrop | London AC | 12.01 | Robert E. Thomas | Liverpool Gymnasium | 10.77 | only 2 competitors | | |
| hammer throw | William A. Burgess | late Oxford UAC | 29.49 | William Y. Winthrop | London AC | 28.52 | only 2 competitors | | |
