= Grant Heiken =

American volcanologist (1942–2026)

- Born: October 11, 1942
- Died: October 11, 2026 (aged 84)
- Education: University of California, Berkeley (B.A.); University of Texas at Austin (M.A.); University of California, Santa Barbara (PhD)
- Scientific career
- Workplaces: NASA; Los Alamos National Laboratories
- Doctoral advisor: RV Fisher

Grant H. Heiken (October 11, 1942 – October 11, 2026) was an American volcanologist, who worked on volcanic processes and materials both on the moon and earth. He was president of the International Association of Volcanology and Chemistry of the Earth's Interior from 1995 to 1999.

== Life and career ==
Heiken studied at University of California, Berkeley for his bachelor's degree, and then took a master's degree at the University of Texas, Austin. He completed a PhD in volcanology at the University of California, Santa Barbara, under the supervision of volcanologist R V Fisher. Heiken was Fisher's first doctoral student, enrolled in UC Santa Barbara's new PhD degree programme; and his dissertation work focussed on the maar volcanoes of southern Oregon.

From 1969 to 1974, during the Apollo Program, Heiken worked for NASA, in the Lunar Receiving Laboratory. Here, he was a geology instructor for astronauts, and carried out research on lunar materials. In 1975 he moved to the Los Alamos National Laboratory in New Mexico, where he worked on volcanic hazards, geothermal exploration and continental scientific drilling, among other topics.

Over his career, Heiken wrote numerous books, both technical and for general audiences. He was the lead editor of Lunar Sourcebook—A User’s Guide to the Moon (Cambridge University Press, 1991) and co-author, with Eric Jones, of On the Moon—The Apollo Journals (Springer-Praxis, 2007). In a compilation of 'fifty books about the Moon', reviewer Ken Murphy rated Heiken's Lunar Sourcebook as his top choice, commenting that "This is the de facto base scientific reference work on the Moon". With Fisher, Heiken wrote Volcanoes: Crucibles of Change, in 1997. The Italian translation of his book The Seven Hills of Rome won an Italian literary prize in 2007: Il Premio dei Lettori di Biblioteche di Roma.

In his retirement, Heiken lived on Whidbey Island, Washington.

Heiken died on October 11, 2026, his 84th birthday, after a long illness with mesothelioma.

== Legacy ==
In 2017, Heiken and his wife established the Grant and Jody Heiken research grant in volcanology through the Geological Society of America. This provides grants for graduate student research in volcanology.

== Selected books ==
- Heiken, Grant (1974). Atlas of Volcanic Ash. Smithsonian Contributions to the Earth Sciences. Washington DC: Smithsonian Institution.
- Heiken, GH; Vaniman, D; French, BM (1991). The Lunar sourcebook: A user's guide to the Moon. Cambridge: Cambridge University Press. p. 693. ISBN 0-521-33444-6.
- Fisher, Richard V.; Heiken, Grant (1997). Volcanoes: Crucibles of Change. Princeton: Princeton University Press. ISBN 978-0-691-00249-1.
- Heiken, G; Funiciello, R; De Rita, D (2005). The Seven Hills of Rome: a Geological Tour of the Eternal City. Princeton: Princeton University Press. ISBN 0-691-06995-6.
- Heiken, Grant; Jones, Eric (2007). On the Moon: The Apollo Journals. Chichester, UK: Springer Praxis Books.
- Heiken, Grant (2013). Dangerous Neighbors: Volcanoes and Cities. Cambrige, UK: Cambridge University Press. ISBN 978-1-107-03923-0.
