= International Association of Volcanology and Chemistry of the Earth's Interior =

International non-governmental organization

- Abbreviation: IAVCEI
- Formation: 1919
- Type: International nongovernmental organization
- Region served: Worldwide
- Official language: English
- Parent organization: International Union of Geodesy and Geophysics
- Website: IAVCEI Official website

The International Association of Volcanology and Chemistry of the Earth's Interior (IAVCEI) is a learned society that focuses on research in volcanology, efforts to mitigate volcanic disasters, and research into closely related disciplines, such as igneous geochemistry and petrology, geochronology, volcanogenic mineral deposits, and the physics of the generation and ascent of magmas in the upper mantle and crust. It is one of eight constituent associations of the International Union of Geodesy and Geophysics (IUGG).

IAVCEI is run by an executive committee whose membership changes every four years. The Executive determines policies for the Association, enacting them through a series of commissions and task groups. The Bulletin of Volcanology is the journal of IAVCEI.

== History ==
The International Union of Geodesy and Geophysics, a non-governmental organisation, was established in 1919. The Volcanology section of the IUGG, also founded in 1919, was the forerunner of the IAVCEI. It was formally constituted at the First General Assembly of the IUGG (Rome, 1922). The name was changed to International Association of Volcanology (IAV) at the Fourth General Assembly of the IUGG (Stockholm, 1930). IAV statutes and by-laws were adopted in Helsinki in 1960 and were revised in Zurich in 1967 and in Canberra in 1979. The association's present name was adopted in 1967 in order to harmonise with the name of the International Association of Seismology and the Physics of the Earth's Interior (IASPEI).

== IAVCEI statutes and objectives ==
The statutes of IAVCEI include four objectives:

- To study scientific problems related to volcanoes and volcanic processes, past and present, and to the chemistry of the Earth's interior.
- To encourage, initiate and coordinate research, and promote international cooperation in these studies.
- To encourage volcanologists to alert appropriate authorities about the importance of adequate surveillance of active and potentially active volcanoes, and of volcanic risk assessment.
- To arrange for the discussion and publication of the results of scientific research on volcanology and on the chemistry of the Earth's interior.

Countries are members of IUGG. After 1996 individuals have been able to become members of IAVCEI.

== Publications ==
The Bulletin of Volcanology is the journal of IAVCEI. It is a continuation of the Bulletin Volcanologique, which began publication in 1922.

The association has published 22 volumes of the Catalogue of the Active Volcanoes of the World. The Catalogue was announced in 1924, and was begun in 1948 when the regional arrangement and format were established. The first volume, on Indonesia, was published in 1951, and the 22nd volume, on New Zealand, in 1967.

== Awards ==
- Thorarinsson Medal, in honor of Sigurdur Thorarinsson (1912–1983)
- Wager Medal, in honor of Lawrence Wager (1904–1965)
- Fisher Medal, in honor of Richard V. Fisher (1928-2002)
- Krafft Medal, in honor of Katia Krafft (1942–1991) and Maurice Krafft (1946–1991)
- George Walker Awards, in honor of George P. L. Walker (1926–2005)
- Honorary Membership

== Wager medal ==
The Wager medal is named for Professor Lawrence Wager of the University of Oxford, who died in 1965. The medal is given every two years to a 'mid-career' scientist, within 15 years of completion of their PhD. The award recognises individuals who have made outstanding contributions to volcanology, particularly in the eight-year period prior to the Award.

Wager Medallists

- 1974 Franco Barberi
- 1974 Jacques Varet
- 1978 Steve Sparks
- 1987 Charlie Bacon
- 1993 Colin Wilson
- 1993 Claude Jaupart
- 1998 Giovanni Macedonio
- 1998 Jon Davidson
- 2002 Andrew Woods
- 2002 James Gardner
- 2004 Andy Harris
- 2004 Oleg Melnik
- 2008 Joachim Gottsmann
- 2008 Alessandro Aiuppa
- 2011 Amanda Clarke
- 2013 Antonio Costa
- 2013 Fidel Costa
- 2015 Tommaso Esposti Ongaro
- 2015 Mattia de’ Michieli Vitturi
- 2017 Marie Edmonds
- 2017 Yan Lavallée
- 2019 Madeleine Humphreys
- 2023 Susanna Jenkins
- 2023 Yves Moussallam
- 2023 Michael J. Heap

== Fisher medal ==
The Fisher Medal is named for Richard V. Fisher of the University of California Santa Barbara, who died in 2002, in Santa Barbara, California. The medal is given every 4 years to a scientist who has made outstanding contributions to volcanology based primarily upon field observations.

Fisher medallists

- 2017 José Luis Macias Vasquez
- 2023 Karen Fontijn

== Krafft medal ==
The Krafft Medal is named for Katia and Maurice Krafft who were killed while filming on Mount Unzen, Japan in 1991. The Krafft Medal is awarded every 4 years to an individual who has made outstanding contributions to volcanology through service to the scientific community or to communities threatened by volcanic activity.

Krafft medallists

- 2004 Tom Simkin
- 2008 Christopher G. Newhall
- 2013 Shigeo Aramaki
- 2017 Hugo Delgado Granados
- 2017 Marta Calvache
- 2023 John Pallister

== George Walker award ==
The George Walker award is named for GPL Walker, who died in 2005. The award is given every two years to a scientist who is within 7 years of Ph.D. completion, and recognizes the achievements of a recent outstanding graduate in volcanology, or a recent graduate whose achievements in volcanology involved operating in difficult circumstances.

George Walker awardees

- 2004 Costanza Bonadonna
- 2008 Diana C. Roman
- 2008 Fukashi Maeno
- 2011 Josef Dufek
- 2013 Heather Wright
- 2015 Anja Schmidt
- 2017 Sébastien Biass
- 2017 Alexa Van Eaton
- 2019 Damien Gaudin
- 2019 Fabian Wadsworth
- 2023 Emma Nicholson
- 2023 Andrea Bevilacqua
- 2023 Thomas Jones

== Honorary members ==
Honorary Membership is bestowed on individuals who have made outstanding contributions to the volcanological community, and IAVCEI.

Honorary Members

- 2003 Hans-Ulrich Schmincke
- 2003 Shigeo Aramaki
- 2003 Robert Tilling
- 2008 Haraldur Sigurdsson
- 2008 Franco Barberi
- 2008 Wally Johnson
- 2013 Servando de la Cruz Reyna
- 2013 Sergei Fedotov
- 2013 Grant Heiken
- 2013 Izumi Yokoyama
- 2023 Ray Cas
- 2023 Marta Calvache
- 2023 Lionel Wilson
- 2023 Patty Mothes

== See also ==
- Volcano Number - a system developed for the Catalogue of the Active Volcanoes of the World
