= Colin Wilson (volcanologist) =

New Zealand volcanologist and educator

Colin Wilson FRS FRSNZ
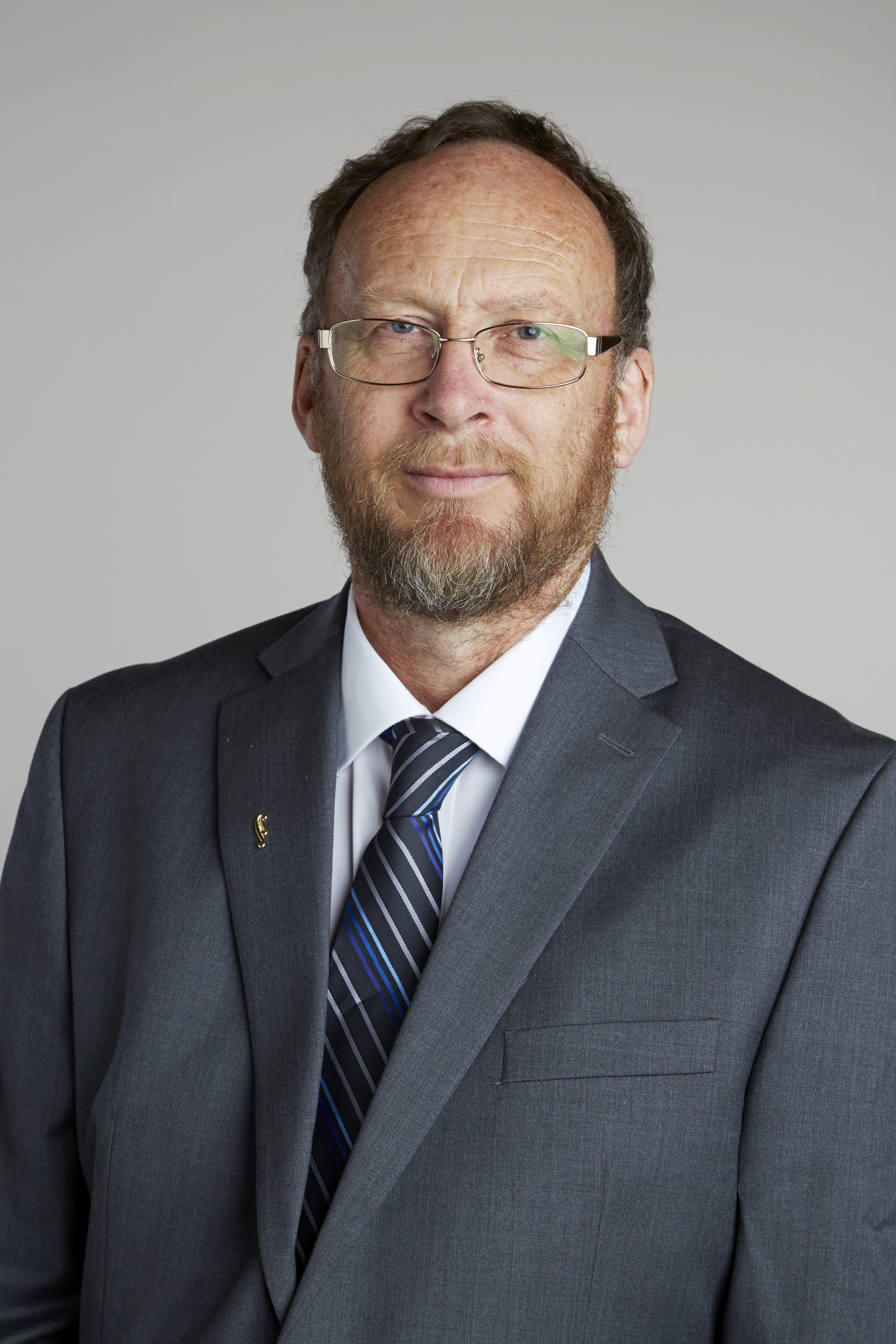
- Colin Wilson in 2015, portrait from the Royal Society
- Born: Colin James Ness Wilson; 19 July 1956 (age 70); Wantage, Oxfordshire
- Education: Imperial College London (BSc, PhD)
- Known for: Volcanology of New Zealand
- Awards: Rutherford Medal (2017); FRS (2015); Hutton Medal (2009); FRSNZ (2001); IAVCEI Wager Medal (1993)
- Scientific career
- Fields: Geology; Volcanology
- Workplaces: Victoria University of Wellington; University of Auckland; University of Cambridge; University of Bristol
- Thesis: Studies on the origins and emplacement of pyroclastic flows (1981)
- Website: victoria.ac.nz/sgees/about/staff/colin-wilson

Colin James Ness Wilson FRS FRSNZ (born 19 July 1956) is Professor of Volcanology at Victoria University of Wellington in New Zealand.

== Education ==
Wilson was educated at Imperial College London where he was awarded a Bachelor of Science degree in Geology in 1977 followed by a PhD in 1981 for research on pyroclastic flows.

== Awards and honours ==
Wilson was elected a Fellow of the Royal Society (FRS) in 2015. His certificate of election reads:

Colin Wilson is an outstanding field-focussed geologist, who has made world-class contributions to understanding explosive volcanism and crustal magmatism, based on uniquely detailed data sets gathered from historic and prehistoric eruption deposits. His studies of explosive volcanism, particularly the eruption and emplacement of pyroclastic flows and ignimbrites, have established many fundamental new ideas on large-scale hazardous volcanic activity and opened up new concepts in quantifying prehistoric eruptions. He has combined his field-focussed data with innovative analytical approaches in comprehensive studies of the dynamics of large ('super-eruption') silicic magma chambers in modern volcanoes. He is a recipient of the Wager Medal of the International Association of Volcanology and Chemistry of the Earth's Interior and was elected a Fellow of the Royal Society of New Zealand in 2001 and of the American Geophysical Union in 2006.

In 2017 he was awarded the Rutherford Medal of the Royal Society of New Zealand for his research on how large volcanoes behave before and during explosive eruptions, including those that created Lake Taupō.
