= Lionel Wilson (geophysicist) =

British volcanologist and planetary scientist

- Education: University of Birmingham (BSc, 1965); University College London (PhD, 1968)
- Awards: N.L. Bowen Award (1983); G. K. Gilbert Award (2005); Thorarinsson Medal (2025)
- Scientific career
- Fields: Volcanology
- Workplaces: Lancaster University
- Thesis: Interpretation of lunar photometry (1968)

Lionel Wilson is a British volcanologist, known for his studies of the physics of volcanic eruptions, and for his work on planetary volcanism. He was awarded the G.K. Gilbert Award of the Geological Society of America in 2005, and the Thorarinsson Medal of the International Association of Volcanology and Chemistry of the Earth's Interior in 2025.

== Early life and education ==
Wilson grew up in Wednesbury, in the West Midlands, and went to a local grammar school. His father worked in a local steel works. Wilson studied physics at the University of Birmingham from 1962 to 1965, graduating with a B.Sc degree. He then moved to the University of London Observatory in Mill Hill, to complete a doctoral degree on the photometry of the lunar surface. He completed his PhD in 1968. From 1968 to 1970, Wilson held a post-doctoral fellowship funded by the Science Research Council at the University of London. In 1970, Wilson took up a lectureship at Lancaster University.

== Career ==
Wilson’s early work was on the nature of the surface of the Moon and in 1969, he was one of three commentators on the BBC live broadcast of the moon landing of Apollo 11, alongside BBC science correspondent Arthur Garrett and engineer Eric Burnett. Their broadcast began on the evening of July 20th, as the lunar lander descended, and continued for about 24 hours. Wilson subsequently appeared several times on the British television documentary show on astronomy, The Sky at Night, with Patrick Moore and Maggie Aderin-Pocock.

With the recognition of the role that volcanic activity had in creating many of the surface features of the moon, Wilson turned his attention to the physics of volcanic eruptions. He wrote numerous research papers on the topics of volcanism on Earth and on other planetary bodies through his career, and his 2008 textbook on Fundamentals of Physical Volcanology was well received by reviewers. A second edition of this text was published in 2025.

In 1983, Wilson's work on volcanic processes was recognised with the N.L. Bowen award of the American Geophysical Union for 'outstanding contributions to volcanology, geochemistry, or petrology'. In 2005, Wilson received the G.K. Gilbert Award of the planetary section of the Geological Society of America; and in 2023, his long service to the volcanology community was rewarded with Honorary Life Membership of the International Association of Volcanology and Chemistry of the Earth’s Interior (IAVCEI). In 2025, Wilson was awarded the Thorarinsson Medal of IAVCEI; the highest award in international volcanology.
