= Tephrochronology =

Geochronological technique

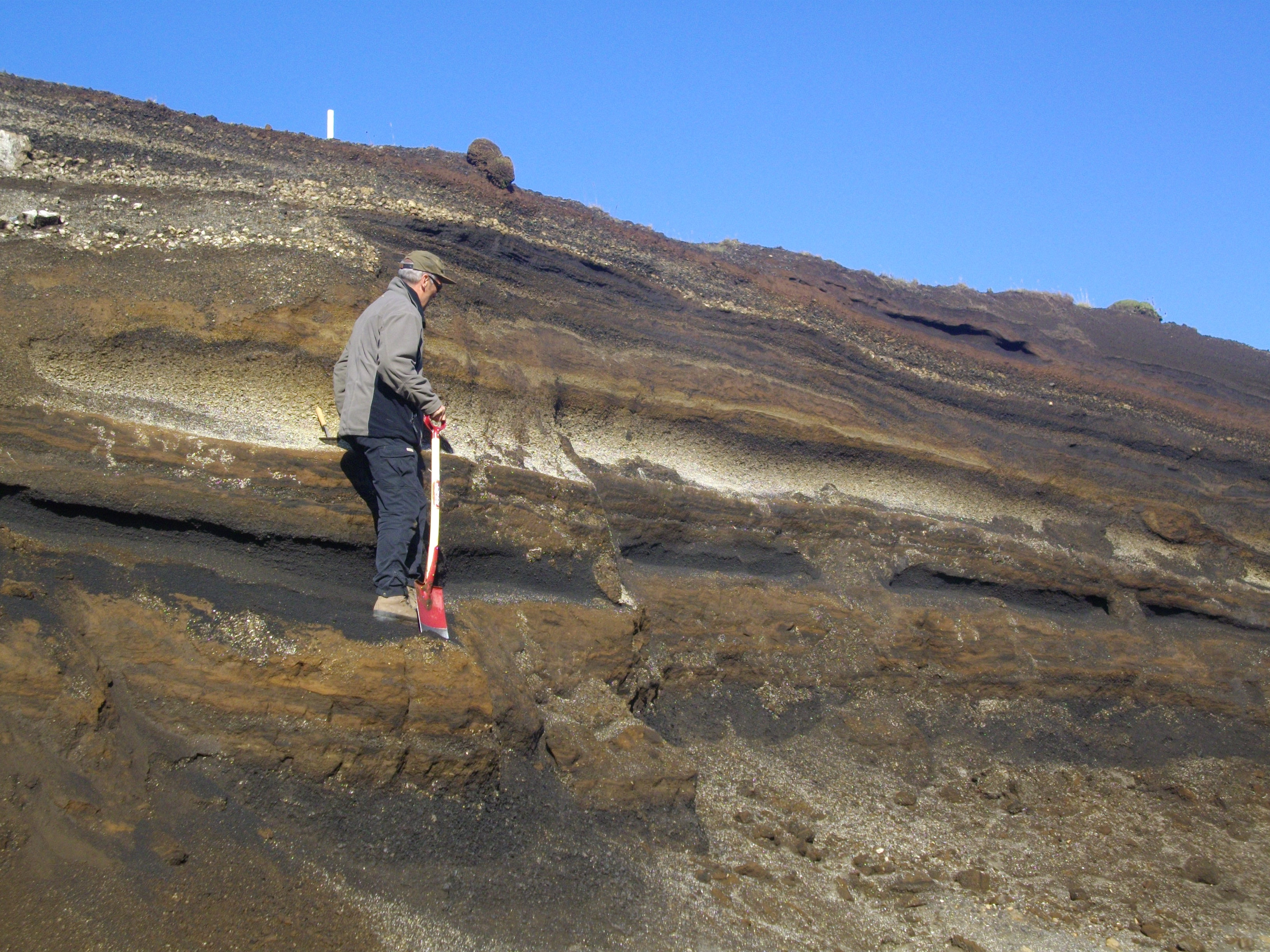
Tephra horizons in south-central Iceland. The thick and light coloured layer at the height of the volcanologist's hands is rhyolitic tephra from Hekla.

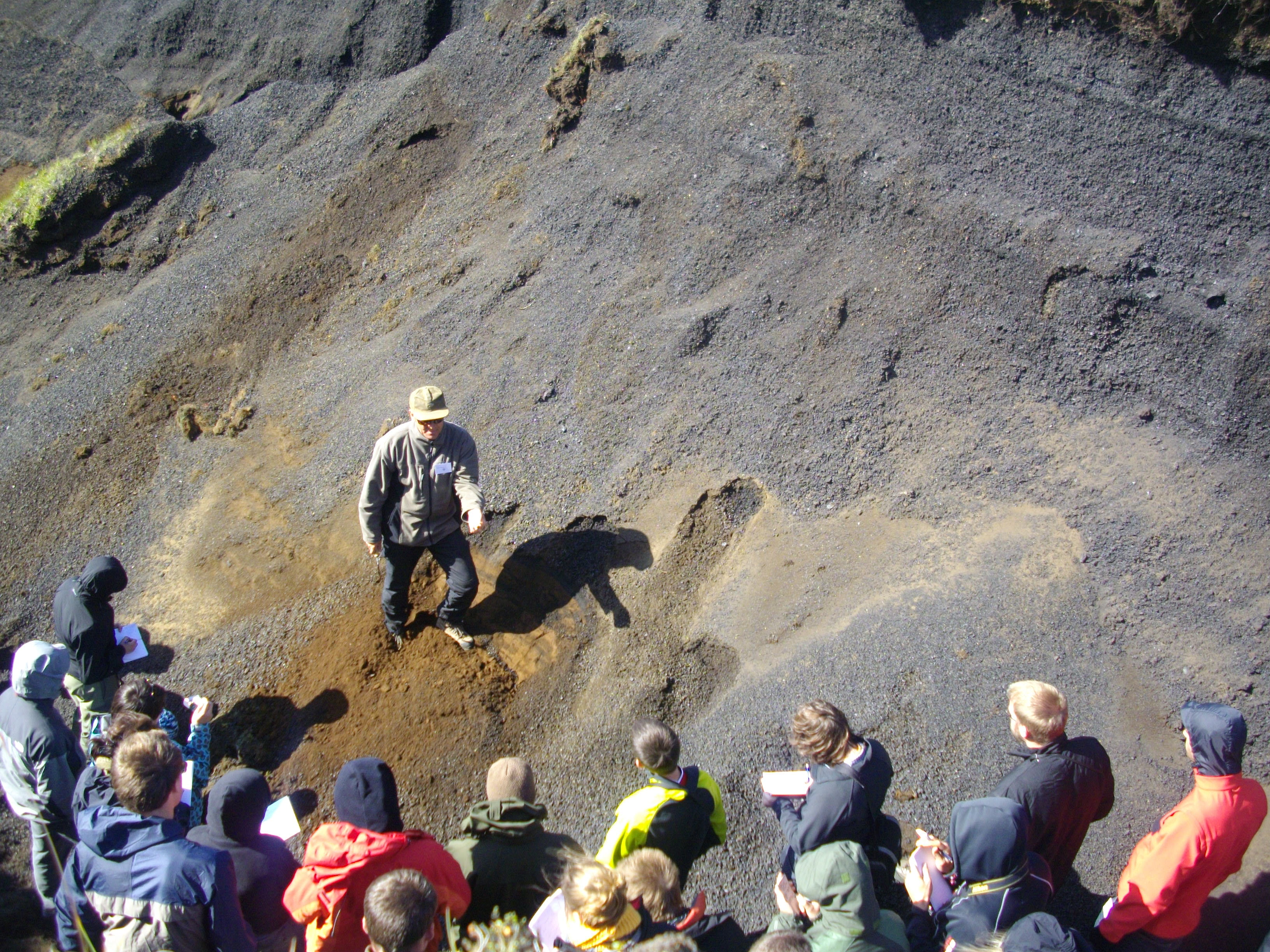
Geologist explaining the importance of tephrochronology to students on field in Iceland.

Tephrochronology is a geochronological technique for dating archaeological, geological and palaeoenvironmental sequences and events by their location between upper and lower layers of tephra (volcanic ejecta) of known date, and for correlating such sequences and events at separate locations between the same layers. The premise of the technique is that each volcanic event produces a "tephra horizon", a layer of ash with a unique chemical "fingerprint" that allows the deposit to be identified across the area affected by fallout. Thus, once the volcanic event has been independently dated, the tephra horizon will act as time marker. It is a variant of the basic geological technique of stratigraphy.

The main advantages of the technique are that the volcanic ash layers can be relatively easily identified in many sediments and that the tephra layers are deposited relatively instantaneously over a wide spatial area. This means they provide accurate temporal marker layers which can be used to verify or corroborate other dating techniques, linking sequences widely separated by location into a unified chronology that correlates climatic sequences and events. This results in "age-equivalent dating".

Effective tephrochronology requires accurate geochemical fingerprinting (usually via an electron microprobe). An important recent advance is the use of LA-ICP-MS (i.e., laser ablation ICP-MS) to measure trace-element abundances in individual tephra shards. One problem in tephrochronology is that tephra chemistry can become altered over time, at least for basaltic tephras. Some tephra horizons and the use of zircon directed techniques are more useful than others in linking layers over wide areas and determining eruption details. For example the often very explosive nature of rhyolytic eruptions will cause wider distribution, the higher potassium content of rhyolite allows more accurate time determinations, and the location of a deposit will influence its potential for chemical alteration after being laid down. Zircon techniques applied to tephra and other samples from the same eruption, may allow magma sources, magma residence times and the geochemical conditions of the magma formation to be better understood with dating of more than just the eruption itself, but also when the magma first evolved separately, or incorporated other rocks.

== History of speciality ==
The term tephrochronology appears to have been used by Sigurdur Thorarinsson as early as 1944. A key point in the establishment of this scientific field of study with what evolved to be a unique geoscientific method was in 1961 after a proposal supported by him led by Japanese researchers including Professor Kunio Kobayashi resulted in the establishment of an international scientific group. Much work had preceded this, but was limited by the techniques available at the time in geology. This had resulted in tephra formations not being linked and inaccurate timings that could not be related to events say with worldwide traces.

What would now be known as cryptotephra studies occurred in sea floor samples in the 1940s but Christer Persson in Scandinavia, was the first to publish articles in this field in the 1960s. Andrew Dugmore in 1989 was the first to use modern systematic methodology. Since then researchers have targeted stratigraphic archives of peat, lake sediment, ice cores, marine sediments, loess, floors of caves and rock shelters or stalagmites as well as contemporary eruption deposits.

Early tephra horizons were identified with the Saksunarvatn tephra (Icelandic origin, c. 10.2 cal. ka BP), forming a horizon in the late Pre-Boreal of Northern Europe, the Vedde ash (also Icelandic in origin, c. 12.0 cal. ka BP) and the Laacher See tephra (in the Eifel volcanic field, c. 12.9 cal. ka BP). Major volcanoes which have been used in tephrochronological studies include Vesuvius, Hekla and Santorini. Minor volcanic events may also leave their fingerprint in the geological record: Hayes Volcano is responsible for a series of six major tephra layers in the Cook Inlet region of Alaska. Tephra horizons provide a synchronous check against which to correlate the palaeoclimatic reconstructions that are obtained from terrestrial records, including fossil pollen studies (palynology), from varves in lake sediments or from marine deposits and ice-core records, and to extend the limits of carbon-14 dating.

A pioneer in the use of tephra layers as marker horizons to establish chronology was Sigurdur Thorarinsson, who began by studying the layers he found in his native Iceland. Since the late 1990s, techniques developed by Chris S. M. Turney and others for extracting tephra horizons invisible to the naked eye ("cryptotephra") have revolutionised the application of tephrochronology. This technique relies upon the difference between the specific gravity of the microtephra shards and the host sediment matrix. It has led to the first discovery of the Vedde ash on the mainland of Britain, in Sweden, in the Netherlands, in the Swiss Lake Soppensee and in two sites on the Karelian Isthmus of Baltic Russia. It has also revealed previously undetected ash layers, such as the Borrobol Tephra first discovered in northern Scotland, dated to c. 14.4 cal. ka BP, the microtephra horizons of equivalent geochemistry from southern Sweden, dated at 13,900 Cariaco varve yrs BP and from northwest Scotland, dated at 13.6 cal. ka BP.

Since 2010, Bayesian age modelling built around ever-improving ^{14}C-calibration curves and other age-related data, such as zircon double dating continues to better define tephrochronology.

== Sources ==
- Alloway B.V., Larsen G., Lowe D.J., Shane P.A.R., Westgate J.A. (2007). "Tephrochronology", Encyclopedia of Quaternary Science (editor—Elias S.A.) 2869–2869 (Elsevier).
- Davies, S.M.; Wastegård, S.; Wohlfarth, B. (2003). "Extending the limits of the Borrobol Tephra to Scandinavia and detection of new early Holocene tephras". Quaternary Research. 59 (3): 345–352. Bibcode:2003QuRes..59..345D. doi:10.1016/S0033-5894(03)00035-8. S2CID 59409634.
- Dugmore, Andrew; Buckland, Paul (1991). "Tephrochronology and Late Holocene Soil Erosion in South Iceland". Environmental Change in Iceland: Past and Present. Glaciology and Quaternary Geology. Vol. 7. pp. 147–159. doi:10.1007/978-94-011-3150-6_10. ISBN 978-94-010-5389-1.
- Keenan, Douglas J. (2003). "Volcanic ash retrieved from the GRIP ice core is not from Thera" (PDF). Geochemistry, Geophysics, Geosystems. 4 (11) 2003GC000608: 1097. Bibcode:2003GGG.....4.1097K. doi:10.1029/2003GC000608.
- Þórarinsson S. (1970). "Tephrochronology in medieval Iceland", Scientific Methods in Medieval Archaeology (ed. R. Berger) 295–328 (Berkeley: University of California Press).
