= Verdienstmedaille des Landes Rheinland-Pfalz =

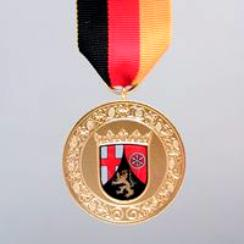
- Type: Civil order of merit
- Awarded for: Outstanding contributions to the state of Rhineland-Palatinate
- Country: Germany
- Presented by: the Minister-President of Rhineland-Palatinate
- Established: 13 February 1996

The Verdienstmedaille des Landes Rheinland-Pfalz (English: State of Rhineland-Palatinate Medal of Merit) is a civil order of merit, of the German State of Rhineland-Palatinate, whose Foundation on February 13, 1996 was carried out by Minister-President of Rhineland-Palatinate Kurt Beck. The award of the Medal of Merit is given as a sign of recognition and appreciation of special voluntary contributions to society and their fellow human beings, especially in the areas of corporate, social, cultural, sporty life as well as in environmental and nature conservation.

== Stylish look and way ==
The gold Medal is awarded by the Minister-President of Rhineland-Palatinate and shows on their Front the sublime embossed and colored enamelled Coat of arms of Rhineland-Palatinate. Enclosed in this is from a vine leaf border. The Back, however, is smooth and shows the five-line inscription FOR SPECIAL / VOLUNTEER / MERITS / TO THE COMPANY / AND THOSE AROUND, which is also surrounded by a vine border. It is supported medal at the upper left side of the chest on a black-red-golden ribbon. Instead of Merit Medal, a black-red-golden ribbon bar are worn.
