= Marta Lucía Calvache =

Colombian volcanologist

- Education: Universidad Nacional de Colombia University of Auckland (Dip) Louisiana State University (MSc, 1990) Arizona State University (PhD, 1995)
- Scientific career
- Workplaces: Colombian Geological Survey

Marta Lucía Calvache Velasco is a Colombian geologist and volcanologist, best known for her work on geological hazards and risk reduction in Colombia.

== Education ==
Marta Lucía Calvache graduated in geology from the Universidad Nacional de Colombia, Bogota. She then went on to study geothermal geology at the University of Auckland, and was awarded a Diploma of Geothermal Technology in 1984, with a thesis on 'Evaluation of some aspects of A.R.A. drillhole No. 1, Parakai, New Zealand'. In 1990, she completed a master's degree at Louisiana State University, with a thesis on the geology and volcanology of Galeras Volcano, Colombia. In 1995, Calvache completed a PhD degree at Arizona State University, where she worked with Stan Williams, with a thesis on the geological evolution of Galeras Volcanic complex. She then continued to a post-doctoral position at the University of Hokkaido, Japan.

== Career ==
Calvache began her career as a geologist with the Geothermal Division of the Colombian power company Central Hidroeléctrica de Caldas (CHEC). In 1985, she joined the team supporting the Committee for Volcanological Studies of the Caldas Department, in response to the renewed volcanic activity at Nevado del Ruiz Volcano. She played an important role in the lead up to and response to the subsequent tragedy, when the town of Armero was overwhelmed by lahars, triggered by the eruption of Nevado del Ruiz. In 1986, she joined the Colombian Geological Survey (SGC), then called INGEOMINAS, where she remained for the rest of her career. In her work with the SGC, she was at times Geologist with the Manizales Volcano Observatory, Director of the Pasto Volcano Observatory and head of the volcanology section at SGC. She became Director of Geohazards for SGC in 2014. Over the course of her career, Calvache has published many scientific papers on the volcanology and volcanism of the active volcanoes of Colombia, including some notable papers on the volcanoes Galeras and Nevado del Ruiz.

In 2025, Calvache contributed to a collection of perspective papers in the journal Nature Geoscience, to mark the 40th anniversary of the Armero disaster, reflecting on the transformation in the management of volcanic risk in Colombia since 1985.

In January 1993, Calvache was involved in the rescue operation after the sudden and fatal explosion of Galeras volcano, Colombia, during a volcanological workshop.

== Professional service ==
Calvache was secretary of the World Organisation of Volcano Observatories (WOVO), and served on the executive committee of the International Association of Volcanology and Chemistry of the Earth's Interior from 2007 to 2011.

== Recognition ==
Calvache was awarded the Krafft Medal of the International Association of Volcanology and Chemistry of Earth's Interior in 2017, for her "outstanding contributions to volcanology through service to communities threatened by volcanic activity". Calvache has been widely recognised across Colombia for her work on risk reduction. In 2022, she was awarded the Medal 'Orden de Combeima' by the municipality of Ibagué, and the Medalla Cacique Calarcá by the Governor of Tolima Department. In January 2023, Calvache was given Honorary Member status of IAVCEI, at the Scientific Assembly in Rotorua.
