= Gail Mahood =

American geologist (born 1951)

- Born: Gail Ann Mahood; June 27, 1951 (age 75); Oakland, California, U.S.
- Occupation: Geologist
- Spouse: Wes Hildreth (m. 1982)

Academic background
- Education: University of California, Berkeley (BA, MA, PhD)

Academic work
- Institutions: Stanford University
- Website: profiles.stanford.edu/gail-mahood

Gail Ann Mahood (born June 27, 1951) is a geologist and professor emerita at Stanford University, having retired in 2019 following a 40-year career there. She is a fellow of both the Geological Society of America and the Society of Economic Geologists.

== Early life and education ==
Gail Ann Mahood was born on June 27, 1951, in Oakland, California. She graduated from Redwood High School and entered the University of California, Berkeley, in 1969, but dropped out after her first year. After working as a secretary for a year and a half, she continued her education at the College of Marin before reentering UC Berkeley, from which she received multiple degrees in geology: a B.A. in 1974, an M.A. in 1976, and a Ph.D. in 1980. Her doctorate was advised by Ian Carmichael.

Mahood met Wes Hildreth as a fellow advisee of Ian Carmichael at UC Berkeley. The two were married in 1982. As of 2020, she was living in Felton, California.

== Career ==
While at Stanford, she served in multiple administrative roles, including associate vice provost of Graduate Education and chair of the Faculty Senate. Her geologic work on lithium deposits in geologic caldera basins was covered by the Smithsonian magazine.

=== Community involvement ===
Mahood is known for being active in local water authorities. She has served as both an Engineering Committee member, and as the president of the San Lorenzo Valley Water District. She has also held multiple positions for the Santa Margarita Groundwater Agency, including chair, vice chair, board director, and representative. She is a member of the Friends of San Lorenzo Valley Water.

Her expertise in this field is being able to link geologic changes and phenomena to the hydrology of watersheds.

She has led webinars and community events to educate the local communities about the water resources of the San Lorenzo Valley area.

=== Awards ===
Some of Mahood's work was awarded as being one of the "Top Geoscience Papers from 2016" by the Geological Society of America.

Mahood has also served as an evaluator for the Crafoord Prize. She has worked with the following journals and series:

- Geological Society of America Bulletin (Associate Editor: 1997–2000)
- Proceedings in Volcanology (Note: ISSN 0939-9658) (Founding Editor: 1988–94)
- Bulletin of Volcanology (Editor: 1990–92)
