= Charles Gilbert (cricketer) =

English cricketer

Personal information
- Full name: Charles Arthur William Gilbert
- Born: 9 January 1855; Melton Mowbray, Leicestershire, England
- Died: 28 September 1937 (aged 82); Primrose Hill, London, England
- Batting: Left-handed
- Bowling: Right-arm slow Right-arm fast

Domestic team information
- Years: Team
- 1895–1896: Staffordshire
- 1877–1878: Surrey

Career statistics
Competition	First-class
Matches	2
Runs scored	25
Batting average	8.33
100s/50s	–/–
Top score	17*
Balls bowled	–
Wickets	–
Bowling average	–
5 wickets in innings	–
10 wickets in match	–
Best bowling	–
Catches/stumpings	–/–
- Source: Cricinfo, 16 June 2013

Charles Arthur William Gilbert (9 January 1855 – 28 September 1937) was an English cricketer. Gilbert was a right-handed batsman bowled both right-arm slow and right-arm fast. He was born at Melton Mowbray, Leicestershire.

== Biography ==
Gilbert made two appearances in first-class cricket for Surrey against Middlesex at Lord's in 1877, and Cambridge University at The Oval in 1878. Gilbert scored a total of 25 runs in his two matches, top–scoring with 17 not out. After travelling England playing minor cricket, Gilbert eventually played for Staffordshire, making his Minor Counties Championship debut for the county against Worcestershire in what was the first season of minor counties cricket. He played three more times for Staffordshire in 1895, before making a final Minor Counties Championship appearance in the following season against Northumberland.

In addition to cricket, Gilbert attended Jesus College, Oxford and won an athletics blue with Oxford and finished second in the 120 yard hurdles event at the 1879 AAC Championships.

He died at Primrose Hill, London on 28 September 1937.
