= Charles M. Gilbert =

American geologist (1910–1988)

Charles Merwin Gilbert (May 22, 1910 – February 26, 1988) was an American geologist and professor. From 1938 until his retirement in 1977, he was a member of the faculty at the University of California, Berkeley.

Gilbert was born in Washington, D.C., on May 22, 1910. His father worked for the Carnegie Institution of Washington, so Gilbert was exposed to scientific minds from an early age. He attended Deep Springs College before transferring to Cornell University as a junior. In 1933, he received his A.B. degree. He came to the University of California, Berkeley, for his Ph.D. and completed that degree in 1938 with a dissertation on the Cenozoic geology of the region southeast of Mono Lake in California. The same year, Gilbert was appointed as an instructor in Berkeley's geology department; he was made an assistant professor in 1942. From 1943 to 1946—during World War II—Gilbert was employed in Arizona by the U.S. Geological Survey. After returning to Berkeley, he was promoted to associate professor in 1948. In the summers of 1951 and 1952, he worked as a field geologist for Shell Oil Company in Arizona and New Mexico. He was awarded a Guggenheim Fellowship in 1953, which he used "for geological studies in the Apennines and in Britain", and became a full professor the next year. From 1958 to 1962 he served as department chair.

At Berkeley, Gilbert developed a research interest in sedimentary petrology, especially of the region around Mono Lake, including studies on the origins of Bishop Tuff. Gilbert, Howel Williams, and Frank Turner published the textbook Petrography in 1954; a revised edition was published in 1982. His Physical Geology Laboratory Manual was published in 1962.

Upon his sudden death on February 26, 1988, he was survived by his children Jane, David, Douglas, and Stephen, and wife Lora. His final geologic work was a study of volcanic rocks near Guadalajara, Mexico, with Gail Mahood and Ian Carmichael.

== Sources ==
- Hay, Richard L. (1989). "Memorial to Charles M. Gilbert" (PDF). Memorials. 20. Geological Society of America: 31–32.
- Brimhall, George; Christensen, Mark; Curtis, Garniss; Reynolds, Mitchell (1993). "Charles Merwin Gilbert, Geology and Geophysics: Berkeley". In Memoriam. University of California: 46–47.
