= Christopher G. Newhall =

American volcanologist

Christopher G. Newhall is an American volcanologist, formerly with the U.S. Geological Survey and the Earth Observatory of Singapore. He is the co-creator of the Volcanic explosivity index and specializes in volcanic prediction.

== Life ==
A native Californian and son of an engineer, Newhall went to the Philippines in 1970 under the United States Peace Corps program. For his academic training, Newhall first attended the University of California, Davis (MS degree 1977) and later Dartmouth College, Hanover (PhD 1980) under the supervision of the late Professor Richard Stoiber. In 1971 he married Glenda, with whom he has two children. After retiring from the USGS Volcano Hazards Program after nearly three decades in 2005, he retreated with his wife to their home on the Philippines. In 2008 he moved to Nanyang Technological University in Singapore to take on the position of volcanology group leader at the newly formed Earth Observatory of Singapore. After finishing his Singapore work in 2013, he returned to the Philippines where he and his wife Glenda are developing a small botanical garden/ nature center (www.mirisbirisgarden.org)

== Publications ==
- Newhall, C. and Punongbayan, R., eds.Fire and Mud: Eruptions and Lahars of Mount Pinatubo, Philippines (1997) ISBN 0-295-97585-7 - a heavily cited collection of Volcanology reference material
- Benefits of volcano monitoring far outweigh costs - the case of Mount Pinatubo (1997)
- Historical unrest at large calderas of the world (1988)

== See also ==
- Volcanic explosivity index
- Mount Pinatubo
