= Patricia Ann Mothes =

American volcanologist

- Born: 1957 (age 68–69)
- Education: University of Texas at Austin (MSc)
- Scientific career
- Workplaces: Escuela Politécnica Nacional (IG-EPN), Ecuador

Patricia (Patty) Ann Mothes is an American volcanologist who has spent most of her career working in Ecuador. She is best known for her work on volcanic hazards and risk in Ecuador.

== Biography and education ==
Mothes was born in West Virginia, USA, in 1957. She studied geography at University, graduating with a master's degree from University of Texas, Austin. In 1986, she travelled to Ecuador with a grant from the Inter-American Foundation.

== Career ==
Mothes has worked for the Instituto Geofísico of the Escuela Politécnica Nacional (IG-EPN), in Quito, Ecuador, since 1987. The IG-EPN is the responsible institution in Ecuador for the study of seismic and volcanic risk. Mothes was Head of the Volcanology section of IG-EPN for many years, including during the long-term volcanic eruption sequence at volcan Tungurahua, which began suddenly in 1999, and lasted for over 15 years. As well as her national leadership in volcanology, Mothes is well known for her work on the hazards and risks from lahars, in particular those from Cotopaxi volcano. in 2017, IG-EPN adopted a cartoon figure based on Mothes and called "Patty la Vulcanóloga" to represent the institution on their digital and print media.

In 1993, Mothes was involved in the rescue of scientists who had been caught up in a fatal explosion on Galeras volcano, Colombia, during an international volcanological workshop.

== Recognition ==
Mothes served on the executive committee of the International Association of Volcanology and Chemistry of the Earth's Interior (IAVCEI) from 2011 to 2015. In December 2022, Mothes was recognised by the Government of Quito with the award of the "Gran Collar Barón de Carondelet". This distinction is reserved for people from outside Ecuador who have contributed to the development and progress of the city of Quito. In January 2023, Mothes was given Honorary Member status of IAVCEI, at the Scientific Assembly in Rotorua.

== Family ==
Mothes is married to the volcanologist Minard L. 'Pete' Hall.
