= Sigurður Þórarinsson =

Icelandic geologist, volcanologist and glaciologist

- Born: 8 January 1912; Vopnafjörður, Iceland
- Died: 8 February 1983 (aged 71); Reykjavík, Iceland
- Education: University of Copenhagen, 1931–1932; Stockholm University, 1932-1944
- Known for: Pioneered the field of tephrochronology
- Awards: Vega Medal (1970)
- Scientific career
- Fields: Geology, Volcanology, Glaciology
- Workplaces: University of Iceland, 1950–1983

Signature
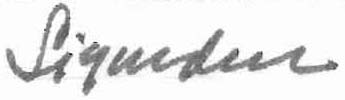

Sigurdur Thorarinsson (Icelandic: Sigurður Þórarinsson) (8 January 1912 – 8 February 1983) was an Icelandic geologist, volcanologist, glaciologist, professor and lyricist. He is considered a pioneer in the field of tephrochronology, and he made significant contributions in many areas of geology, especially volcanology and glaciology, both in Iceland and abroad.

== Biography ==
Sigurður Þórarinsson was born in Vopnafjörður in northeastern Iceland in 1912. He received his Ph.D. from Stockholm University College in 1944 and began a long and distinguished academic career as professor of geography at the University of Iceland. According to his obituary in The Geographical Journal, "He was something of a polymath who contrived to take geology, geomorphology, glaciology, climatology, and archaeology in his stride."

He died suddenly of a heart attack in Reykjavík in 1983. Subsequently, the International Association of Volcanology and Chemistry of the Earth's Interior (IAVCEI) decided to name its highest award the Thorarinsson Medal in his honor. As usual outside Iceland, the name of the prize misunderstands Icelandic naming conventions, because Þórarinsson is a patronymic not a surname, and in Iceland he would have properly been referred to by his given first name, Sigurður.

Eldur er í Norðri is a collection of papers, published by his colleague when Sigurður turned 70 years old.

In 1961, he was made a member of the German Academy of Sciences Leopoldina. He was the first to receive the award of Steno Medal in 1969 by the Geological Society of Denmark for his work with volcanology and tephrochronology.

Sigurdur Thorarinsson is the author of the lyrics to many well-known Icelandic songs, such as Þórsmerkurljóð (María María), Vorkvöld í Reykjavík and Að lífið sé skjálfandi.

== Bibliography ==
=== Books and Theses ===
- Thorarinsson, Sigurdur (1944). Tefrokronologiska studier på Island : Þjórsárdalur och dess förödelse. Thesis (doctoral)--Stockholms Högskola. pp. 217 pp.
- Thorarinsson, Sigurdur (1970). Hekla: A Notorious Volcano. Almenna bókafélagið, Reykjavík. OCLC 759118217.
- Nawrath, Alfred; Sigurdur Thorarinsson; Halldór Laxness (1959). Iceland: Impressions of a Heroic Landscape. Kümmerly & Frey, Berne. OCLC 869169300.
- Sigurdur Thorarinsson. Surtsey, the new island in the North Atlantic. New York: Viking Press, 1967, 47 pgs text and 53 pgs photographs.

=== Selected Significant Articles ===
- Thorarinsson, Sigurdur; T. Einarsson; G. Kjartansson (1959). "On the Geology and Geomorphology of Iceland". Geografiska Annaler. 41 (2–3): 135–169. doi:10.1080/20014422.1959.11904385. JSTOR 4626801.

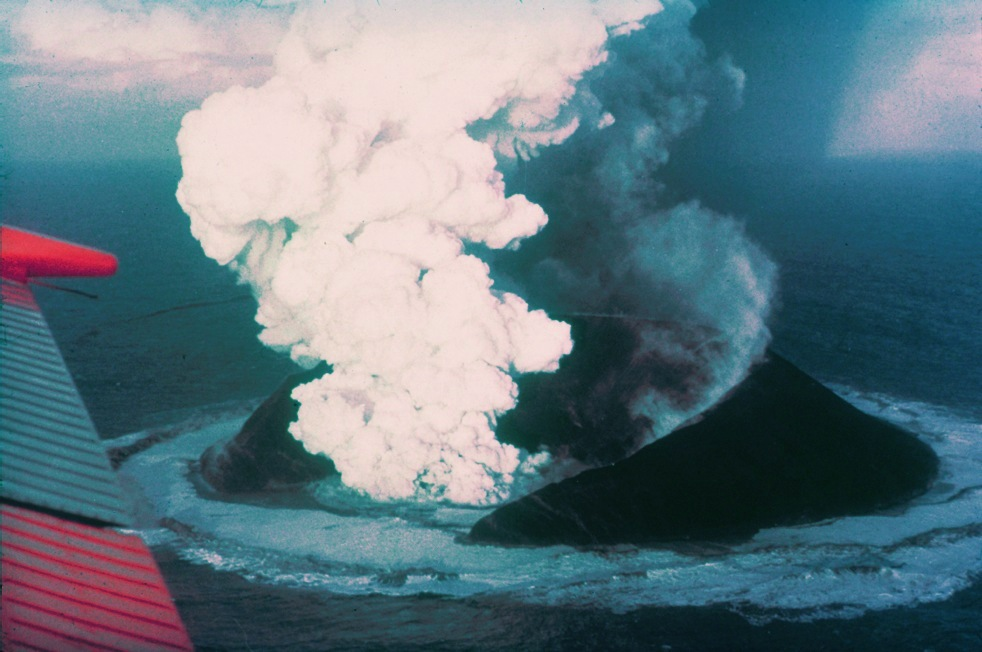
The new volcanic island of Surtsey, which rose out of the sea in 1963, was the subject of one of Sigurdur Thorarinsson's many books.
