= Bulletin of Volcanology =

- Discipline: Earth sciences, volcanology
- Language: English
- Edited by: Marie Edmonds

Publication details
- History: 1922–present
- Publisher: Springer (Germany)
- Frequency: bimonthly
- Impact factor: 2.517 (2020)

Standard abbreviations
- ISO 4: Bull. Volcanol.

Indexing
- ISSN: 0258-8900 (print); 1432-0819 (web)
- OCLC no.: 13622617

Links
- Journal homepage

The Bulletin of Volcanology is a peer reviewed scientific journal that is published ten times per year by Springer Science+Business Media. It is the official journal of the International Association of Volcanology and Chemistry of the Earth's Interior (IAVCEI). The focus of the journal is volcanoes, volcanic products, eruptive behavior, and volcanic hazards. The Executive Editor is Marie Edmonds.

The impact factor for Bulletin of Volcanology in 2020 is 2.517.

== Scope and history ==
Applying geochemical, petrological, and geophysical techniques to understand volcanic systems (magmatic systems) and their evolution is part of this journal's focus. Publishing formats include original research papers, reviews, communications, and a discussion forum. Additionally, this journal is a continuation of Bulletin Volcanologique which was published first in 1922. In 1986 Springer-Verlag started publishing this journal with Volume 48.

== Abstracting and indexing ==
Bulletin of Volcanology is indexed in the following databases:

- Academic OneFile
- Academic Search
- Astrophysics Data System (ADS)
- Current Abstracts
- Current Contents/Physical, Chemical and Earth Sciences
- EBSCO
- Gale
- GEOBASE
- GeoRef
- INIS Atomindex
- Journal Citation Reports
- PASCAL
- Science Citation Index
- SciSearch
- SCOPUS
- Summon by Serial Solutions
- VINITI
