= John W. Valley =

American geochemist and petrologist

John Williams Valley (born February 28, 1948, in Winchester, Massachusetts) is an American geochemist and petrologist. He is an expert on stable isotope geochemistry, especially as applied to understanding the evolution of the Earth's crust.

== Biography ==
Valley grew up in Lexington, Massachusetts, and started collecting rocks when he was four years old. He studied geology at Dartmouth College (AB 1970) and at the University of Michigan (MS 1977, PhD 1980) He was an assistant professor at Rice University (1980-1983) before moving to the University of Wisconsin, Madison, where he was an assistant professor (1983-1985), associate professor (1985-1989), and full professor from 1989 until his retirement in 2019 as professor emeritus. In 2005 he was appointed Charles R. Van Hise Distinguished Professor. He was a Fulbright Scholar at the University of Edinburgh (1989-1990). His doctoral students include Claudia Mora, Jean Morrison, and John Eiler.

Valley is an expert on stable isotope geochemistry applied to metamorphic, igneous and sedimentary rocks. He has worked extensively on high-grade metamorphic Precambrian rocks, especially in the Grenville Province of New York and Canada. He and his colleagues investigated the Sierra Nevada batholith, lavas from Pacific islands, and rhyolites from the Yellowstone Plateau Volcanic Field.

Valley has studied numerous proxies for paleoclimate including speleothems, mollusks, foraminifera, otoliths, pearls, and fossil teeth. He organized three conferences on applications of new SIMS technology to paleoclimatology (HiRes2013, 2015 and 2017).

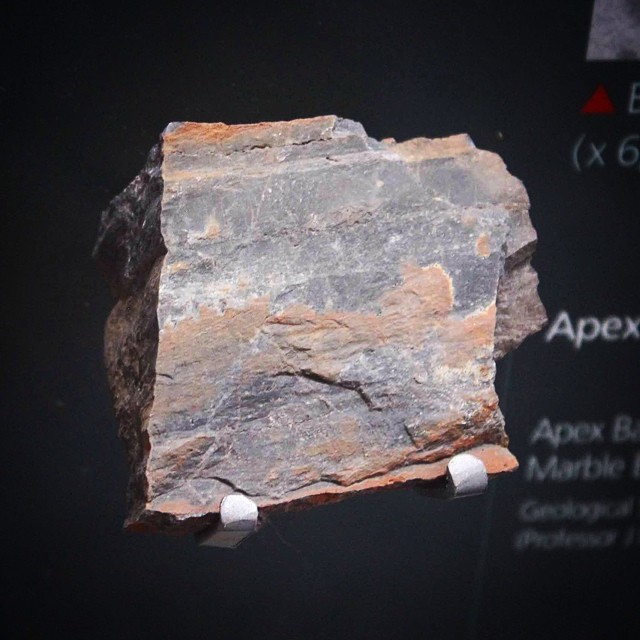
The Apex Chert is a flint-like rock from Western Australia, which contains some of the oldest known fossils. The microscopic fossils are single-celled bacteria, 3,500 million years old, and contain no nucleus (prokaryotes). They are either spherical or in filament-like chains. Chert typically consists of the petrified remains of siliceous ooze.

Valley and others demonstrated that carbonates in the Martian meteorite Allan Hills 84001 formed at low temperatures, and that material from the comet 81P/Wild is chondrule-like indicating transport from the asteroid belt to the cold outer reaches of the Solar System.

In 2001, Valley, with 3 co-workers, discovered the oldest known samples of Earth, detrital zircons from the Jack Hills in Western Australia, which document the existence of differentiated crust on Earth by 4.4 Ga (billion years ago) about 150 Myr (million years) after the Earth's formation at 4.55 Ga. The oxygen isotope ratios of these zircons indicate that the Earth cooled sooner, by over 600 Myr, than previous evidence indicated and that oceans were habitable to life by 4.3 Ga, 800 Myr earlier than the oldest well-documented micro-fossils. He has also shown, by a unique correlation of carbon isotope ratios (measured at micron-scale) to morphology, that these ancient fossils are indeed biogenic and lived in complex communities of microbial life 3,465 million years ago, indicating that the first life came earlier.

Valley has been active in professional service. In 2005, he founded the Wisconsin Secondary Ion Mass Spectrometry Laboratory (WiscSIMS) to develop new methods for measuring stable isotopes in the nano to micrometer range. Over 400 scientists have now worked at WiscSIMS. He served on many committees for mineralogy, geochemistry, and geology, including the NRC Committee on the Scientific Context for the Exploration of the Moon (2007). From 2014 to 2023 he served on the board of governors for the Gemological Institute of America. He has been associate editor for the Geological Society of America Bulletin (1985-1991), the American Journal of Science (1996-) and the Proceedings of the National Academy of Sciences (2021-). From 2011 to 2015 he was an editor in chief for the journal Elements. He was the president of Mineralogical Society of America in 2005–2006.

Valley was elected a Fellow of the Geological Society of America (GSA, 1992), the Mineralogical Society of America (MSA, 1993), the American Geophysical Union (AGU, 1996), the European Association of Geochemistry (2011), and the Geochemical Society (2011). AGU gave him the Norman L. Bowen Award in 2003 In 2019 GSA awarded him the Arthur L. Day Medal. In 2022 he received the Roebling Medal from MSA. He was elected a Member of the National Academy of Sciences in 2019.

In 2017, the International Mineralogical Association (IMA) approved the name "valleyite" for the mineral Ca_{4}Fe_{6}O_{13}, discovered by Huifang Xu and named in honor of John W. Valley.

In 1972 Valley married Andrée Simone Taylor. They have two sons, Matthew and David. Valley is also a skilled woodworker. Before graduate school, he made furniture in Helena, Montana, while there with Andrée, who was Resident Artist at the Archie Bray Foundation for the Ceramic Arts. Andrée works extensively in metal and ceramic sculpture. Her work is displayed internationally.

== Selected publications ==
- Valley JW and O’Neil JR. (1982) Oxygen isotopic evidence for shallow emplacement of Adirondack anorthosite. Nature 300, 9, 497–500.
- Valley, J. W.; McLelland, J; Essene, E. J.; Lamb, W (1983). "Metamorphic fluids in the deep crust: Evidence from the Adirondacks". Nature. 301 (5897): 226–228. Bibcode:1983Natur.301..226V. doi:10.1038/301226a0. hdl:2027.42/62547. S2CID 4361510.
- Valley, J. W., Bohlen, S. R., Essene, E. J., and Lamb, W. (1990) Metamorphism in the Adirondacks. II. The Role of Fluids. Jour. Petrol. 31, Part 3, 555–596.
- Valley, J. W. and Graham, C. M. (1993) Cryptic Grain-Scale Heterogeneity of Oxygen Isotope Ratios in Metamorphic Magnetite. Science 259, 1729-1733.
- Valley, John W.; Chiarenzelli, JR; McLelland, JM (1994). "Oxygen isotope geochemistry of zircon". Earth and Planetary Science Letters. 126 (4): 187–206. Bibcode:1994E&PSL.126..187V. doi:10.1016/0012-821X(94)90106-6.
- Valley, J. W., Kitchen, N. E., Kohn, M. J., Niendorf, C. R., and Spicuzza, M. J. (1995) UWG-2, A Garnet Standard for Oxygen Isotope Ratio: Strategies for High Precision and Accuracy with Laser Heating. Geochimica Cosmochimica Acta 59, 5223-5231.
- Valley JW, Kinny PD, Schulze DJ & Spicuzza MJ (1998) Zircon Megacrysts from Kimberlite: Oxygen isotope heterogeneity among mantle melts. Contributions to Mineralogy & Petrology, 133, 1–11.
- Valley, JW; Peck, WH; King, EM; Wilde, SA (2002). "A cool early Earth". Geology. 30 (4): 351. Bibcode:2002Geo....30..351V. doi:10.1130/0091-7613(2002)030<0351:ACEE>2.0.CO;2. ISSN 0091-7613.
- Valley, J. W.; Lackey, J. S.; Cavosie, A. J.; Clechenko, C. C.; Spicuzza, M. J.; Basei, M. A. S.; Bindeman, I. N.; Ferreira, V. P.; Sial, A. N.; King, E. M.; Peck, W. H.; Sinha, A. K.; Wei, C. S. (2005). "4.4 billion years of crustal maturation: Oxygen isotope ratios of magmatic zircon". Contributions to Mineralogy and Petrology. 150 (6): 561–580. Bibcode:2005CoMP..150..561V. doi:10.1007/s00410-005-0025-8. S2CID 53118854.
- Valley, JW; Cavosie, AJ; Ushikubo, T; Reinhard, DA; Lawrence, DF; Larson, DJ; Clifton, PH; Kelly, TF; Wilde, SA; Moser, DE; Spicuzza, MJ (2014). "Hadean age for a post-magma-ocean zircon confirmed by atom-probe tomography". Nature Geoscience. 7 (3): 219–223. Bibcode:2014NatGe...7..219V. doi:10.1038/ngeo2075.
- Valley JW, Spicuzza MJ, Ushikubo T (2014) Correlated δ^{18}O and [Ti] in Lunar Zircons: A Terrestrial Perspective for Magma Temperatures and Water Content on the Moon. Contributions to Mineralogy & Petrology, vol 167 (1): 1-15. doi:10.1007/s00410-013-0956-4.
- Valley JW, Reinhard DA, Cavosie AJ, Ushikubo T, Lawrence DF, Larson DJ, Kelly TF, Snoeyenbos D, Strickland A (2015) Nano- and Micro-geochronology in Hadean and Archean Zircons by Atom-Probe Tomography and SIMS: New Tools for Old Minerals. American Mineralogist, 100: 1355-1377. doi.org/10.2138/am-2014-5134.

=== As editor ===
- Valley JW, Taylor HP and O'Neil JR (1986) Stable Isotopes in High Temperature Geological Processes. Reviews in Mineralogy, Vol. 16, 570 p.
- Valley JW and Cole DR, eds. (2001) Stable Isotope Geochemistry. Reviews in Mineralogy and Geochemistry, Vol. 43, 662 p.
