= John Eiler =

American professor and geologist

- Born: John M. Eiler
- Education: Beloit College; University of Iowa (BS); University of Wisconsin-Madison (MS); University of Wisconsin-Madison (PhD)
- Scientific career
- Fields: Geology; Atmospheric Science; Geochemistry
- Institutions: California Institute of Technology
- Doctoral advisor: John W. Valley

John Mathew Eiler is an American geochemist and geologist, known for his contributions to stable isotope geochemistry. His work has provided insights into various scientific questions, such as determining the body temperatures of dinosaurs, understanding Earth's ancient climate, and studying the thermal histories of meteorites and planetary surfaces. As of 2025, he holds the position of Robert P. Sharp Professor of Geology and Geochemistry at the California Institute of Technology (Caltech) and serves as the Chair of Caltech's Division of Geological and Planetary Sciences.

== Biography ==
John Eiler began his academic path in geology at Beloit College and later at the University of Iowa, where he conducted early research on high-grade metamorphic rocks under the guidance of geologists Henry Woodard and Tom Foster. He completed his B.S. in Geology at Iowa in 1989. He then earned an M.S. and Ph.D. in Geology at the University of Wisconsin–Madison, where he studied under John W. Valley, focusing on mechanisms of stable isotope exchange in metamorphic minerals.

Following his doctoral work, Eiler joined the California Institute of Technology (Caltech) as a postdoctoral researcher in 1994, working with Edward Stolper and Sam Epstein. He was appointed Assistant Professor in 1998 and advanced to the Robert P. Sharp Professor of Geology and Geochemistry in 2008. In 2024, Eiler was named Chair of Caltech's Division of Geological and Planetary Sciences, assuming the Ted and Ginger Jenkins Leadership Chair.

== Research ==
Eiler's early research addressed the long-standing challenges in stable isotope thermometry. While isotopes theoretically met the criteria for effective geothermometers, observed results often failed to reflect realistic temperatures. Eiler developed a new theoretical basis to resolve this, culminating in the Fast Grain Boundary Diffusion model, which incorporated multiphase mass balance and offered a more physically realistic framework for inter-mineral isotope exchange. This model remains a cornerstone in the field of metamorphic geochemistry. While developing the diffusion model, Eiler contributed to advancing analytical techniques, particularly through improving the spatial resolution and precision of in situ oxygen isotope measurements using ion microprobes. His work enabled the detection of isotopic zoning within individual mineral grains—evidence of complex thermal histories and fluid interactions not previously resolvable. These insights established a more dynamic view of isotopic equilibration and helped move the field beyond equilibrium-based "snapshot" models of rock history.

At Caltech, Eiler expanded his research to mantle geochemistry. He applied laser fluorination techniques to analyze oxygen isotopes in ocean island basalts, producing high-precision datasets that refined interpretations of mantle reservoir compositions. His work showed that δ^{^{18}}O values in most mantle sources are more homogeneous than expected, despite crustal recycling processes. Notably, he identified isotopic evidence for subducted sediment contributions in EM2-type mantle reservoirs—findings not evident in radiogenic isotope systems. This helped redefine the geochemical architecture of the Earth's mantle and positioned stable isotopes as key tracers in mantle geochemistry. Eiler is also a pioneer in clumped isotope geochemistry, studying multiply-substituted isotopologues such as ^{13}C–^{18}O bonds in carbonates.^{,} This research enabled the development of new paleothermometers that do not rely on assumptions about the isotopic composition of water, and thus provide more robust reconstructions of past environmental temperatures.

Eiler's research has contributed to diverse areas, including reconstructions of paleoclimate, determining body temperatures of extinct organisms such as dinosaurs, studying the isotopic signatures of meteorites, and understanding thermal processes on planetary surfaces.^{,} His group has also designed novel instrumentation for high-precision isotope analysis, including Orbitrap mass spectrometers capable of resolving molecular isotopic structures. These tools are now being applied to study atmospheric gases, including D/H ratios in hydrogen (H_{2}), with implications for understanding hydrogen-fueled energy systems and planetary atmospheres.

== Awards and recognition ==
Eiler has been recognized with the following:

- Packard Fellow (2001-2006)
- Mineralogical Society of America Award (2002)
- James B. Macelwane Medal (2002)
- Fellow of the American Geophysical Union (2002–present)
- Associated Students of the California Institute of Technology Excellence in Teaching Award, 2002-2003
- Associated Students of the California Institute of Technology Excellence as a Research Mentor Award, 2007-2008
- S. Epstein Medal, European Association of Geochemistry (2009)
- Fellow of the Geochemical Society
- Distinguished Alumnus Award of the University of Wisconsin-Madison Department of Geoscience (2010)
- Arthur L Day Award of the Geological Society of America (2012)
- Fellow of the Geological Society of America (2013)
- Member of the National Academy of Sciences (2017–present)
- Distinguished Alumnus Awards of the University of Iowa College of Letters and Sciences and the Department of Earth and Environmental Science (2019)
