= Janet Hergt =

Australian geochemist

Janet Margaret Hergt
- Education: La Trobe University; Australian National University
- Occupation: Geochemist

Janet Margaret Hergt is an Australian geochemist. She is a Redmond Barry Distinguished Professor in the School of Geography, Earth and Atmospheric Sciences at the University of Melbourne, Victoria, Australia. The main focus of her research has been in the chemical analysis of rocks and minerals to explore the exquisite record of Earth processes preserved within them. Hergt is best known for her geochemical investigations of magmatic rocks although she has employed similar techniques in interdisciplinary projects including areas of archaeological and biological science.

== Early life and education ==
Hergt's earliest years were spent living on dairy farms in rural Victoria before moving to Frankston where she attended Karingal Primary School, and later Karingal High School. Hergt completed her undergraduate degree (BScHons) at La Trobe University in Melbourne in 1983, where she was awarded the David Myers University Medal and Ian Carlyle Medal in Geology. She received an Australian Government scholarship to study at the Australian National University in Canberra where she completed her PhD under the joint supervision of Bruce Chappell and Ian McDougall. Her project involved the analysis of compositionally unusual continental flood basalts (magmatism on a vast scale often occurring as a precursor to continental breakup) from the Ferrar Province and her thesis is entitled 'The Origin and Evolution of the Tasmanian Dolerites'. It was during this time that she learned to appreciate the power of trace element and isotopic data retrieved from magmatic rocks.

== Career and impact ==
Throughout her career, Hergt has retained a keen interest in extracting high quality geochemical data from rocks and minerals to solve problems in the geosciences. Her work on the Tasmanian Dolerites provided arguably the first dataset that combined major element, trace element, Sr-, Nd-, Pb- and oxygen isotope data on the same samples from a single suite of flood basalts. The dataset for the Tasmanian Dolerites, together with the extreme compositions of these rocks, provided the first opportunity to test competing hypotheses about source processes and constrain the origin of these magmas.

Hergt secured her first post-doctoral research position in the UK in 1988 working at the Open University with Chris Hawkesworth on a range of topics including further work on flood basalt magmatism (in Antarctica, Brazil and Siberia) with a number of Australian and international colleagues. It was at the Open University that she also began her studies into the geochemical expression of arc rupture and back-arc basin opening in the Lau Basin in the Southwest Pacific. Hergt participated on Integrated Ocean Drilling Program (IODP) Leg 135, identifying two mantle domains with geochemical characteristics of "Indian" or "Pacific" mid-ocean ridge basalts that has aided in understanding the mantle dynamics in this region. Other work from the IODP expedition demonstrated that magmas erupted at the earliest stages of arc rupture had the ability to tap mantle sources as well as source rocks modified by the flux of elements released from the subducting slab.

Following her move to the University of Melbourne in 1994, Hergt's contributions have involved a wide range of international collaborators and graduate students, and have included investigations of continental flood basalts, arc magmas, granite formation, ore deposits, the origin of kimberlites and processes preserved in mantle xenoliths. Hergt has also made important contributions in establishing innovative laboratory protocols and has supported the development of Iolite data visualisation software since its inception. Most recently, her work has extended to applications of geochemistry in the biosciences and archaeological science.

Hergt has held a variety of senior leadership roles at the University of Melbourne, including Deputy Head of the School of Earth Sciences (2001–2004), Associate Dean-Academic Programs in the Faculty of Science (2001–2003), Head of the School of Earth Sciences (2005–2013), Deputy Dean of the Faculty of Science (2011–2013 and 2014–2017), Acting Dean of the Faculty of Science (2013–2014), Deputy Vice President then Vice President and finally President of Academic Board (2018–2020). Hergt became a Vincent Fairfax Fellow in 2018 and was recognised as a Redmond Barry Distinguished Professor in 2019.

Hergt has served on a range of advisory boards, senior committees, review panels, and the editorial boards of several international journals (Chemical Geology 2008–2016; Geostandards and Geoanalytical Research 2000–2013; and the Journal of the Geological Society of London, 2002–2007). In 2021 the Geochemical Society (USA) and the European Association of Geochemistry awarded her the honorary title of Geochemistry Fellow for her contributions to the field of geochemistry.
