= Emily Klein =

Geologist and geochemist

Emily M. Klein
- Education: Columbia University; Barnard College
- Awards: F.W. Clarke Medal (1992)
- Scientific career
- Workplaces: Duke University
- Thesis: Geochemistry of ocean ridge basalts : mantle processes revealed by major element, trace element and isotopic variations (1989)

Emily M. Klein is a professor of geology and geochemistry at Duke University. She studies volcanic eruptions and the process of oceanic crust creation. She has spent over thirty years investigating the geology of mid-ocean ridges and identified the importance of the physical conditions of mantle melting on the chemical composition of basalt.

== Early life and education ==
Emily Klein was born in Los Angeles, California. Growing up, Klein was very interested in the field of medicine as she was always around her father who was a doctor. She worked at the office on Saturdays which led her to volunteer at the local hospital and the women's clinic. She would also always take science courses in school and be involved in science projects, and summer science programs. She got so interested and involved in medical science that she thought she would become a medical doctor herself. When she moved to New York City to attend Barnard College, she however became more interested in English and writing. While she still enjoyed science and continued to take science courses, she now pursued her greater passion for writing, be that journalism, creative writing, amongst other things. She went on to become a feature editor for the newspaper, and finally got her major in English.

After graduating from Barnard College in 1979, she became a science writer for a while, but soon went on to take a job at the Columbia University College of Physicians and Surgeons, as a physiology laboratory technician. Here she took part in multiple field research projects, where she did a bit of everything, from writing proposals, to doing laboratory work and experiments, to writing up and presenting research results. One of these studies entailed studying a monkey colony in Puerto Rico. She became interested in geology, and earned tuition credits to study courses at Columbia University. It was during this time as a researcher that she happened to stumble across a group of geologists, and consequently became really interested in the field. Although she had never taken any geology courses in her undergrad, her strong background in other sciences allowed her to easily transition into the field of geology. She started to take some geology courses at Columbia University where she worked at the time, and soon got accepted into the graduate program where she pursued a master's degree in geology. She went on to receive her doctorate degree here later. Her academic background and experience as a laboratory technician led her to become a geochemist.

During her time at graduate school, while studying geochemistry she went on sea expeditions to study the oceanic crust and the new idea of plate tectonics. Since the idea of plate tectonics was so new to the field, she decided to pursue that as her main field of research. She also investigated the chemical composition of the volcanic rocks collected from mid-ocean ridges around the world. She was awarded the Bruce C. Heezen Memorial Prize for her doctoral thesis in 1987. During her time at Columbia University she worked with Charles Langmuir on the study of mid-ocean ridge basalts, and together they produced many papers which gave her name increasing recognition within the field of geology. Langmuir and Klein demonstrated that the chemical composition of basalt correlates with the physical environment the basalt is recovered from; including the depth and thickness of the oceanic crust. This work marked a paradigm shift in the understanding of petrogenesis.

== Research and career ==
Klein has been involved in geology and geochemistry for over 40 years. Her research has been focused on oceanic crust, specifically completing deep sea research to track tectonic plate movement. She also found a fascination in analyzing volcanic activity and has researched the chemical processes of underwater volcanic activity. She is still active in her career today continuing to travel and complete sea excursions to gather research and data. Her most recent cruise included gathering data using “echo sounder” mapping technology. This technology uses sound beams to measure topographical structures on the ocean floor. Klein continues her research even when she is not on sea expeditions. A large portion of her discoveries occur in a chemistry lab. Most recently, she has been working on melting basalt rock (volcanic rock) as a way to theorize how ocean ridges change and evolve. This melting of basalt rock is an extensive process that requires chipping the rock into small pieces, then grinding it to a powder form, and finally heating it to 1200 degrees in order to find a melting point. After graduating, she received a lot of offers and opportunities, but she decided to teach undergrad at Duke University instead with the hope of inspiring students to study earth sciences.

Klein joined Duke University as an assistant professor in 1989. She was made professor in 2005. Part of the reason for this decision was because she had gotten married and wanted to start a family. Now she really enjoys teaching undergrad, and particularly enjoys opening young student’s minds to new ideas and introducing them to the vast field of scientific exploration and research. This semester (2021) she is co-teaching (with a faculty colleague in engineering) a project course called: Energy and Environment: Design and Innovation. She is also extremely passionate about supporting women and underrepresented minorities in science. She has observed that many women drop out of sciences quite early on, so she tries to inspire them to stay and pursue a career in the field. From 2004 to 2012, Klein served as director of the Baldwin Scholars' Program at Duke University, which provides leadership opportunities for women students. Klein was appointed Chair of Earth & Ocean Sciences at the Nicholas School in 2017.

Klein studies the movement of magma in the oceanic crust. She is interested in mid-ocean ridge, a globe encircling belt of volcanoes including the mid-Atlantic ridge. Klein has been on over eleven oceanographic cruises, investigating Incipient Ridge, Hess Deep and Pito Deep Rift. She uses remotely operated underwater vehicles to map the deep ocean, and directs submersible vessels to collect rock samples. She puts these rocks in a furnace, then analyses the chemical composition of the rocks using spectrometers. She is mainly interested in silica, iron, magnesium and aluminium, but also analyses trace elements such as copper, vanadium and uranium. On a cruise of the RV Atlantis, Klein discovered new deep sea hydrothermal vents in the Pacific Ocean. The vents, which Klein named the medusa hydrothermal vents, emit hot springs of iron-darkened water. In 2018 Klein took part in the RV Sally Ride (AGOR-28) investigation of the Cocos-Nazca spreading system.

=== Hess Deep ===
Klein researched volcanic eruptions and how it led to the development of crust on the ocean floor. To research this she focused on the processes that occurred under the ocean floor, where she studied the movement of magma underneath the crust. She studied the chemical composition of lava and collected samples from ocean floors to see differences in lava. In 1999, Klein went on a voyage to research the Hess Deep Rift. During this voyage she found evidence that opposed the idea that mid-ocean ridges had magma that always rose up from the magma chamber to the surface. By studying the composition of lava she was able to retrieve key information about the temperature and pressures of magma below the crust, as well as determining its origin. Klein researched samples of dikes beside rift walls, and assumed that they formed from the same part of the magma chamber, thus making their chemical composition relatively the same. Through further research, however, Klein discovered that the chemical structures of the dikes were clearly distinct from one another. Leading to the conclusion that the dikes must have originated from separate magma chambers. Through her research findings, she concluded that dikes in Hess Deep had magma that didn’t reach the surface and contained crystals and other minerals which made the magma light enough to reach the surface of the sea. Ultimately, Klein found that magma does not rise straight up to the surface of the ocean floor, and that dikes cannot be chemically identified by only the composition of lava on the seafloor. Researchers must take into account that magma can travel sideways and rise in other parts of the magma chamber.

=== Incipient Rift ===
In 2002 Klein sailed to the East Pacific Rise to further research a tectonic plate named the Galapagos Microplate. She wanted to carry out her endeavour to find lava samples of the incipient rift. They found volcanic activity along the entire rift, discovering that it was a plate boundary and what could be a newly forming microplate. This finding essentially caused scientists to rethink research on the evolution of the Galapagos microplate area.

=== Pito Deep ===
Klein has done extensive research regarding Pito Deep, an underwater abyss, in order to gain a greater understanding of the geology under the oceanic floor. Klein and other scientists sent a robot (Jason II) underwater to take pictures and obtain samples of lava and rocks for further testing. The main purpose of researching Pito Deep was to gain information about the ocean's crust. This is difficult to do since there are particular places in the ocean where tectonic forces prevent gaining access to the crust for the purpose of study. In the Pito Deep abyss, tectonic forces cause a large fault and rift, enabling geologists like Klein to look into the deeper layers of the ocean’s crust.

=== Awards and honors ===
- 1987 Bruce C. Heezen Memorial Prize
- 1992 Geochemical Society F.W. Clarke Medal
- 1992 National Science Foundation Young Investigator Award
- 2003 Geological Society of America Ingerson Lecture
- 2006 Duke University Bass Fellow
- 2018 Duke University Distinguished Service Professor
- 2022 Fellow of the American Association for the Advancement of Science

The parents of one of Klein's undergraduate students donated $100,000 to create an Emily M. Klein endowment fund.

=== Select Academic Works ===
- William H. Schlesinger; Emily M. Klein; Avner Vengosh (26 November 2020). "Global Biogeochemical Cycle of Fluorine". Global Biogeochemical Cycles. 34 (12). Bibcode:2020GBioC..3406722S. doi:10.1029/2020gb006722. ISSN 0886-6236. Wikidata Q117743742.
- Deborah K. Smith; Hans Schouten; Ross Parnell‐Turner; et al. (June 2020). "The Evolution of Seafloor Spreading Behind the Tip of the Westward Propagating Cocos‐Nazca Spreading Center". Geochemistry. 21 (6). Bibcode:2020GGG....2108957S. doi:10.1029/2020gc008957. ISSN 1525-2027. Wikidata Q109333005.
- Tingting Zheng; Jian Lin; Hans Schouten; Deborah Smith; Ross Parnell-Turner; Brian Tucholke; Johnson Cann; Emily Klein (15 January 2020). "Variations in crustal structure in the region of the Galapagos triple junction". Earth and Space Science Open Archive. doi:10.1002/essoar.10501777.1. Wikidata Q117933552.
- William H. Schlesinger; Emily M Klein; Avner Vengosh (6 March 2018). "Reply to Selin: Human impacts on the atmospheric burden of trace metals". Proceedings of the National Academy of Sciences of the United States of America. 115 (12): E2668. Bibcode:2018PNAS..115E2668S. doi:10.1073/pnas.1800958115. ISSN 0027-8424. PMC 5866611. PMID 29511107. Wikidata Q87981914.
- Stacey L. Worman; Lincoln F. Pratson; Jeffrey A. Karson; Emily M. Klein (24 June 2016). "Global rate and distribution of H^{2} gas produced by serpentinization within oceanic lithosphere". Geophysical Research Letters. 43 (12): 6435–6443. Bibcode:2016GeoRL..43.6435W. doi:10.1002/2016gl069066. ISSN 0094-8276. Wikidata Q117933309.
- Suzanne M. Carbotte; Deborah K. Smith; Mathilde Cannat; Emily M. Klein (6 February 2015). "Tectonic and magmatic segmentation of the Global Ocean Ridge System: a synthesis of observations". Geological Society, London, Special Publications. 420 (1): 249–295. doi:10.1144/sp420.5. ISSN 0305-8719. Wikidata Q64387071.
- Emily M. Klein; Scott M. White; James Andrew Nunnery; et al. (December 2013). "Seafloor photo-geology and sonar terrain modeling at the 9°N overlapping spreading center, East Pacific Rise". Geochemistry. 14 (12): 5146–5170. Bibcode:2013GGG....14.5146K. doi:10.1002/2013gc004858. ISSN 1525-2027. Wikidata Q59788323.
- Christopher L. Waters; Kenneth W.W. Sims; Emily M. Klein; Scott M. White; Mark K. Reagan; Guillaume Girard (May 2013). "Sill to surface: Linking young off-axis volcanism with subsurface melt at the overlapping spreading center at 9°03′N East Pacific Rise". Earth and Planetary Science Letters. 369–370: 59–70. Bibcode:2013E&PSL.369...59W. doi:10.1016/j.epsl.2013.03.006. ISSN 0012-821X. Wikidata Q59788325.
- V. D. Wanless; M. R. Perfit; E. M. Klein; S. White; W. I. Ridley (November 2012). "Reconciling geochemical and geophysical observations of magma supply and melt distribution at the 9°N overlapping spreading center, East Pacific Rise". Geochemistry. 13 (11). Bibcode:2012GGG....1311005W. doi:10.1029/2012gc004168. ISSN 1525-2027. Wikidata Q59788329.
- Michael Perfit; V. Dorsey Wanless; W. Ian Ridley; et al. (1 March 2012). "Lava Geochemistry as a Probe into Crustal Formation at the East Pacific Rise". Oceanography. 25 (1): 89–93. doi:10.5670/oceanog.2012.06. ISSN 1042-8275. Wikidata Q117938290.
