= Thermal (disambiguation) =

Thermal is an adjective related to heat. A "thermal" is an atmospheric convection phenomenon.

Thermal may also refer to:

== Arts ==
- The Thermals, indie/punk band from Portland, Oregon

== Science and technology ==
- Thermal, reference to Temperature, especially if elevated or depressed beyond normal temperatures
- Thermal power station, power station that produces electricity using heat
- Thermal radiation, electromagnetic radiation generated by the thermal motion of charged particles in matter
- Thermal relief, used in printed wiring boards
- Thermal underwear, worn in the cold to conserve body heat
- Thermography, or thermal imaging

== Places ==
- Thermal, California, a small town in the United States

== See also ==
- Thermodynamics, or thermal physics
- Thermite
- Thermo (disambiguation)
- Special:Prefixindex/Therm
- Geothermal (disambiguation)
