= Mark S. Ghiorso =

American geochemist

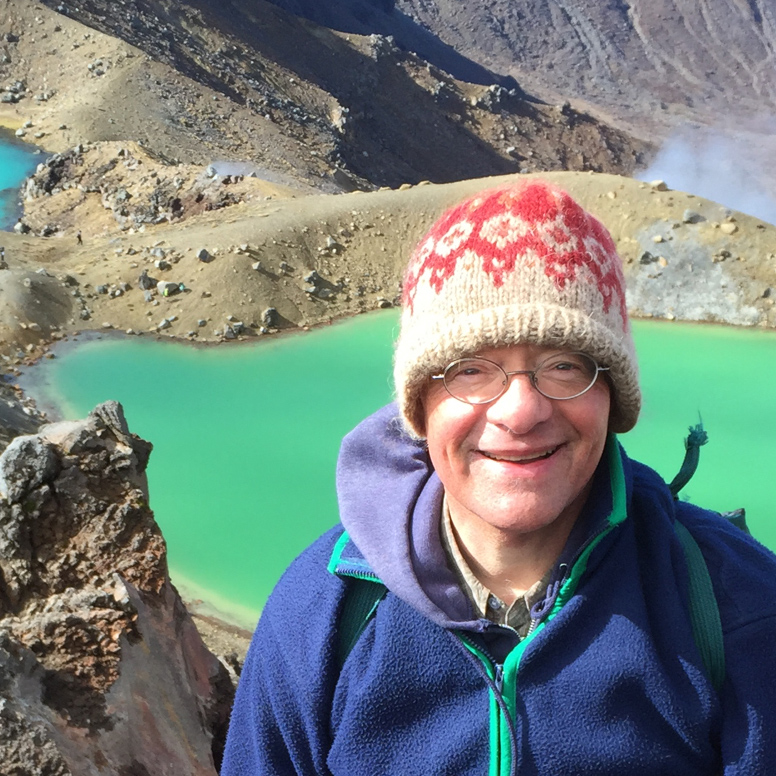
- In Tongariro National Park, New Zealand
- Born: October 21, 1954; San Francisco, California
- Citizenship: American
- Education: University of California Berkeley
- Known for: modeling phase equilibria in magmatic systems
- Scientific career
- Fields: geochemistry
- Workplaces: OFM Research, University of Washington, Vanderbilt University
- Doctoral advisor: Ian Carmichael
- Website: markghiorso.org

Mark S. Ghiorso (born October 21, 1954) is an American geochemist who resides in Seattle, Washington. He is best known for creating MELTS, a software tool for thermodynamic modeling of phase equilibria in magmatic systems.

== Education ==
Ghiorso earned an AB, MS, and PhD from the University of California, Berkeley. He chose Berkeley for practical reasons: "I went to Berkeley because it was the local school, because tuition was essentially free, and because I was fascinated as a high school student with hot springs, volcanos, and, in particular, the work of Howell Williams [sic] and Arthur L. Day."

== Career ==
In 1980, Ghiorso was hired by the University of Washington (UW) as assistant professor in the department of geological sciences. He was promoted to associate professor (a tenured position) three years later and to full professor in 1986. He served as department chair from 1994 to 1999.

In 2003, he was hired by the University of Chicago. Leaving the UW was a difficult decision, as Ghiorso is a great believer in public education. He cited serious concerns about the UW administration as a primary reason for departing.

In 2005 he decided to leave academia and dedicate himself full-time to research. He returned to Seattle and, with his colleague Richard Sack, founded the small non-profit research company OFM Research, where he is vice president and senior research scientist. He also holds affiliate faculty appointments at the University of Washington and Vanderbilt University.

Ghiorso has also served as associate editor for the following scientific journals: American Journal of Science (1990–present); American Mineralogist (1990–1993); Geochimica et Cosmochimica Acta (1991–1993); and Contributions to Mineralogy and Petrology (2015–present),

== Scientific contributions ==
As an undergraduate, Ghiorso wrote an honors thesis on the hot springs in the Devil's Kitchen area of Lassen Volcanic Park. This work was never published. During his graduate work he continued to do experimental work related to acid sulfate hot springs until he became interested in attempts by Ian Carmichael to create a model for solutions in silicate liquids that could be used as a geothermometer for igneous rocks.

=== Background ===
In igneous petrology, geologists attempt to learn more about volcanic systems through the record in igneous rocks. Most magma is generated in the mantle through a process called decompression melting. As material rises and the pressure decreases, solidus declines until part of the mantle can melt. At or near the surface, the magma cools and crystallizes. Depending on the conditions, it may have time to cool uniformly, or fractional crystallization can occur if parts of the magma are removed after they crystallize.

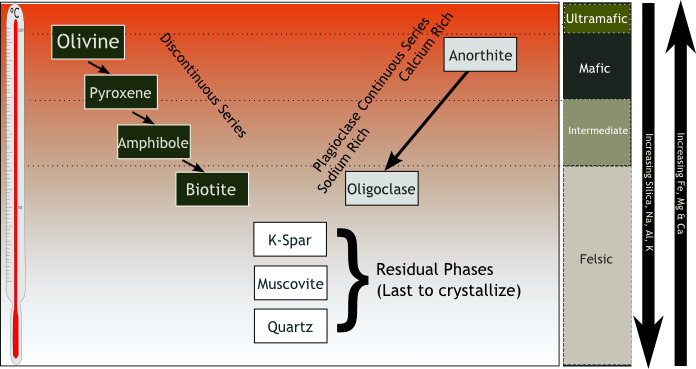
Bowen's reaction series

An early model for fractional crystallization, which explained why certain types of mineral tend to be found together in igneous rocks, was Bowen's reaction series, formulated in 1922. Bowen found that, as magma crystallizes, it separates into two series: a continuous series of minerals that continuously adjusts their composition through interactions with the melt, and a discontinuous series of minerals that remain fixed in composition as they cool. Thus, the type of mineral indicates the temperature at which it was formed.

Until the 1960s, interpretation of the igneous rock record was largely qualitative. Ian Carmichael wanted to determine quantitative information such as the temperature and pressure of the magma when crystals were formed as well as dissolved water and oxygen content. For this, thermodynamic models were needed. Although attempts to apply rigorous thermodynamics to igneous processes go back to at least 1949, they were hindered by a lack of experimental data. Using tools such as a drop calorimeter and wet chemistry, Carmichael and colleagues set out to systematically explore thermodynamic properties of magma at high temperatures.

=== Thermodynamic models ===
Ghiorso began working with Carmichael on silicate-liquid models in 1978, and in 1980 they published their first geothermometers. Carmichael hired Richard Sack in 1980, and Sack began extensive experiments that went into a more sophisticated model that was published in 1983, when Ghiorso was at the University of Washington. Ghiorso wrote a program in FORTRAN 77 that he distributed to other researchers. Ghiorso and Sack realized, however, that the model needed to become more sophisticated.

At first, NSF program managers were skeptical of this computational approach, and Ghiorso had three NSF proposals turned down. Fortunately, he managed to persuade the Digital Equipment Corporation to fund his work. After a decade of publishing thermodynamic data on minerals such as olivine and feldspar, Ghiorso and Sack presented their new model, now called MELTS. Their 1995 publication in Contributions to Mineralogy and Petrology became the journal's most cited paper, with more than 2,100 citations as of early 2017.

After the publication of MELTS, Ghiorso continued to improve and extend it with the help of colleagues such as Mark Hirschmann, Paul Asimow, Pete Reiners and Victor Kress. After they identified some fundamental problems with the theory at high pressure, they developed pMELTS, a model for high pressures (1-3 gigapascals (GPa)), and published it in 2001. Asimow and co-authors published phMELTS, a model for mid-ocean ridge basalts that incorporated the effect of water content. In 1998, Ghiorso, Hirschmann and Tim Grove established the Library of Experimental Phase Relations (LEPR), an online database for experimental results on solid-melt equilibria. With Guilherme (Guil) Gualda, he modified MELTS to work better with rhyolite, a silicate-rich series of rocks, and released rhyolite-MELTS.

Ghiorso is the lead investigator on an NSF collaborative research grant to develop ENKI (Enabling Knowledge Integration), a Web-based model-configuration and testing portal for computational thermodynamics and fluid dynamics. He is the lead principal investigator on the project. With Dmitri Sverjensky of Johns Hopkins University, Ghiorso is leading a Deep Carbon Observatory project to integrate MELTS with the Deep Earth Water Model (DEW) created by Sverjensky. The DEW program models water-rock interactions to depths of 200 km. The movement of carbon between silicate melts and aqueous fluids is still poorly understood.

== Awards ==
In 1984, while Ghiorso was at the University of Washington, he received a Presidential Young Investigator Award, a research grant for an amount of $245,918, from the National Science Foundation. For a paper published in Computers & Geosciences, he received the Best Paper Award from its publisher, the International Association for Mathematical Geosciences. He was elected Fellow of the Mineralogical Society of America in 1993, the Geological Society of America in 1997, and the American Geophysical Union in 1999. The Mineralogical Society of America made him a Distinguished Lecturer for 1996–1997, elected him Councilor for 1997–2001, awarded him the Dana Medal in 2003, and elected him president in 2021. He received the Bunsen Medal from the European Geosciences Union in 2010 and the Norman L. Bowen Award from the VGP Section of the American Geophysical Union in 2014.

== Publications ==
Ghiorso has published more than 120 peer-reviewed papers for a total of more than 10,000 citations and an h-index of 47. Some of the more highly cited papers follow:

- Ghiorso, Mark S.; Sack, Richard O. (March 1995). "Chemical mass transfer in magmatic processes IV. A revised and internally consistent thermodynamic model for the interpolation and extrapolation of liquid-solid equilibria in magmatic systems at elevated temperatures and pressures". Contributions to Mineralogy and Petrology. 119 (2–3): 197–212. Bibcode:1995CoMP..119..197G. doi:10.1007/BF00307281. S2CID 95737651.
- Gualda, Guilherme A. R.; Ghiorso, Mark S.; Lemons, Robin V.; Carley, Tamara L. (May 2012). "Rhyolite-MELTS: A modified calibration of MELTS optimized for silica-rich, fluid-bearing magmatic systems". Journal of Petrology. 53 (5): 875–890. doi:10.1093/petrology/egr080.
- Ghiorso, Mark S.; Hirschmann, Marc M.; Reiners, Peter W.; Kress, Victor C. (May 2002). "The pMELTS: A revision of MELTS for improved calculation of phase relations and major element partitioning related to partial melting of the mantle to 3 GPa". Geochemistry, Geophysics, Geosystems. 3 (5): 1030. Bibcode:2002GGG.....3.1030G. doi:10.1029/2001GC000217.
- Asimow, Paul D.; Ghiorso, Mark S. (1 October 1998). "Algorithmic modifications extending MELTS to calculate subsolidus phase relations". American Mineralogist. 83 (9–10): 1127–1132. Bibcode:1998AmMin..83.1127A. doi:10.2138/am-1998-9-1022. S2CID 28848135.
- Sack, R. O.; Carmichael, I. S. E.; Rivers, M.; Ghiorso, M. S. (February 1981). "Ferric-ferrous equilibria in natural silicate liquids at 1 bar". Contributions to Mineralogy and Petrology. 75 (4): 369–376. Bibcode:1981CoMP...75..369S. doi:10.1007/BF00374720. S2CID 96610217.
- Sack, Richard O; Ghiorso, Mark S (1991). "Chromian spinels as petrogenetic indicators: Thermodynamics and petrological applications". The American Mineralogist. 76 (5–6): 827–847.
- Baker, M. B.; Hirschmann, M. M.; Ghiorso, M.S.; Stolper, E. M. (25 May 1995). "Compositions of near-solidus peridotite melts from experiments and thermodynamic calculations". Nature. 375 (6529): 308–311. Bibcode:1995Natur.375..308B. doi:10.1038/375308a0. S2CID 4264062.
- Ghiorso, Mark S.; Evans, Bernard W. (November 2008). "Thermodynamics of Rhombohedral Oxide Solid Solutions and a Revision of the FE-TI Two-Oxide Geothermometer and Oxygen-Barometer". American Journal of Science. 308 (9): 957–1039. Bibcode:2008AmJS..308..957G. doi:10.2475/09.2008.01. S2CID 93837671.
- Ghiorso, Mark S.; Sack, Richard O. (October 1991). "Fe-Ti oxide geothermometry: thermodynamic formulation and the estimation of intensive variables in silicic magmas". Contributions to Mineralogy and Petrology. 108 (4): 485–510. Bibcode:1991CoMP..108..485G. doi:10.1007/BF00303452. S2CID 128750411.
- Ghiorso, Mark S.; Carmichael, Ian S.E.; Rivers, Mark L.; Sack, Richard O. (November 1983). "The Gibbs free energy of mixing of natural silicate liquids; an expanded regular solution approximation for the calculation of magmatic intensive variables". Contributions to Mineralogy and Petrology. 84 (2–3): 107–145. Bibcode:1983CoMP...84..107G. doi:10.1007/BF00371280. S2CID 94652920.

== Software tools ==
Software tools that Ghiorso has created, either alone or with others, include the following:

- ENKI Portal
- MELTS, pMELTS, and thermodynamic properties calculators
- CTserver: web services for computational thermodynamics of geological materials
- LEPR, a database portal for experimental data on mineral-melt equilibria
- PhasePlot, software to visualize phase equilibria on pressure-temperature grids.
- MagmaSat (Mac) and MagmaSatApp (iPad), software to compute saturation conditions of H_{2}O-CO_{2} mixed fluids in natural composition silicate melts
