= Ian S. E. Carmichael =

British-American geologist (1930–2011)

Ian S. E. Carmichael FRS
- Born: Ian Stuart Edward Carmichael; 29 March 1930; London, England, UK
- Died: 26 August 2011 (aged 81); Berkeley, California, US
- Education: Westminster School; University of Cambridge (BA, MA); Imperial College London (PhD)
- Known for: Thermodynamics of igneous systems
- Scientific career
- Workplaces: University of California, Berkeley
- Thesis: Volcanic geology of Thingmuli, eastern Iceland (1962)
- Doctoral advisor: George P. L. Walker
- Notable students: Wes Hildreth; Charles R. Bacon; Frank J. Spera; Mark S. Ghiorso; Jim Luhr; Rebecca Lange

Ian Stuart Edward Carmichael FRS (29 March 1930 –26 August 2011) was a British-born American igneous petrologist and volcanologist who established extensive quantitative methods for research in the thermodynamics of magma.

== Early life and education ==
Carmichael was born on 29 March 1930 in London, and was raised in the town of Haywards Heath. He was educated at Westminster School in London from age six until his senior year of high school, when he took an exchange trip to Connecticut; he stayed in the United States and enrolled in the Colorado School of Mines. He studied there for one semester before returning to England, where he was drafted into the British Army. He served in Egypt, Palestine, and Sudan for two years before winning a place at Trinity Hall, Cambridge. He obtained Bachelor of Arts and Master of Arts degrees in natural sciences (geology, specifically mineralogy and petrology) from the University of Cambridge in 1954, and his Ph.D. in 1958 from Imperial College London, where he wrote his thesis on Iceland's Thingmuli volcano.

== Career and research ==
After completing his thesis, Carmichael worked as a lecturer at Imperial College. In 1963, he began a six-month leave to work at the University of Chicago. He applied for more time at the conclusion of his term, but was rejected. Carmichael was invited to give a lecture at the University of California, Berkeley, which led to him starting a tenured position as an associate professor. He remained at Berkeley for the remainder of his career, and retired from the university in 2004.

In 2004, Carmichael was the volume 1 editor of B. J. Wood's Landmark Papers series.

=== Awards and honours ===
Carmichael was the recipient of numerous awards and recognitions including a special issue of Contributions to Mineralogy and Petrology published in his honor in 2013, the Mineralogical Society of Great Britain and Ireland's 1992 Mineralogical Society–Schlumberger Award, a Guggenheim Fellowship that same year, the Arthur L. Day Medal in 1991, and the Bowen Award in 1986.

Carmichael was elected a fellow of the Royal Society in 1999, and an honorary fellow of the Mineralogical Society of Great Britain and Ireland in 2004. He was also a fellow of the Geological Society of America, the Mineralogical Society of America, and the American Geophysical Union. The mineral carmichaelite, as well as the Geological Society of America's Carmichael Student Research Grants program, are both named in his honor.
