= F.W. Clarke Award =

The F.W. Clarke Award is an annual award presented by the Geochemical Society to an early-career scientist for a single outstanding contribution to geochemistry or cosmochemistry, published either as a single paper or a series of papers on a single topic. The award is named after Frank Wigglesworth Clarke, one of the founding fathers of geochemistry. F.W. Clarke medal have in the past been disproportionately given to white men, though this is changing.

== List of recipients ==
- Source: Geochemical Society
- 1972 Dimitri A. Papanastassiou
- 1973 Hiroshi Ohmoto
- 1974 Lawrence Grossman
- 1975 David Walker
- 1976 James R. Wood
- 1977 Bjorn O. Mysen
- 1978 Donald J. DePaolo
- 1979 Antonio C. Lasaga
- 1980 R.W. Potter, II
- 1981 Jean-Francois Minster
- 1982 P. Jonathan Patchett
- 1983 E. Bruce Watson
- 1984 Andrew S. MacKenzie
- 1985 Edward M. Stolper
- 1986 Mark D. Kurz
- 1987 Eiichi Takahashi
- 1988 Fred M. Phillips
- 1989 No Award Given
- 1990 Richard J. Walker
- 1991 David M. Sherman
- 1992 Emily Klein
- 1993 Youxue Zhang
- 1994 Carl B. Agee
- 1995 Rebecca A. Lange
- 1996 Patricia M. Dove
- 1997 Jonathan Blundy
- 1998 Munir Humayun
- 1999 Andre Scheidegger
- 2000 James Farquhar
- 2001 Craig C. Lundstrom
- 2002 Ruth E. Blake
- 2003 Paul D. Asimow
- 2004 Andrea Grottoli
- 2005 James A. van Orman
- 2006 Alexis S. Templeton
- 2007 Ethan F. Baxter
- 2008 Andrew D. Jacobson
- 2009 Cin-Ty Lee
- 2010 Thorsten Kleine
- 2011 Rajdeep Dasgupta
- 2012 David T. Johnston
- 2013 Blair Schoene
- 2014 Matthew G. Jackson
- 2015 Anat Shahar
- 2016 Laurence Yeung
- 2017 Francis McCubbin
- 2018 Noah Planavsky
- 2019 Thomas Kruijer
- 2020 Daniel Stolper
- 2021 Mark Torres
- 2022 Yige Zhang
- 2023 Sarah Aarons
- 2024 Jihua Hao
- 2025 Suzanne K. Birner

== See also ==
- List of chemistry awards
- List of earth sciences awards
- List of geology awards
- Prizes named after people
