= Eric Langmuir =

Scottish mountaineer and educationalist

Eric Duncan Grant Langmuir
- Born: 3 May 1931; Glasgow, Scotland
- Died: 18 September 2005 (aged 74); Mountain of Aviemore, Scotland
- Occupations: mountaineer, educationalist
- Known for: Principal of Glenmore Lodge National Outdoor Training Centre, Aviemore.: First ascent of Spartan Slab, Trilleachan Slabs, Glen Etive, 1954; First ascent of The Mole, Dinas Mot, Llanberis Pass, Wales, 1961
- Notable work: Author of Mountaincraft and Leadership
- Spouse: Maureen Lyons (m.1957)
- Children: 4, including olympians Sean (1992 Winter Olympics) and Roddy (1980 Winter Olympics)
- Awards: MBE (1986), FRSE (1978)

Eric Duncan Grant Langmuir MBE FRSE (3 May 1931 – 18 September 2005) was a Scottish mountaineer and educationalist.

== Education ==
Langmuir attended the independent school Fettes College in Edinburgh (1943–1950) and, after national service, Peterhouse, Cambridge, where he read natural sciences (Geology, Zoology and Physiology) from 1952 to 1955. Whilst at Cambridge he joined the Cambridge University mountaineering club (CUMC), later becoming its president (1954–55).

== Climbing ==
In 1954, he established the first modern rock climbing routes on the "Etive Slabs" on Beinn Trilleachan when he went with Mike O'Hara and others "to investigate a report that Eric's father had given of some rocks on Beinn Trilleachan that he had spotted when fishing on the loch and which might be of interest. They made the first ascent of "Sickle" and of "Spartan Slab" (the latter a 3-star classic climb at VS 4c). In 1958, he led a group of climbers from Cambridge University to Wintour's Leap in Gloucestershire, where they discovered the then unclimbed "North Wall"; the routes they established on that wall almost doubled the number of climbs on Wintour's Leap and were several grades harder than any of the existing climbs there. His alpine climbing included the first British ascent of the NE face of the Piz Badile in 1955.

== Career ==
After graduation he worked as an exploration geologist in Canada from 1956 to 1958. Soon after his return to the UK he was appointed as Principal of the White Hall Centre for Open Country Pursuits, near Buxton, (1959–63) which had been established in 1951 by Sir Jack Longland (in his role as Director of Education for Derbyshire). The centre employed a number of Britain's leading climbers as instructors and Langmuir appointed Joe Brown as the chief instructor.

From 1963 to 1969 he was the Principal of Glenmore Lodge Outdoor Centre near Aviemore. Prior to his appointment, Glenmore was known for hosting residential courses for schoolchildren, but under Langmuir's influence its focus moved towards providing specialised training in mountain skills, particularly for aspiring mountain leaders. His responsibilities at Glenmore included mountain rescue, and he was leader of the Glenmore rescue team from 1963 to 1969 and also became rescue co-ordinator for the northern Cairngorms. He later became a member of the Mountain Rescue Committee of Scotland and was its chairman from 1968.

After his stint at Glenmore, he was appointed to set up an outdoor education unit at Moray House in Edinburgh, where he worked from 1970 to 1975 and became a senior lecturer. Whilst there he published the first of his papers relating to snow conditions and avalanche risk, work he had started whilst at Glenmore, that and a following publication established a framework for a better understanding of avalanche risk in the Scottish mountains.

In 1976, he became Assistant Director of the Lothian Department of Leisure Service, where his responsibilities included the Hillend ski centre, which had been opened ten years earlier as Britain's largest artificial ski centre, a new sailing training centre at Port Edgar and the setting-up of the Pentland Hills Regional Park.

== Work in mountain training and safety ==
Whilst at White Hall he joined the Mountain Leadership working party under Longland (1962–64). One outcome was the establishment of a training programme for the Mountain Leadership Certificate, and by late 1964 that programme was fully operational in England. When the Scottish Mountain Leader Training Board was formed in 1964, Langmuir became a leading member.

Langmuir was asked to initiate and edit a new handbook for all those taking part in the Board's training schemes, and the resulting book, Mountaincraft and Leadership, was first published in 1969. Later editions of the book, which included a refinement Naismith's rule, were jointly published by the Scottish Sports Council (later to become SportScotland) and the Mountain Leader Training Board, more than 150,000 copies of those first three editions were sold. In 2013, after his death a fourth, revised, edition was published. The book remains in print 20 years after his death and is "the indispensable bible for all who would take parties of young people into the hills".

Whilst he was at Glenmore Lodge, Langmuir and Fred Harper (who succeeded Langmuir as principal at Glenmore), along with Hamish MacInnes, were actively pursuing ways in which they might improve awareness and understanding of avalanche risk in the Scottish mountains. Their initiatives led to the establishment of the Scottish Avalanche Project in 1988 and the Scottish Avalanche Information Service, which continues to be funded by Sportscotland.

== Honours ==
In recognition of his pioneering work on avalanche prognosis in Scotland, for his publications and his personal contribution to outdoor education and safety in the mountains, Langmuir was elected a Fellow of the Royal Society of Edinburgh in 1978. In 1986, he was awarded an MBE in the New Year Honours "For services to Mountaineering in Scotland." In 1993 the British Association of Ski Instructors named him Honorary President.
