= E. Bruce Watson =

American geochemist

- Born: October 16, 1950 (age 75)
- Education: University of New Hampshire
- Alma mater: MIT
- Awards: Murchison Medal, Roebling Medal
- Scientific career
- Fields: geochemistry
- Institutions: Rensselaer Polytechnic Institute

Edward Bruce Watson (born 16 October 1950) is an American geochemist at Rensselaer Polytechnic Institute in Troy, New York.

== Education and career ==
Watson received in 1972 his bachelor's degree in geology from the University of New Hampshire and in 1976 his Ph.D. from the Massachusetts Institute of Technology in geochemistry. As a postdoc, he worked at the Carnegie Institution of Washington. In 1977, Watson became an assistant professor of geochemistry at Rensselaer Polytechnic Institute and was subsequently promoted to associate professor and full professor. Since 2011, he has also held a professorship of materials science and engineering. He was a visiting researcher in 1980 at Macquarie University in Sydney and in 1984 at the Max Planck Institute for Chemistry in Mainz.

Watson's research deals mostly (but not exclusively) with the geochemistry of the deep Earth inaccessible to drilling or other direct observation. He studies the chemical composition and materials present in these deep regions and their changes over geologic time. The geochemistry of Earth's deep crust and upper mantle (down to depths of about 150 kilometers) are studied in his laboratory through the design and execution of experiments involving high temperatures and high pressures.

His research has included the following topics:

partitioning of trace elements between minerals, silicate melts and fluids;
atomic and molecular diffusion in crystals, silicate melts and supercritical water;
equilibrium and kinetic properties of low abundance minerals that sequester geochemically-important isotopes and trace elements;
wetting behavior of melts (silicate, carbonate and metallic) and supercritical fluids in rocks;
permeability of (and bulk diffusion in) polyphase materials consisting of crystals and fluid;
and dissolution kinetics of minerals in silicate melts.

== Awards and honors ==
- 1983 — F.W. Clarke Medal of the Geochemical Society
- 1996 — Fellow of the American Academy of Arts and Sciences
- 1997 — Member of the National Academy of Sciences
- 1998 — President of the Mineralogical Society of America (one year term)
- 1998 — Arthur L. Day Medal, Geological Society of America
- 1999 — R.A. Daly Lecturer, American Geophysical Union
- 2005 — V. M. Goldschmidt Award of the Geochemical Society
- 2006 — Walter H. Bucher Medal, American Geophysical Union
- 2011 — Murchison Medal, Geological Society of London
- 2018 — Roebling Medal, Mineralogical Society of America
