= Ruth Blake =

American geochemist and environmental scientist

- Education: Wayne State University (BS); University of Texas (MS); University of Michigan (PhD)
- Scientific career
- Fields: Geology, Geochemistry, Engineering, Environmental Sciences
- Workplaces: Yale University

Ruth E. Blake is an American geochemist and environmental scientist. She is a professor at Yale University in earth & planetary sciences, environmental studies, and chemical & environmental engineering. Blake's work focuses on marine biogeochemical processes, paleoclimate, astrobiology, and stable isotope geochemistry.

== Education ==
Ruth Blake completed a B.S. degree in geology from Wayne State University in 1987 and a M.S degree in hydrogeology from the University of Texas in 1992. She earned a Ph.D. in geochemistry from University of Michigan in 1998. Blake's doctoral research focused on how microbial activity can affect oxygen isotopes in phosphates.

== Career and research ==
While a professor at Yale, Blake expanded on her graduate research focus using isotopic evidence in ancient marine phosphates to show that there was significant biological activity in the ocean during the Archean era.

Blake has worked on numerous other research topics related to biological and/or chemical activity in oceans, sediments, and soils. She has worked on methods development in isotope geochemistry. Her current research focus in on stable oxygen isotope geochemistry analysis.

== Awards and honors ==
Blake was the 2002 winner of the F.W. Clarke Medal from the Geochemical Society.
