= Jean Morrison =

Jean Morrison may refer to:

- Jean Morrison (musician)
- Jean Morrison (professor)
