= Patricia Dove =

American geochemist and crystal growth researcher

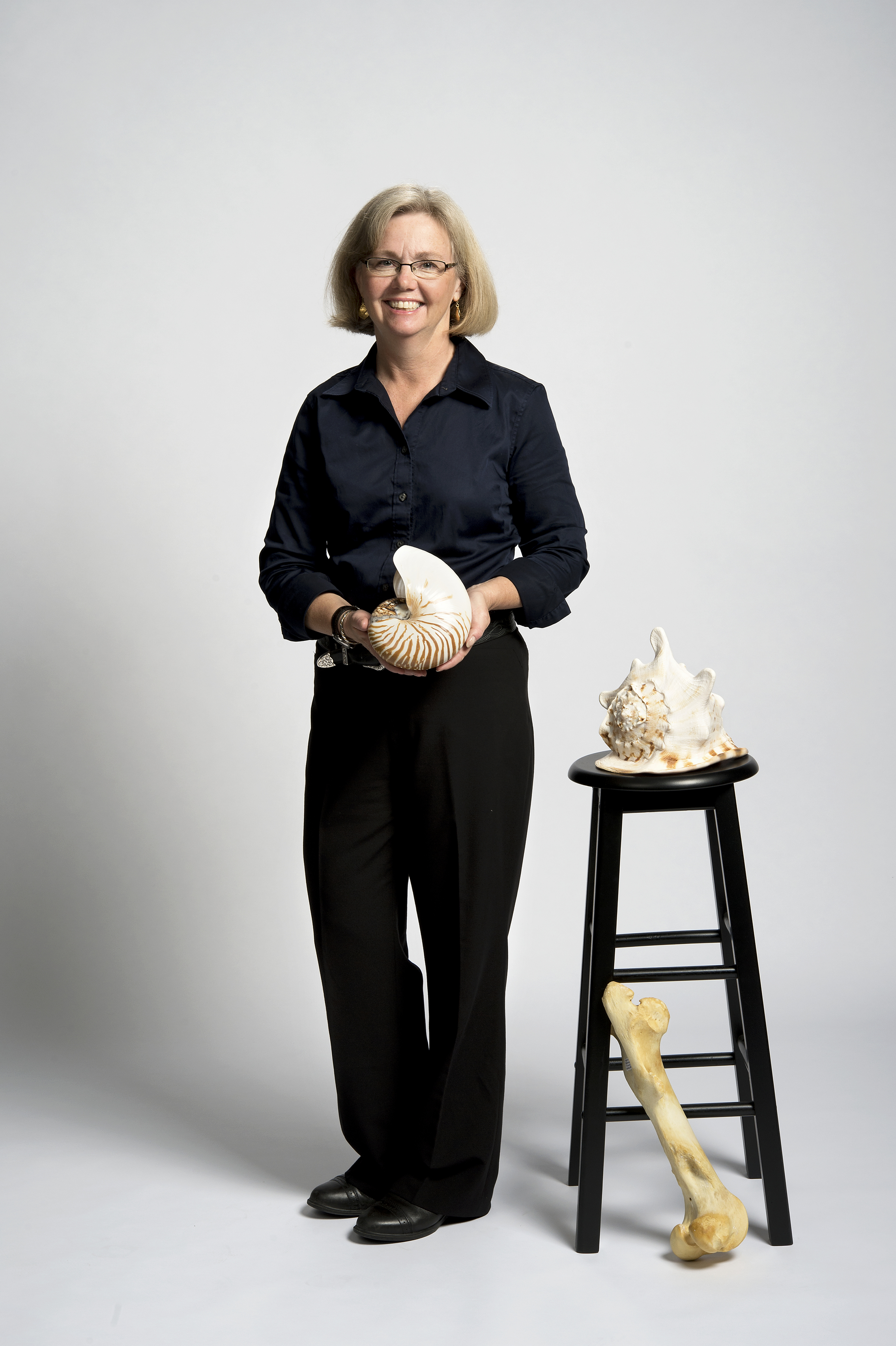
- Born: Patricia Ann Martin; September 12, 1958; Bedford County, Virginia
- Education: Virginia Polytechnic Institute and State University (MS, BS); Princeton University (PhD)
- Awards: Dana Medal (2014); National Academy of Sciences (2012); F.W. Clarke Medal (1996)
- Scientific career
- Fields: Biomineralization; Weathering; Mineral Surface Science; Carbonate Minerals; Silicas; Kinetics; Thermodynamics
- Workplaces: Virginia Tech; Georgia Institute of Technology; Stanford University
- Thesis: Quartz Dissolution Kinetics in Electrolyte Solutions (1991)
- Doctoral advisors: Alexandra Navrotsky, David Crerar (deceased)
- Website: geos.vt.edu/people/faculty.html

Patricia Martin Dove is an American geochemist. She is a university distinguished professor and the C.P. Miles Professor of Science at Virginia Tech with appointments in the department of Geosciences, department of Chemistry, and department of Materials Science and Engineering. Her research focuses on the kinetics and thermodynamics of mineral reactions with aqueous solutions in biogeochemical systems. Much of her work is on crystal nucleation and growth during biomineralization and biomaterial interactions with mineralogical systems. She was elected a member of the National Academy of Sciences (NAS) in 2012, where she currently serves as chair of the Geology Section and is the immediate-past chair of Class I, Physical and Mathematical Sciences.

== Family and education ==
Dove grew up on a working farm in Bedford County, Virginia. With the encouragement of her parents, she became interested in science as a child, collecting specimens of tree leaves and Indian arrowhead artifacts in the Piedmont region of Virginia. Dove participated in the local science fairs and presented her research projects on plant growth at the Virginia Junior Academy of Science and the 1976 Westinghouse International Science and Engineering Fair, which later became the Intel International Science and Engineering Fair.

She studied soil science and plant physiology in the Department of Agronomy at Virginia Tech and earned the bachelor's degree in 1980. Under the advisement of J. Donald Rimstidt, she further earned the Master's degree in environmental geochemistry at Virginia Tech with investigations of scorodite solubility and the geochemistry of Brinton Arsenic Mine. Dove completed a PhD degree in 1991 at Princeton University, where she worked with David Crerar to develop the hydrothermal mixed flow reactor (MFR). Using the MFR, she determined the hydrothermal dissolution kinetics of quartz in electrolyte solutions and dissolution of the isostructural sulfate minerals- celestine, anglesite and baryte. Dove subsequently received a National Science Foundation Postdoctoral Fellowship (1991-1993) to work with Michael Hochella in investigations of mineral surface-water interactions at Stanford University using the newly-developed atomic force microscope.

Patricia Dove was born to Fuller Emerson Martin and Lou Ellen Martin, the oldest of four children. She met Joseph Dove at Virginia Tech, and they married in September 1980. They have a daughter, Meredith Dove, and a son, Emerson Dove. Patricia Dove has a life-long passion for horses and has competed in the dressage and reining disciplines.

== Career and research ==
Dove was an assistant and tenured associate professor in the School of Earth and Atmospheric Sciences at the Georgia Institute of Technology from 1993 to 2000. She returned to her Alma mater, Virginia Polytechnic Institute and State University, in 2000 and leads the Biogeochemistry of Earth Processes research group. In 2008, Dove was appointed the C.P. Miles Professor of Science. In 2013, she was named a university distinguished professor.

Dove and collaborators have made notable contributions to understanding mineral-water interactions in silica geochemistry (gca, pnas_ab) and the biomineralisation of carbonate mineral systems. She combines chemical principles with nanoanalysis and in-situ measurements of crystal nucleation, growth, and dissolution reactions.

Using in situ Atomic Force Microscopy they show how elemental impurities are incorporated into the minerals of shells to affect the chemical composition and can be used to reconstruct past environmental conditions. Dove demonstrated that temperature and the magnesium carbonate availability can alter the composition and crystal form of minerals. Other work demonstrated the amino acids and peptides in macromolecules often associated with biomineralizing tissues can act as crystal growth promoters or inhibitors to regulate the rate of skeletal formation.

In 2003, Dove led an international endeavor to establish current knowledge of the chemical processes that control biomineralisation and called for an interdisciplinary endeavor to advance the field using new quantitative and high-resolution experimental and theoretical methods (Napa, California). Over the next decade, many biominerals and synthetic biomaterials were determined to involve small particles rather than by classical crystallization. In 2013, she organized an interdisciplinary workshop to find consensus for the basis of these observations (Berkeley, California). A multi-disciplinary consensus emerged for the concept of Crystallization by Particle Attachment (CPA) that was published in Science and rapidly showing applications to diverse fields. The physical-chemical model for non-classical crystallization hypothesizes how an interplay of thermodynamic and kinetic factors allow the multiple pathways to crystal formation that are observed.

Dove is a charter member of the Virginia Academy of Science, Engineering, and Medicine. The Virginia Academy of Science, Engineering, and Medicine (VASEM) was co-founded by Senator Mark Warner and the presidents of Virginia's research universities in collaboration with members of the National Academy of Sciences, National Academy of Engineering, and National Academy of Medicine who live or work in the Commonwealth of Virginia. As a state academy, VASEM provides technical expertise to the Virginia government. In 2016, Dove was appointed the second president of VASEM (2016-2019).

== Awards and honors ==
- 1995 Georgia Institute of Technology AMOCO CETL Junior Faculty Teaching Award
- 1996 Geochemical Society F.W. Clarke Medal
- 1999 United States Department of Energy Best University Research Award
- 2000 Mineralogical Society of America Fellow
- 2005 United States Department of Energy Best University Research Award
- 2008 American Geophysical Union Fellow
- 2010 Geochemical Society
- 2010 European Association of Geochemistry Fellow
- 2012 National Academy of Sciences Elected member
- 2013 Office of the Governor of Virginia Outstanding Scientist Award
- 2014 Mineralogical Society of America Dana Medal
- 2016 Virginia Museum of Natural History Thomas Jefferson Medal
- 2022 International Mineralogical Association - Medal of Excellence in Mineralogical Sciences.

== Selected publications ==
- Mergelsberg, S.T. and collaborators (2020). "Metastable solubility and local structure of amorphous calcium carbonate (ACC)". Geochimica et Cosmochimica Acta. 289: 196–206. Bibcode:2020GeCoA.289..196M. doi:10.1016/j.gca.2020.06.030. S2CID 225540070.
- Mergelsberg, S.T. and collaborators (2019). "Composition Systematics in the Exoskeleton of the American Lobster, Homarus americanus and Implications for Malacostraca". Frontiers in Earth Science. 7: 69. Bibcode:2019FrEaS...7...69M. doi:10.3389/feart.2019.00069. hdl:10919/95055.
- De Yoreo, J.J. and collaborators (2015). "Crystallization by particle attachment in synthetic, biogenic, and geologic environments" (PDF). Science. 349 (6247) aaa6760. doi:10.1126/science.aaa6760. PMID 26228157. S2CID 14742194.
- Giuffre, A.J. and collaborators (2013). "Polysaccharide chemistry regulates kinetics of calcite nucleation through competition of interfacial energies". Proceedings of the National Academy of Sciences of the United States of America. 110 (23): 9261–9266. Bibcode:2013PNAS..110.9261G. doi:10.1073/pnas.1222162110. PMC 3677451. PMID 23690577.
- Wang, D. and collaborators (2015). "Carboxylated molecules regulate magnesium content of amorphous calcium carbonates during calcification". Proceedings of the National Academy of Sciences of the United States of America. 106 (51): 21511–21516. doi:10.1073/pnas.0906741106. PMC 2799890. PMID 19955417.
- Dove, P.M. and collaborators (2008). "Kinetics of amorphous silica dissolution and the paradox of the silica polymorphs". Proceedings of the National Academy of Sciences of the United States of America. 102 (29): 15357–15362. Bibcode:2008PNAS..105.9903D. doi:10.1073/pnas.0803798105. PMC 2481359. PMID 18632576.
- Dove, P.M. and collaborators (2008). "Mechanisms of classical crystal growth theory explain the dissolution and growth kinetics of quartz and silicate minerals". Proceedings of the National Academy of Sciences of the United States of America. 105 (43): 9903–9908. doi:10.1073/pnas.0507777102. PMC 1266142. PMID 16230632.
- Elhadj, S. and collaborators (2006). "Role of molecular charge and hydrophilicity in regulating the kinetics of crystal growth". Proceedings of the National Academy of Sciences of the United States of America. 103 (51): 19237–19242. Bibcode:2006PNAS..10319237E. doi:10.1073/pnas.0605748103. PMC 1748210. PMID 17158220.
- Dove, P. M. and S. Weiner (2003). "An overview of biomineralization processes and the problem of the vital effect". Reviews in Mineralogy and Geochemistry. 54 (1): 1–29. Bibcode:2003RvMG...54....1W. doi:10.2113/0540001.
- Orme, C. A.; Noy, A.; Wierzbicki, A.; McBride, M. T.; Grantham, M.; Teng, H. H.; Dove, P. M.; DeYoreo, J. J. (June 2001). "Formation of chiral morphologies through selective binding of amino acids to calcite surface steps". Nature. 411 (6839): 775–779. Bibcode:2001Natur.411..775O. doi:10.1038/35081034. PMID 11459051. S2CID 4419411.
- Davis, K.J. and collaborators (2000). "The Role of Mg2+ as an Impurity in Calcite Growth". Science. 290 (5494): 1134–1137. Bibcode:2000Sci...290.1134D. doi:10.1126/science.290.5494.1134. PMID 11073446.
- Teng, H.H. and collaborators (1998). "Thermodynamics of Calcite Growth: Baseline for Understanding Biomineral Formation". Science. 290 (5389): 724–727. Bibcode:1998Sci...282..724T. doi:10.1126/science.282.5389.724. PMID 9784126.
- Dove, P.M. and D.A. Crerar (1990). "Kinetics of quartz dissolution in electrolyte solutions using a hydrothermal mixed flow reactor". Geochimica et Cosmochimica Acta. 54 (4): 955–969. Bibcode:1990GeCoA..54..955D. doi:10.1016/0016-7037(90)90431-J.
