= Eiichi Takahashi =

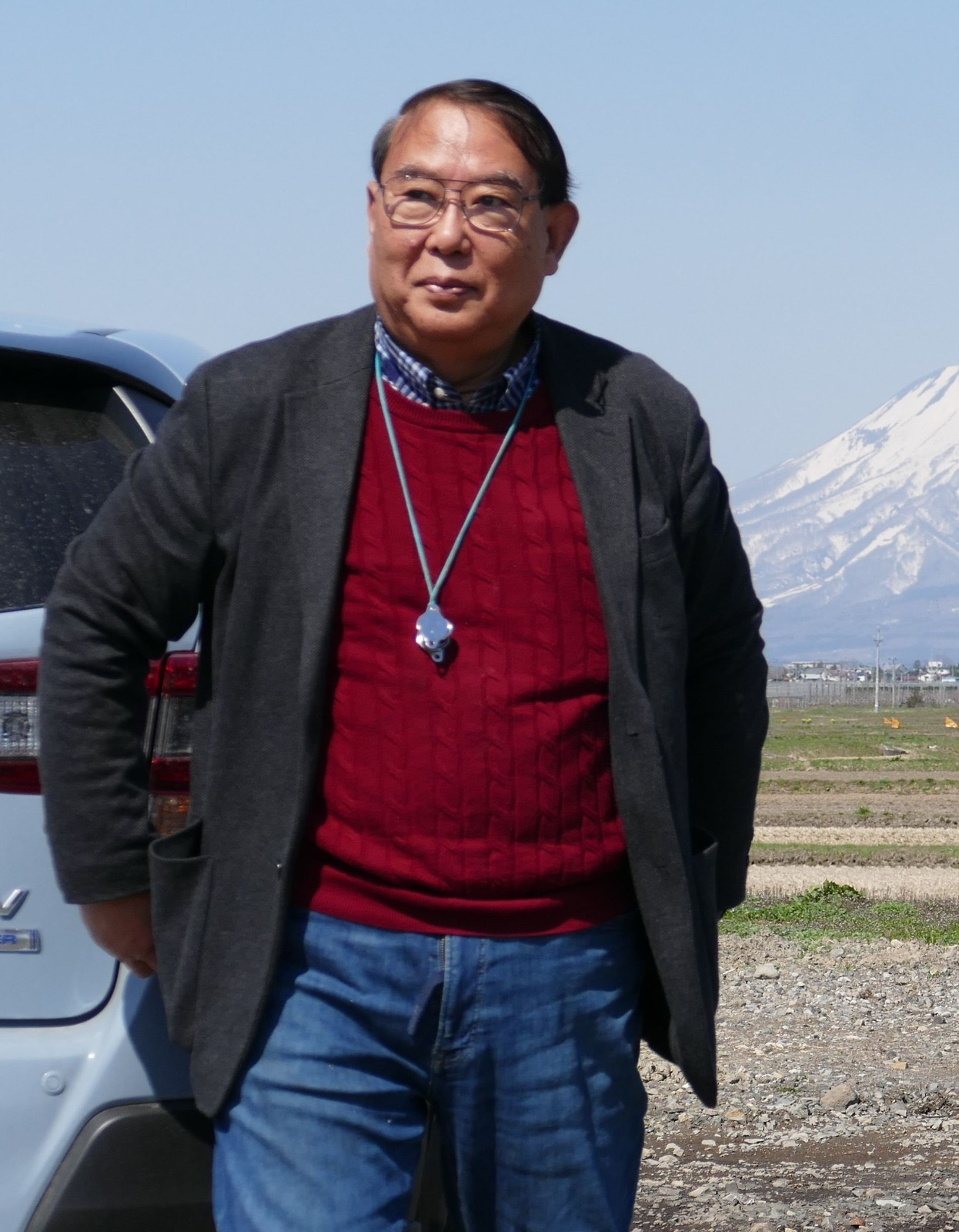
- Born: November 1951 (age 74–75); Hamamatsu, Japan
- Occupations: Geoscientist and academic

Academic background
- Education: BS., Geophysics; MS., Petrology; PhD., Petrology
- Alma mater: University of Tokyo

Academic work
- Institutions: Guangzhou Institute of Geochemistry, Chinese Academy of Sciences

Eiichi Takahashi (高橋 栄一, Takahashi Eiichi; born November 1951) is a Japanese geoscientist and academic. He is a research professor at the Guangzhou Institute of Geochemistry, Chinese Academy of Sciences.

Takahashi's research encompasses high-pressure experiments and the study of mantle and volcanic rocks to investigate magma genesis, deep mantle processes, and mineral phase transitions. He is a union fellow of the American Geophysical Union and was awarded the F.W. Clarke Medal from the Geochemical Society in 1987, as well as the Japan Medal of Honor with Purple Ribbon in 2018.

== Education ==
Takahashi earned a B.S. in Geophysics in 1974, followed by an M.S. in Petrology in 1976, and a Ph.D. in Petrology in 1979, all from the University of Tokyo.

== Career ==
Takahashi began his academic career as a post-doctoral fellow at the Geophysical Laboratory, Carnegie Institute of Washington, in 1979, and he became an assistant professor at Okayama University in 1981. He joined the Tokyo Institute of Technology as an associate professor in 1988 and was later appointed professor in 1994, a role he held until 2017. During this time, he was also a center leader of the 21^{st} Century COE "How to build a habitable planet?" of MEXT (the Ministry of Education, Culture, Sports, Science and Technology) from 2004 to 2008 and area representative for a research grant on geofluids from 2009 to 2013. Subsequently, from 2013 to 2017, he directed the Tokyo Institute of Technology Library. Since 2017, he has been a research professor at the Guangzhou Institute of Geochemistry, Chinese Academy of Sciences.

== Research ==
Takahashi has carried out studies on volcanic rocks and the mantle. His experimental research on high-pressure partial melting of spinel lherzolite with Ikuo Kushiro has documented melt compositions at 1 GPa and recorded variations in elements like FeO and MgO. He extended the melting study of mantle peridotite to higher pressures using a multi-anvil setup and analyzed the melting of peridotite KLB-1 up to 20 GPa, identifying phase relations, compositions of melts, and solid residues. Based on this work, he discussed the origin of the Archean komatiite magma and proposed melting peridotite in the upper mantle or transition regions. Together with Eiji Ito, he showed that the postspinel transition in Mg_{2}SiO_{4}–Fe_{2}SiO_{4} occurs across a narrow range of pressure at 1600 °C, emphasizing the idea that this abrupt transformation is the cause of seismic discontinuity at 670 km depth. He noted that peridotite xenoliths from the southwestern Japan arc have higher equilibrium temperatures compared to those from the northeastern Japan arc.

Takahashi headed a team of scientists that conducted a research project to study the underwater part of the Hawaiian volcanoes by using submersibles. The outcomes of this work were published in Hawaiian Volcanoes: Deep Underwater Perspectives, which was recognized as the best book in geography and earth science by the Association of American Publishers in 2002.

In a collaborative study, Takahashi found small alkalic volcanoes, petit spots, on the Pacific Plate formed by small asthenospheric melts that rise through flexure-induced fractures in 95 km-thick lithosphere. His work contended that ocean island basalts are from fertile mantle and not hot mantle, and suggested that Columbia River Basalts are produced by high-degree melting of recycled oceanic crust with pyroxenite lithologies within an inhomogeneous plume head, and pooling and eruption of the melts as large basaltic flows.

== Awards and honors ==
- 1987 – Geochemical Society F.W. Clarke Medal
- 2015 – Volcanological Society of Japan Award
- 2016 – American Geophysical Union Fellow
- 2018 – Japan Geoscience Union Fellow
- 2018 – Medal with Purple Ribbon

== Selected articles ==
- Takahashi, Eiichi; Kushiro, Ikuo (1983). "Melting of a dry peridotite at high pressures and basalt magma genesis". American Mineralogist. 68 (9–10): 859–879.
- Takahashi, Eiichi (1986). "Melting of a dry peridotite KLB-1 up to 14 GPa: Implications on the origin of peridotitic upper mantle". Journal of Geophysical Research: Solid Earth. 91 (B9): 9367–9382. Bibcode:1986JGR....91.9367T. doi:10.1029/JB091iB09p09367.
- Ito, Eiji; Takahashi, Eiichi (1989). "Postspinel transformations in the system Mg₂SiO₄–Fe₂SiO₄ and some geophysical implications". Journal of Geophysical Research: Solid Earth. 94 (B8): 10637–10646. doi:10.1029/JB094iB08p10637.
- Takahashi, Eiichi; Nakajima, Katsuji; Wright, Thomas L. (1998). "Origin of the Columbia River basalts: melting model of a heterogeneous plume head". Earth and Planetary Science Letters. 162 (1–4): 63–80. Bibcode:1998E&PSL.162...63T. doi:10.1016/S0012-821X(98)00157-5.
- Kogiso, Tetsu; Hirose, Kei; Takahashi, Eiichi (1998). "Melting experiments on homogeneous mixtures of peridotite and basalt: application to the genesis of ocean island basalts". Earth and Planetary Science Letters. 162 (1–4): 45–61. Bibcode:1998E&PSL.162...45K. doi:10.1016/S0012-821X(98)00156-3.
- Hirano, Naoto; Takahashi, Eiichi; Yamamoto, Junji; Abe, Natsue; Ingle, Stephanie P.; Kaneoka, Ichiro; Hirata, Takafumi; Kimura, Jun-Ichi; Ishii, Teruaki; Ogawa, Yujiro; Machida, Shiki; Suyehiro, Kiyoshi (2006). "Volcanism in Response to Plate Flexure". Science. 313 (5792): 1426–1428. Bibcode:2006Sci...313.1426H. doi:10.1126/science.1128235. PMID 16873612.
- Wang, Jintuan; Takahashi, Eiichi; Xiong, Xiaolin; Chen, Linli; Li, Li; Suzuki, Toshihiro; Walter, Michael (2020). "The water-saturated solidus and second critical endpoint of peridotite: Implications for magma genesis within the mantle wedge". Journal of Geophysical Research: Solid Earth. 125 (8) e2020JB019452. Bibcode:2020JGRB..12519452W. doi:10.1029/2020JB019452.
