= Edward M. Stolper =

American geologist

President of the California Institute of Technology
- Interim
- In office July 1, 2013 – June 30, 2014
- Preceded by: Jean-Lou Chameau
- Succeeded by: Thomas Rosenbaum
- Website: www.gps.caltech.edu/people/edward-m-stolper
- Scientific career
- Education: Harvard College (BS); University of Edinburgh (MS); Harvard University (PhD)
- Fields: Geology; Planetary science
- Workplaces: California Institute of Technology
- Thesis: Igneous petrology of differentiated meteorites (1979)
- Doctoral advisor: James F. Hays
- Other academic advisors: Michael John O'Hara (MS)

Edward Manin Stolper (born December 16, 1952) is an American geologist, petrologist, and planetologist. He is known for his research on igneous rocks (terrestrial and extraterrestrial) and volatiles in igneous processes, especially his research involving "pioneering experiments defining the behavior of volatiles in silicate melts and glasses."

== Biography ==
Stolper graduated in 1974 with a bachelor's degree in geosciences from Harvard College and in 1976 with a master's degree in geology from the University of Edinburgh under the supervision of Michael John O'Hara. In 1979 he received his Ph.D. in geosciences from Harvard University under the supervision of James F. Hays. His Ph.D. thesis is entitled Igneous petrology of differentiated meteorites. At California Institute of Technology (Caltech), Stolper was from 1979 to 1982 an assistant professor, from 1982 to 1983 an associate professor, and from 1983 to 1990 a professor. At Caltech he held the Leonhard Professorship from 1990 to 2019, the Millikan Professorship from 2020 to 2021, a Distinguished Professorship from 2021 to 2022, and the Hufstedler Professorship of Geology from 2022 to the present. At Caltech he held the office of Provost from 2007 to 2017 and was Interim President in 2013–2014.

Stolper's research deals with the formation and development of igneous rocks in the Solar System. He has an international reputation for his geological and petrological expertise in field studies, laboratory investigations, computer simulations and theoretical considerations. He and his colleagues have examined samples from Earth, Moon and Mars, as well as from various meteorites. He made important contributions to NASA's robotic space mission using the Mars rover named Curiosity. He contributed significantly to scientific understanding of the melting processes in the interior of planets, as well as elucidating the importance of water, carbon dioxide, fluorine, and sulfur in such melting processes.

Since 1973, Edward and Lauren Beth Stolper have been married. At Caltech she is Director of Fellowships Advising and Study Abroad (FASA). The couple's daughter and son are both Harvard graduates: Jennifer (Harvard class of 2005) and Daniel (Harvard class of 2008). Daniel Aaron Stolper has a Ph.D. in geobiology from Caltech.

== Awards and honors ==
- 1985 F.W. Clarke Medal of the Geochemical Society
- 1986 James B. Macelwane Medal of the American Geophysical Union
- 1991 elected to American Academy of Arts and Sciences
- 1994 elected a Member of National Academy of Sciences
- 1997 Arthur Holmes Medal of the European Geosciences Union
- 2004 Arthur L. Day Medal of the Geological Society of America
- 2008 honorary doctorate from the University of Edinburgh
- 2010 elected a Foreign Member of Academia Europaea
- 2011 elected a Foreign Member of the Royal Society
- 2012 V. M. Goldschmidt Award of the Geochemical Society
- 2012 honorary doctorate from the Hebrew University of Jerusalem
- 2017 Roebling Medal of the Mineralogical Society of America
- 2018 honorary doctorate from the University of Bristol
- 2019 Wollaston Medal of the Geological Society of London

The mineral stolperite is named in honor of Edward Stolper.

== Selected publications ==
- Walker, D.; Grove, T.L.; Longhi, J.; Stolper, E.M.; Hays, J.F. (1973). "Origin of lunar feldspathic rocks". Earth and Planetary Science Letters. 20 (3): 325–336. Bibcode:1973E&PSL..20..325W. doi:10.1016/0012-821X(73)90006-X.
- Eckert, Hellmut; Yesinowski, James P.; Silver, Lynn A.; Stolper, Edward M. (1988). "Water in silicate glasses: Quantitation and structural studies by proton solid echo and magic angle spinning NMR methods". The Journal of Physical Chemistry. 92 (7): 2055–2064. doi:10.1021/j100318a070.
- Dixon, Jacqueline Eaby; Clague, David A.; Stolper, Edward M. (1991). "Degassing History of Water, Sulfur, and Carbon in Submarine Lavas from Kilauea Volcano, Hawaii". The Journal of Geology. 99 (3): 371–394. Bibcode:1991JG.....99..371D. doi:10.1086/629501. S2CID 51816684.
- Blank, J.G.; Stolper, E.M.; Carroll, M.R. (1993). "Solubilities of carbon dioxide and water in rhyolitic melt at 850°C and 750 bars". Earth and Planetary Science Letters. 119 (1–2): 27–36. Bibcode:1993E&PSL.119...27B. doi:10.1016/0012-821X(93)90004-S.
- Dixon, J. E.; Stolper, E. M.; Holloway, J. R. (1995). "An Experimental Study of Water and Carbon Dioxide Solubilities in Mid-Ocean Ridge Basaltic Liquids. Part I: Calibration and Solubility Models". Journal of Petrology. doi:10.1093/oxfordjournals.petrology.a037267.
- Dixon, J. E.; Stolper, E. M.; Holloway, J. R. (1995). "An Experimental Study of Water and Carbon Dioxide Solubilities in Mid-Ocean Ridge Basaltic Liquids. Part II: Applications to Degassing". Journal of Petrology. doi:10.1093/oxfordjournals.petrology.a037268.
- Hirschmann, M. M.; Stolper, E. M. (1996). "A possible role for garnet pyroxenite in the origin of the "garnet signature" in MORB". Contributions to Mineralogy and Petrology. 124 (2): 185–208. Bibcode:1996CoMP..124..185H. doi:10.1007/s004100050184. S2CID 140565376.
- Eiler, John M.; Farley, Kenneth A.; Valley, John W.; Hauri, Erik; Craig, Harmon; Hart, Stanley R.; Stolper, Edward M. (1997). "Oxygen isotope variations in ocean island basalt phenocrysts". Geochimica et Cosmochimica Acta. 61 (11): 2281–2293. Bibcode:1997GeCoA..61.2281E. doi:10.1016/S0016-7037(97)00075-6.
- Hirschmann, Marc M.; Kogiso, Tetsu; Baker, Michael B.; Stolper, Edward M. (2003). "Alkalic magmas generated by partial melting of garnet pyroxenite". Geology. 31 (6): 481. Bibcode:2003Geo....31..481H. doi:10.1130/0091-7613(2003)031<0481:AMGBPM>2.0.CO;2. ISSN 0091-7613.
- Pilet, SéBastien; Baker, Michael B.; Stolper, Edward M. (2008). "Metasomatized Lithosphere and the Origin of Alkaline Lavas". Science. 320 (5878): 916–919. Bibcode:2008Sci...320..916P. doi:10.1126/science.1156563. PMID 18487189. S2CID 1009715.
- Vielzeuf, D.; Floquet, N.; Chatain, D.; Bonnete, F.; Ferry, D.; Garrabou, J.; Stolper, E. M. (2010). "Multilevel modular mesocrystalline organization in red coral". American Mineralogist. 95 (2–3): 242–248. Bibcode:2010AmMin..95..242V. doi:10.2138/am.2010.3268. S2CID 36309373.
- Stolper, E. M.; et al. (2013). "The Petrochemistry of Jake_M: A Martian Mugearite". Science. 341 (6153). Bibcode:2013Sci...341E...4S. doi:10.1126/science.1239463. PMID 24072927. S2CID 16515295.

Academic offices
Preceded by Jean-Lou Chameau	Interim President of the California Institute of Technology; 2013 – 2014	Succeeded by Thomas Rosenbaum
