= Anat Shahar =

Geochemist

Anat Shahar is a staff scientist and the Vice President for Research at the Earth and Planets Laboratory, Carnegie Institution of Washington and adjunct professor at the University of Maryland. Her work uses high-pressure, high-temperature experiments and stable isotope geochemistry to understand the formation of planets in the Solar System.

== Early life ==
Anat Shahar was born in Israel on April 10, 1980. She moved then moved to New Jersey at age 6.

== Career ==
Shahar obtained a B.S. and a M.E. in geological engineering and geological sciences from Cornell University in 2002 and 2003, respectively. She earned her Ph.D. in geochemistry from the University of California, Los Angeles in 2008, while working in the lab of Edward Young. She went on to complete her postdoctoral research at the geophysical laboratory, Carnegie Institution of Washington and in 2009 was appointed staff scientist. Since 2012 she also has served as an adjunct assistant professor in the department of geology at the University of Maryland. Shahar now works as the Vice President for Research at Carnegie Science.

Shahar was awarded the Nininger Meteorite Award, which recognizes outstanding student achievement in the meteoritical sciences, for her 2008 paper on "Astrophysics of CAI formation as revealed by silicon isotope LA-MC-ICPMS of an igneous CAI". In 2012 Shahar was awarded Stanford University's Blaustein Fellowship, which helped fund her work investigating the pressure-dependent relationship of the isotopic composition of iron alloys, published in Science. In 2015, Shahar won the F.W. Clarke Medal, an award from the Geochemical Society that recognizes a single outstanding contribution to geochemistry or cosmochemistry by an early-career scientist. Shahar won the 2016 Mineralogical Society of America's Young Investigator Award, given to individuals near the beginning of their professional careers, who have made outstanding published contributions to the field of mineralogy. The award also made her a Life Fellow of the society. Shahar also served as geochemistry secretary for the Volcanology, Geochemistry, and Petrology Section of the American Geophysical Union during 2017-2018. Over the course of her career, she has contributed to over thirty scientific publications.

== Research initiatives ==
In her research, Shahar investigates how planets in the solar system formed and evolved through lab experiments that simulate the high temperature and pressure conditions that occur within Earth and other planets. She is the first person to perform stable isotope geochemistry experiments with high-temperature materials. Her lab group determines how these conditions alter the ratios of isotopes in different planetary materials. Shahar utilizes this method to understand planetary processes ranging from the formation of the first solids in the solar system, CAIs, to core formation.

Shahar measured the silicon isotope fractionation during silicate and iron interaction in experiments that simulate the formation of a metallic core and surrounding mantle, such as occurred during Earth's formation. The experiments suggest that silicon may be one of the lighter elements that make up Earth’s core, along with iron and nickel. Shahar’s lab group also investigates how the presence of magnesium, sulfur, and nickel affect iron isotopic fractionation in planetary and asteroid materials.
