= Michael John O'Hara =

British geologist and mountaineer

Michael John O'Hara FRS FRSE FLSW
- Born: 22 February 1933
- Died: 24 November 2014 (aged 81)
- Occupations: geologist, igneous petrologist

Michael John O'Hara (22 February 1933 — 24 November 2014) was a British geologist who specialised in igneous petrology.

Born in Sydney, Australia, and raised in the UK, O'Hara began his geology studies at Peterhouse, Cambridge, where he spent the period 1952–58, and was awarded both his undergraduate and PhD degrees.

In 1958, he took up a position at the University of Edinburgh in the Grant Institute of Geology. He was appointed to a personal chair in 1970. During this time, he spent some time at the Geophysical Laboratory of the Carnegie Institute, and also served as a NASA principal investigator from 1967 to 1974, working on lunar rock samples from the Apollo missions.

In 1978, he moved from Edinburgh to become head of the geology department at University College of Wales Aberystwyth, where he remained until 1993. This period included academic postings at California Institute of Technology, Harvard University and Sultan Qaboos University, as well as national administerial duties with the Natural Environment Research Council (NERC). He was finally appointed Distinguished Research Professor at Cardiff University in 1993.

== Awards and recognition ==
O'Hara's made fundamental contributions to the understanding of the origin and evolution of basalts, and their chemical signatures. His “outstanding achievements in research of the constitution and evolution of the Earth and other planets” were recognised with a number of medals and awards, including the Murchison Medal of the Geological Society of London in 1983; the N. L. Bowen Medal of the American Geophysical Union in 1984; and the Harry H. Hess Medal of the American Geophysical Union in 2007.

He was elected a Fellow of the Royal Society of Edinburgh in 1969 and a Fellow of the Royal Society in 1981. He was a Founding Fellow of the Learned Society of Wales, when it was established in 2010.

== Mountaineering and rock climbing ==
Whilst an undergraduate in the 1950's, O'Hara climbed several significant alpine climbing routes in the European Alps and pioneered a range of new climbs in the UK, he took part in over 30 first ascents and several of his new routes in Scotland are still regarded as '3-star' classics in modern climbing guidebooks. In addition to several first ascents on other cliffs in the immediate area, he played a central part in the development of rock climbing on Carnmore crag in the Fisherfield Forest, being involved in ten of the first 13 climbs established there. One of his Carnmore rock climbs, Dragon (E1 5b), is featured in the compendium of classic UK rock climbs Hard Rock.

He also went with Eric Langmuir "to investigate a report that Eric's father had given of some rocks on Beinn Trilleachan that he had spotted when fishing on the loch and which might be of interest", where they made the first ascent of Sickle and of Spartan Slab (Spartan being another 3 star classic), and in doing this they established the first modern rock climbs on the Etive Slabs. Another 3 star classic route that he pioneered, after initial exploration with Langmuir, was Minus One Direct on the north face of Ben Nevis.
