= Rajdeep Dasgupta =

Indian American professor (born 1976)

- Born: 21 December 1976 (age 49)
- Awards: F.W. Clarke Medal; Packard Fellowship for Science and Engineering; James B. Macelwane Medal

Rajdeep Dasgupta is a professor of Earth, Environmental, and Planetary Sciences at Rice University. In his research, he studies the role of subsurface melting and magma on the origin and evolution of the Earth and other terrestrial planets.

== Career ==
Rajdeep Dasgupta earned his B.Sc. in 1998 and his M.Sc. in 2000 from Jadavpur University in Kolkata, India and completed his Ph.D. in geology at the University of Minnesota in 2006. Dasgupta was a postdoctoral research associate at the University of Minnesota, and then was a postdoctoral fellow at Lamont–Doherty Earth Observatory at Columbia University. He joined the faculty of Rice University in 2008 where he is now a professor. Dasgupta also is a visiting scientist with the Lunar and Planetary Institute and an associate editor with Geochimica et Cosmochimica Acta. He is a member of the American Geophysical Union, the Mineralogical Society of America, the Geochemical Society, and the Geological Society of America.

In 2011, Dasgupta received the F.W. Clarke Medal from the Geochemical Society, an award given to an early-career scientist for a single outstanding contribution to geochemistry or cosmochemistry. The American Geophysical Union awarded him the James B. Macelwane Medal in 2014. In 2012, he won the Hisashi Kuno award, given annually to an AGU member who has made outstanding contributions to the fields of volcanology, geochemistry or petrology.

== Research initiatives ==
Rajdeep Dasgupta is an expert on the deep carbon cycle and his research centers on how carbon, oxygen, and hydrogen in the mantle affect magma melting processes. He has created new models for how rocks melt in carbon-rich environments and calculated carbon’s solubility in the core. Dasgupta has developed a way to use major elements in magmas to estimate their source region and composition in the mantle. He also is researching sulfur solubility, to understand sulfur transport in subduction zones.
