= IAG =

IAG may refer to:

== Companies ==
- IA Financial Group, a Canadian Insurance Company
- Individualized Apparel Group, an American clothing holding company
- Independent Artist Group, talent agency
- Insurance Australia Group, an insurance company in Australia
- International Airlines Group, a holding company of Aer Lingus, British Airways, Iberia, Level and Vueling
- International Audio Group, a manufacturer of hi-fi equipment

== Other organisations ==
- International Association of Geoanalysts, an international not-for-profit learned society
- International Association of Geodesy, part of the International Union of Geodesy and Geophysics
- Louvain School of Management, formerly Institut d'Administration et de Gestion of the University of Louvain (UCLouvain)

== Other uses ==
- I Am Ghost, a post-hardcore band from Long Beach, California
- I Am Groot, a series of animated shorts
- IAG, airport code for Niagara Falls International Airport
- IAg, Immersion Silver plating, a conductor plating technology used for printed circuit boards
- Idiopathic adolescent gynecomastia, a medical condition
- Iraq Assistance Group, a former U.S. military command
- Microsoft Intelligent Application Gateway, a combined hardware and software computer product by Microsoft
