= Elements (journal) =

- Discipline: Mineralogy, geochemistry, petrology
- Language: English
- Edited by: Richard Harrison, Rebecca Lange, Janne Blichert-Toft

Publication details
- History: 2005-present
- Publisher: Consortium of scientific societies
- Frequency: Bimonthly
- Impact factor: 3.632 (2020)

Standard abbreviations
- ISO 4: Elements

Indexing
- CODEN: EOOCAG
- ISSN: 1811-5209 (print); 1811-5217 (web)
- LCCN: cn2005390011
- OCLC no.: 314493749

Links
- Journal homepage; Online archive

Elements: An International Magazine of Mineralogy, Geochemistry, and Petrology is a bimonthly peer-reviewed scientific journal published by 18 scientific societies: Mineralogical Society of America, Mineralogical Society of Great Britain and Ireland, Mineralogical Association of Canada, Clay Minerals Society, Geochemical Society, European Association of Geochemistry, International Association of GeoChemistry, Société Française de Minéralogie et de Cristallographie, Association of Applied Geochemists, Deutsche Mineralogische Gesellschaft, Società Italiana di Mineralogia e Petrologia, International Association of Geoanalysts, Polskie Towarzystwo Mineralogiczne (Mineralogical Society of Poland), Sociedad Española de Mineralogía (Spanish Mineralogical Society), Swiss Society of Mineralogy and Petrology, Meteoritical Society, Japan Association of Mineralogical Sciences and the International Association on the Genesis of Ore Deposits. It was established in January 2005.

The editors-in-chief are Richard J. Harrison (2020-2022), Rebecca A. Lange (2021-2023), and Janne Blichert-Toft (2022-2024). The journal covers all aspects of mineralogy, geochemistry, and petrology. Each issue is devoted to a particular topic and contains invited review articles, as well as society news and book reviews.

== Abstracting and indexing ==
The journal is abstracted and indexed in Chemical Abstracts Service, Current Contents/Physical, Chemical & Earth Sciences, Ei Compendex, GEOBASE, Science Citation Index Expanded, and Scopus. According to the Journal Citation Reports, the journal has a 2020 impact factor of 3.632.
