= Andrea Grottoli =

Canadian biologist

Andréa Geneviève Grottoli
- Education: McGill University; University of Houston; University of California, Irvine
- Scientific career
- Workplaces: Ohio State University
- Thesis: Interpretation of stable carbon isotopes in reef coral skeletons and applications for paleoclimate reconstruction (1998)

Andréa Geneviève Grottoli is a Canadian and American marine scientist who is an Arts and Sciences Distinguished Professor of Earth Sciences at the Ohio State University. She is a Fellow of the American Association for the Advancement of Science, a fellow of the International Coral Reef Society, and was named the 2021 American Geophysical Union Rachel Carson Lecturer. She is the past-President of the International Coral Reef Society.

== Early life and education ==
Grottoli was an undergraduate at McGill University and graduated in 1992. She was a graduate student at the University of Houston, graduating in 1998, where she studied reef coral skeletons with Gerard Wellington. During her graduate studies, she went on a field trip to Hawaii with Paul Jokiel, and became inspired to learn more about coral reefs. She moved to the University of California, Irvine, where she finished postdoctoral studies and worked as a postdoctoral fellow with Ellen Druffel.

== Research and career ==
In 2001, Grottoli started her academic career at the University of Pennsylvania, where she was supported by a Institute for Citizens & Scholars Fellowship. She was appointed assistant professor at Ohio State University in 2005. She established the Stable Isotope Biogeochemistry Laboratory. Her research combines geochemistry and coral biology. She is particularly interested in what allows corals to become resistant to climate change. She was a speaker at a 2015 TEDx Ohio State University event, where she spoke about the connection between humans and corals.

In 2019, Grottoli launched the Coral Bleaching Research Coordination Network (CBRCN). In 2020, she was awarded a Fulbright Program Fellowship. She spent the year in the Sorbonne University Oceanographic Lab in Villefranche-sur-Mer where she studied corals of the Mediterranean, and how they are able to survive in stressful environments.

In a 2023 interview, Grottoli shared that she holds a patent for a device which works underwater to support the feeding of corals by attracting zooplankton toward a light near the coral. Her research has expanded into understanding corals' non-photosynthetic nutrition as a source of climate resilience. She holds a pending patent for UZELA, the Underwater Zooplankton Enhancement Light Array. Details about her research and publications can also be found on her research website.

== Awards and honours ==
- 2004 Geochemical Society F.W. Clarke Award
- 2016 International Coral Reef Society Studies Mid-Career Award
- 2016 Elected Fellow of the International Coral Reef Society
- 2017 Elected Fellow of the American Association for the Advancement of Science
- 2018 American Geophysical Union Voyager Award
- 2018 Elected President of the International Coral Reef Society
- 2020 Fulbright Fellow (Franco-American Commission for Educational Exchange).
- 2021 American Geophysical Union Rachel Carson Lecture
- 2021 Ohio State University Arts and Sciences Distinguished Professor of Earth Sciences
- 2024 Marquis Who's Who Award
- 2026 John H. Martin Award from the Association for the Sciences of Limnology and Oceanography, as lead author of the awarding-winning paper

== Selected publications ==
- Andréa G Grottoli; Lisa J Rodrigues; James E Palardy (2006). "Heterotrophic plasticity and resilience in bleached corals". Nature. 440 (7088): 1186–1189. doi:10.1038/nature04565. PMID 16641995. Wikidata Q30813751.
- Kenneth R. N. Anthony; Mia O. Hoogenboom; Jeffrey A. Maynard; Andréa G. Grottoli; Rachael Middlebrook (2009). "Energetics approach to predicting mortality risk from environmental stress: a case study of coral bleaching". Functional Ecology. 23 (3): 539–550. doi:10.1111/j.1365-2435.2008.01531.x. Wikidata Q58383754.
- Grottoli AG, Warner ME, Levas SJ, Aschaffenburg M, Schoepf V, McGinley M, Baumann J, Matsui Y. (2014) "The cumulative impact of annual coral bleaching turns some coral species winners into losers." Global Change Biology 20(12):3823-3833, https://doi.org/10.1111/gcb.12658
- Grottoli AG, Dixon S, Hulver AM, Bardin C, Lewis CJ, Suchocki CR, Consortium R3D, Toonen RJ. (2025) Underwater Zooplankton Enhancement Light Array (UZELA): a technology solution to enhance zooplankton abundance and coral feeding in bleached and non-bleached corals. Limnology and Oceanography Methods 23(3): 201-211 doi: 10.1002/lom3.10669, https://doi.org/10.1002/lom3.10669

== Personal life ==
Grottoli is married and has an 18-year-old daughter. In her free time she enjoys activities like hiking, mountain biking, yoga, and cooking.
