= Charles R. Bacon =

American geologist

Charles R. Bacon is an American geologist and volcanologist at the United States Geological Survey in the Volcano Hazards Team, and who is best known for his work on the volcanic history of Crater Lake National Park and Mount Mazama.

== Biography ==
Bacon grew up in Stanford; the son of Stanford University mathematics professor Harold M. Bacon, and his wife and Stanford alumna Rosamond.

== Career ==
Bacon earned his BS in Geology at Stanford in 1970 and his Ph.D. in Geology from University of California, Berkeley in 1975, under the supervision of Ian S.E. Carmichael. After finishing his doctoral thesis, Bacon took up employment with the United States Geological Survey, initially working on the geothermally-active Coso Volcanic Field. His research spanned physical volcanology, petrology, geochemistry, and the eruptive histories of calderas, notably Crater Lake, Oregon, and Veniaminof and Aniakchak calderas, Alaska Peninsula. Bacon's main contributions to volcanology over many years have been his sustained studies of the volcanic history of Crater Lake and Mount Mazama.

== Cynthia Dusel-Bacon ==
He married Cynthia Dusel, a metamorphic petrologist and field geologist with the Alaska Division of the United States Geological Survey. In August 1997, Dusel-Bacon was mauled by a black bear, while working in the field in Alaska. She lost both arms in the accident, but managed to radio for help and was rescued.

== Awards ==
- 1987 - L.R. Wager Medal, Association of Volcanology and Chemistry of the Earth's Interior (IAVCEI)
- 1999 - N.L. Bowen Award, American Geophysical Union
- 2003 - Crater Lake Institute Centennial Award for Excellence in Research at Crater Lake National Park
- 2004 - U.S. Department of the Interior Meritorious Service Award

== Publications ==
- Bacon, C. R. (1981). "Geologic map of the Coso volcanic field and adjacent areas, Inyo County, California". USGS Report: 20. Bibcode:1981usgs.rept...20B. doi:10.3133/i1200.
- Bacon, Charles R.; Duffield, Wendell A. (10 May 1980). "Coso Geothermal Area". Journal of Geophysical Research: Solid Earth. 85 (B5): 2379. Bibcode:1980JGR....85.2379B. doi:10.1029/JB085iB05p02379.
- Novak, Steven W.; Bacon, Charles R. (1986). "Pliocene volcanic rocks of the Coso Range, Inyo County, California". USGS Report: 4. Bibcode:1986usgs.rept....4N. doi:10.3133/pp1383.
