= Rebecca Lange =

Geologist

Becky Lange
- Born: Rebecca Ann Lange
- Education: University of California, Berkeley (BS, PhD)
- Awards: F.W. Clarke Medal (1995); Sigma Xi
- Scientific career
- Fields: Geochemistry; Magmatism; Volcanism; Experimental petrology Thermodynamics
- Workplaces: Princeton University; University of Michigan
- Thesis: I. Properties of silicate liquids: volume and redox state : II. The association of Lamprophyres and Basaltic Andesites in Western Mexico (1989)
- Doctoral advisor: Ian S. E. Carmichael
- Website: lsa.umich.edu/earth/people/faculty/becky.html

Rebecca Ann Lange is a professor of experimental petrology, magmatism and volcanism at the University of Michigan. Her research investigates how magmatism has shaped the evolution of the Earth, as well as the formation of continental crust. She is a Fellow of the Mineralogical Society of America and was awarded the F.W. Clarke Medal in 1995.

== Early life and education ==
Lange studied geology at the University of California, Berkeley. She earned her bachelor's degree in 1995, and remained there for her doctoral studies. She was a member of Sigma Xi. Lange completed her doctorate under the supervision of Ian S. E. Carmichael. Together they worked on the aurora volcanic field, which is located in the Mono Lake in the Great Basin.

== Research and career ==
Lange was a postdoctoral researcher at Princeton University where she worked with Alexandra Navrotsky on the heat capacities of silicate liquids.

Lange was appointed assistant professor at the University of Michigan in 1991 and was promoted to professor in 2004. Her research investigates how magmatism and volcanism have shaped the Earth. Lange studies the formation of the continental crust. She works on the Trans-Mexican Volcanic Belt, a neogene volcanic arc at the edge of the North American Plate. Here she is uncovering the eruption rates of magma, proportions of different types of magma and role of water.

She created a thermodynamic model of the plagioclase-liquid exchange reaction. Lange's model contained calorimeteric and volumetric information for the liquid and crystalline components. Lange has since served on the F.W. Clarke Medal committee.

=== Awards and honours ===
Her awards and honours include:

- 1995 Awarded the F.W. Clarke Medal by the Geochemical Society
- 1997 University of Michigan Class of 1923 Memorial Teaching Award and John Dewey Award
- 2014 Geochemical Fellow
- 2016 Served as president of the Mineralogical Society of America
