= Thermo =

Thermo may refer to:

- Adobe Thermo, a designers' tool for creating the user interface for Rich Internet Application by Adobe Systems
- Heat, energy transferred from one system to another by thermal interaction
- Thermo Fisher Scientific, a healthcare equipment company
- Thermo, Greece, a town in Aetolia-Acarnania, Greece
- Thermodynamics, the branch of physical science concerned with heat and its relation to other forms of energy and work
- Thermos, an insulating storage vessel which keeps its contents hotter or cooler than its surroundings
- Thermo (journal), an academic journal published by MDPI
