= Geostandards and Geoanalytical Research =

- Discipline: Analytical chemistry
- Language: English
- Edited by: Thomas C. Meisel, Jacinta Enzweiler, Mary F. Horan, Kathryn L. Linge, Christophe R. Quétel, Paul J. Sylvester

Publication details
- Former name(s): Geostandards Newsletter: The Journal of Geostandards and Geoanalysis
- History: 1977-present
- Publisher: Wiley-Blackwell on behalf of the International Association of Geoanalysts
- Frequency: Quarterly
- Impact factor: 4.256 (2018)

Standard abbreviations
- ISO 4: Geostand. Geoanalytical Res.

Indexing
- CODEN: GGREA3
- ISSN: 1639-4488 (print); 1751-908X (web)
- LCCN: 2004251126
- OCLC no.: 609937634
- Geostandards Newsletter
- ISSN: 0150-5505

Links
- Journal homepage; Online access; Online archive

Geostandards and Geoanalytical Research is a quarterly peer-reviewed scientific journal covering reference materials, analytical techniques, and data quality relevant to the chemical analysis of geological and environmental samples. The journal was established in 1977 as Geostandards Newsletter and modified its title in 2004. The editors-in-chief are Thomas C. Meisel, Jacinta Enzweiler, Mary F. Horan, Kathryn L. Linge, Christophe R. Quétel and Paul J. Sylvester. It is published by Wiley-Blackwell on behalf of the International Association of Geoanalysts. The journal is a hybrid open-access journal, publishing both subscription and open access articles.

== Article types ==
The journal publishes original research papers that include developments in analytical techniques, studies of geological-environmental reference materials, advances in statistical analysis of geoanalytical data, as well as data compilations, contributions to the characterisation of reference materials, as well as review articles and topical commentaries. It also publishes an annual bibliographic review article of the geoanalytical literature and a biennial series of critical reviews of analytical developments.

== Abstracting and indexing ==
The journal is abstracted and indexed in:

- Academic Search
- Aquatic Sciences & Fisheries Abstracts
- Chemical Abstracts Service
- Current Contents/Physical, Chemical & Earth Sciences
- GeoRef
- Science Citation Index

According to the Journal Citation Reports, the journal has a 2018 impact factor of 4.256, ranking it 11th out of 84 journals in the category "Geochemistry and Geophysics".

== See also ==
- List of chemistry journals
- List of scientific journals
