= International Association of Geoanalysts =

- Abbreviation: IAG
- Formation: 1997
- Type: Learned society
- Region served: Worldwide
- Official language: English
- Website: IAG Official website

The International Association of Geoanalysts (IAG) is an international not-for-profit learned society dedicated to the advancement and promotion of geoanalytical science, the analysis of geological and environmental materials.

== Activities ==
The association aims to improve and promote the assessment of measurement uncertainty and data quality as fit for purpose through proficiency testing and the development and use of geochemical reference materials. The IAG organises meetings, conferences, workshops and short courses, is associated with journal publishing, and operates two proficiency testing schemes: GeoPT, initiated in 1996, intended for analytical chemistry laboratories dealing with whole-rock geochemical analyses and G-Probe for microprobe and laser ablation ICP-MS geochemical laboratories. The IAG also carries out the certification of geological and environmental reference materials in accordance with its own Certification Protocol, and holds liaison membership of ISO-REMCO to represent the views of the geochemical research community particularly in matters of metrology.

The IAG has a legal-commercial arm, IAGeo Limited, which distributes, markets and develops reference materials for scientific research.

== History ==
The International Association of Geoanalysts was founded on 2 June 1997 during the 'Geoanalysis 97' Conference held at Vail, Colorado, USA. It is a successor organisation to the International Working Group-Groupe International de Travail (IWG-GIT) on geochemical reference materials, which operated under the direction of Dr K. Govindaraju at the CRPG, Nancy (France) from 1977 to its dissolution in 1996, and which was closely associated with the journal Geostandards Newsletter.

== Governance ==
The IAG is directed by a fifteen-member council, the current president of which is Professor Jacinta Enzweiler (University of Campinas, Brazil). The past presidents of the association are: Douglas L. Miles (formerly of the British Geological Survey), Philip J. Potts (The Open University, UK), Michael Wiedenbeck (Helmholtz-Zentrum Potsdam, Germany) and Thomas C. Meisel (Montanuniversität Leoben, Austria).

== Publications ==
The IAG is an editorial partner of the quarterly journal Geostandards and Geoanalytical Research published by Wiley-Blackwell. The association is also a joint publishing partner of Elements - an International Magazine of Mineralogy, Geochemistry and Petrology.

== Specialist sub committees ==
The association has a number of special interest groups dealing with its core activities. These are:

- Certification and Reference Material Committee
- Steering Committee for the GeoPT proficiency testing programme
- Steering Committee for the G-Probe proficiency testing programme
- Geochronology Interest Group

== Conferences and workshops ==
The IAG is the main sponsor of the triennial Geoanalysis conference – an international meeting series that has taken place since 1990. Scientific proceedings of the Geoanalysis conferences are published in Geostandards and Geoanalytical Research. The IAG also organises short courses on Quality Assurance in geoanalysis as well as workshops dealing with isotope determination in geochemistry.

== Awards ==
The IAG dispenses an annual Early Career Researcher Award for excellence in analytical geochemistry. Eligibility is limited to scientists who are currently pursuing a higher degree in a field related to geoanalysis or who have completed their university education within the past five years. The award promotes the careers of young scientists who have either developed innovative analytical methods or provided new strategies to improve data quality as applied to the chemical analysis of geological or environmental samples.
