= Geochemistry, Geophysics, Geosystems =

- Discipline: Geosciences
- Language: English
- Edited by: Claudio Faccenna

Publication details
- History: 2000–present
- Publisher: Wiley on behalf of the American Geophysical Union
- Frequency: Monthly
- Open access: Yes
- License: CC BY
- Impact factor: 4.480 (2021)

Standard abbreviations
- ISO 4: Geochem. Geophys. Geosyst.

Indexing
- CODEN: GGGGFR
- ISSN: 1525-2027
- LCCN: sn99003972
- OCLC no.: 41417292

Links
- Journal homepage; Online access; Online archive

Geochemistry, Geophysics, Geosystems is a peer-reviewed open-access scientific journal covering research in Earth and planetary processes with a focus on understanding the Earth as a system. The journal is published by Wiley on behalf of the American Geophysical Union. As of May 2022 the editor-in-chief is Claudio Faccenna (Roma Tre University and University of Texas at Austin).

== Abstracting and indexing ==
The journal is abstracted and indexed in:

- Aquatic Sciences and Fisheries Abstracts
- CAB Abstracts
- Current Contents/Physical, Chemical & Earth Sciences
- EBSCO databases
- Ei Compendex
- GEOBASE
- Inspec
- ProQuest databases
- Science Citation Index Expanded
- Scopus

According to the Journal Citation Reports, the journal has a 2021 impact factor of 4.480.
