= Igneous petrology =

Study of igneous rocks

Igneous petrology is the study of igneous rocks—those that are formed from magma. As a branch of geology, igneous petrology is closely related to volcanology, tectonophysics, and petrology in general. The modern study of igneous rocks uses a number of techniques, some of them developed in the fields of chemistry, physics, or other earth sciences. Petrography, crystallography, and isotopic studies are common methods used in igneous petrology.

== Methods ==
=== Determination of chemical composition ===
The composition of igneous rocks and minerals can be determined via a variety of methods of varying ease, cost, and complexity. The simplest method is observation of hand samples with the naked eye and/or with a hand lens. This can be used to gauge the general mineralogical composition of the rock, which gives an insight into the composition. A more precise but still relatively inexpensive way to identify minerals (and thereby the bulk chemical composition of the rock) with a petrographic microscope. These microscopes have polarizing plates, filters, and a conoscopic lens that allow the user to measure a variety of crystallographic properties. Another method for determining mineralogy is to use X-ray diffraction, in which a powdered sample is bombarded by X-rays, and the resultant spectrum of crystallographic orientations is compared to a set of standards. One of the most precise ways of determining chemical composition is by the use of an electron microprobe, in which tiny spots of materials are sampled. Electron microprobe analyses can detect both bulk composition and trace element composition.

=== Dating methods ===
The dating of igneous rocks determines when magma solidified into rock. Radiogenic isotopes are frequently used to determine the age of igneous rocks.

==== Potassium–argon dating ====
In this dating method the amount of ^{40}Ar trapped in a rock is compared to the amount of ^{40}K in the rock to calculate the amount of time ^{40}K must have been decaying in the solid rock to produce all ^{40}Ar that would have otherwise not have been present there.

==== Rubidium–strontium dating ====
The rubidium–strontium dating is based on the natural decay of ^{87}Rb to ^{87}Sr and the different behaviour of these elements during fractional crystallization of magma. Both Sr and Rb are found in most magmas; however, as fractional crystallization occurs, Sr will tend to be concentrated in plagioclase crystals while Rb will remain in the melt for a longer time. ^{87}Rb decays in magma and elsewhere so that every 1.42×10^{11} years half of the amount has been converted into ^{87}Sr. Knowing the decay constant and the amount of ^{87}Rb and ^{87}Sr in a rock it is possible to calculate the time that the ^{87}Rb must have needed before the rock reached closure temperature to produce all ^{87}Sr, yet considering that there was an initial ^{87}Sr amount not produced by ^{87}Rb in the magmatic body. Initial values of ^{87}Sr, when the magma started fractional crystallization, might be estimated by knowing the amounts of ^{87}Rb and ^{87}Sr of two igneous rocks produced at different times by the same magmatic body.

==== Other methods ====
Stratigraphic principles may be useful to determine the relative age of volcanic rocks. Tephrochronology is the most common application of stratigraphic dating on volcanic rocks.

=== Thermobarometry methods ===
In petrology the mineral clinopyroxene is used for temperature and pressure calculations of the magma that produced igneous rock containing this mineral. Clinopyroxene thermobarometry is one of several geothermobarometers. Two things make this method especially useful: first, clinopyroxene is a common phenocryst in igneous rocks easy to identify; and secondly, the crystallization of the jadeite component of clinopyroxene implies a growth in molar volume being thus a good indicator of pressure.

== Publications ==
Most contemporary ground breaking in igneous petrology has been published in prestigious American and British scientific journals of worldwide circulation such as Science and Nature. Study material, overviews of certain topics and older works are often found as books. Many works before the plate tectonics paradigm shift in the 1960s and 1970s contains inaccurate information regarding the origin of magmas.

Notable journals that publish igneous petrology studies
Name	Publisher	Scope
American Mineralogist	Mineralogical Society of America	Mineralogy, petrology, crystallography, geochemistry
Bulletin of Volcanology	Springer	Volcanology
Contributions to Mineralogy and Petrology	Springer	Mineralogy, petrology
Journal of Petrology	Oxford University Press	Igneous petrology, metamorphic petrology
Journal of Volcanology and Geothermal Research	Elsevier	Volcanology, geothermal research
Lithos	Elsevier	Igneous petrology, petrogenesis, metamorphic petrology

== Notable igneous petrologists ==
- Norman L. Bowen
- Nicolas Desmarest
- Louis Cordier
- Harry von Eckermann
- Antoine François Alfred Lacroix
- Akiho Miyashiro
- Paul Niggli
- Hans Ramberg
- Jakob Sederholm
- Albert Streckeisen
- Marjorie Wilson
- Peter John Wyllie
- Lawrence Wager
