= Jean Morrison (professor) =

American university academic

Jean Morrison (born May 19, 1958) is an American university academic. She is a professor of earth and environment at Boston University, where, from 2011-2023, she was the university’s provost and chief academic officer - the first woman to be appointed to that role. Prior to joining Boston University, she was executive vice provost for academic affairs and graduate programs at the University of Southern California.

== Biography ==
Morrison is a metamorphic petrologist by training, whose research explores the evolution of the Earth’s crust. A native of Pawling, New York, she received her BA from Colgate University, an MS from the University of Georgia, and a PhD from the University of Wisconsin–Madison.

Morrison joined the faculty of USC in 1988 as assistant professor. She served as a member of USC's earth sciences faculty for 22 years before taking the role of provost at Boston University. While at USC, Morrison became the inaugural director of the university's Women in Science and Engineering Program and served as vice provost for academic affairs and graduate programs. She was also director of the university's graduate school for six years. Morrison has served on several National Science Foundation panels, as an editor of the Journal of Metamorphic Geology, and as an associate editor of American Mineralogist and the Geological Society of America Bulletin. In 2000, she was named Sigma Chi Professor of the Year, and she received Sigma Gamma Epsilon’s Excellence in Teaching Award. She also received USC's Associates Award for Excellence in Teaching, the university's highest teaching award.

In January 2011, Morrison joined Boston University as its second highest ranking officer and the first woman provost in its history, succeeding previous provost David Campbell. On May 12, 2023, it was announced that Morrison would be stepping down as provost effective July 1. She was succeeded in the role by Interim Provost Kenneth Lutchen.

== Work as provost ==
As provost, Morrison oversaw several efforts designed to enhance BU’s academic quality and global competitiveness, including the launch of the BU Hub, a university-wide general education program for all undergraduates; a university-wide arts initiative; new divisions in digital learning, diversity, and graduate education; and initiatives to expand BU's footprint in the data sciences and opportunities for women in the STEM fields.

Boston University's progress was acknowledged in many ways under Morrison's tenure, including improved academic rankings. Most notably, in 2012, Boston University was admitted to the Association of American Universities (AAU), the group of premier public and private research universities in the United States and Canada. The university also launched two new colleges during this time: the Arvind and Chandan Nandlal Kilachand Honors College, a residential honors college for Boston University undergraduates, which was dedicated in 2011; and the Frederick S. Pardee School of Global Studies, established in 2014, which combines traditional international relations with faculty in the humanities and social sciences interested in global students, as well as the traditional area studies centers.

== Research and teaching ==
Morrison’s research in stable isotope geochemistry focuses on understanding the evolution and properties of the Earth's deep crust, with particular emphasis on the physiochemical characteristics in earthquake fault systems and the origins of rocks and minerals. She has received numerous National Science Foundation grants supporting her research and published dozens of articles in leading scientific journals, including Science, Geology, and International Geology Review. Her teaching at the collegiate level has explored geology, mineralogy, petrology, and the process of change in science.

== Graduate Student Unionization ==
On September 23, 2022, Morrison sent a message to Boston University graduate students on behalf of the Office of the Provost recommending against the formation of a graduate student union. In the email, she described the unionization effort as a "one-size-fits-all" model that is "fundamentally incompatible" with Boston University. In early November, graduate students rejected an offer from the university which would have voluntarily recognized a unit of doctoral candidates, but not other graduate students.

== Personal ==
Morrison lives in Brookline, Massachusetts, with her husband, Lawford Anderson, who works at Boston University as a professor of earth and environment. They have two grown children.

== Awards and affiliations ==
- Fellow, Geological Society of America
- Fellow, Mineralogical Society of America
- Member, American Geophysical Union
- Honorary Degree, Colgate University (2022)
- Distinguished Alumni Award, University of Wisconsin-Madison, Department of Geoscience (2012)
- Remarkable Woman Award, University of Southern California (2008)
- USC Associates Award for Excellence in Teaching (2002)
- Sigma Chi Professor of the Year (2000)
- Sigma Gamma Epsilon, Excellence in Teaching Award (2000)
