= Geothermal =

Geothermal is related to energy and may refer to:

- Geothermal energy, useful energy generated and stored in the Earth
- Geothermal activity, the range of natural phenomena at or near the surface, associated with release of the Earth's internal heat.
- Earth's internal heat budget, accounting of the flows of energy at and below the surface of the planet's crust
- Geothermal gradient, down which heat flows within the Earth
- Geothermal exploration, the search for commercially usable geothermal energy

== Uses of geothermal energy ==
- Earth sheltering, constructing a building into a hill side or Earth berm to reduce heating and cooling requirements
- Earth cooling tubes, using ambient Earth temperature to cool and dehumidify air
- Geothermal desalination, the production of fresh water using heat energy extracted from underground rocks
- Geothermal heating, methods of heating and cooling a building using underground heat
- Geothermal power, electricity generated from naturally occurring geological heat sources
- Ground source heat pump, a device used for heating and cooling using the earth as a heat reservoir
  - Direct exchange geothermal heat pump, a method of heating and cooling with the energy of the earth using direct exchange of heat
- Hot dry rock geothermal energy, heating water in hot deep rock
