= Beinn Trilleachan =

840m high mountain in Scotland

Beinn Trilleachean
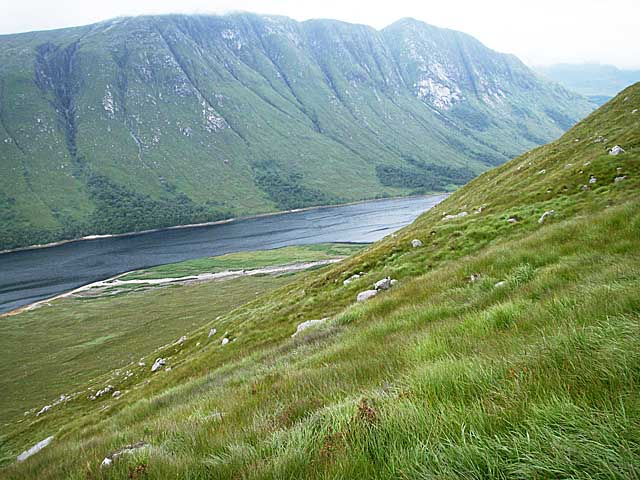
- Beinn Trilleachean rising above Loch Etive

Highest point
- Elevation: 840 m (2,760 ft)
- Prominence: 478 m (1,568 ft)
- Listing: Corbett, Marilyn
- Coordinates: 56°32′53″N 5°06′54″W

Geography
- Location: Highland and Argyll and Bute, Scotland
- Parent range: Grampian Mountains
- OS grid: NN086438
- Topo map: OS Landranger 50

Beinn Trilleachean (840 m) is a mountain in the Grampian Mountains, north of the village of Taynuilt at the head of Loch Etive. It lies on the border of Highland and Argyll and Bute in Scotland.

A very rocky peak, it is best known for the rock climbing opportunities on the slabs above Loch Etive, which are known as the 'Etive Slabs'.
