= Contributions to Mineralogy and Petrology =

- Discipline: Earth sciences
- Language: English
- Edited by: D.Canil, O. Müntener

Publication details
- History: 1947-present
- Publisher: Springer
- Frequency: Monthly
- Open access: hybrid
- Impact factor: 3.23 (2018)

Standard abbreviations
- ISO 4: Contrib. Mineral. Petrol.

Indexing
- CODEN: CMPEAP
- ISSN: 0010-7999 (print); 1432-0967 (web)
- LCCN: sf98085520
- OCLC no.: 39974874

Links
- Journal homepage

Contributions to Mineralogy and Petrology is a peer-reviewed scientific journal published by Springer Science+Business Media since 1947. The journal is a hybrid open-access journal. The journal covers the fields of igneous and metamorphic petrology, geochemistry, and mineralogy.

== Abstracting and indexing ==
This journal is indexed in the following databases:

- Science Citation Index Expanded
- Current Contents - Physical, Chemical & Earth Sciences
- Chemical Abstracts
- VINITI

In 2018, the journal had an impact factor of 3.23.
