= Geochemical Society =

Geophysical Society
- Abbreviation: GS
- Formation: 1951; 75 years ago
- Type: Scientific society
- Tax ID no.: 52-0783490
- Legal status: 501(c)(3) nonprofit
- Purpose: Promotes geochemistry and cosmochemistry
- Headquarters: Washington, D.C., United States
- Members: 4,500 members in 74 countries as of 1 September 2017
- President: Sumit Chakraborty
- Affiliations: American Association for the Advancement of Science, American Geophysical Union, American Geosciences Institute, Council of Engineering and Scientific Society Executives, European Association of Geochemistry, Geochemical Society of Japan, Geological Society of America, International Union of Geological Sciences, Mineralogical Society of America
- Revenue: $344,223 (2017)
- Expenses: 441,093 (2017)
- Website: www.geochemsoc.org

The Geochemical Society is a nonprofit scientific organization founded to encourage the application of chemistry to solve problems involving geology and cosmology. The society promotes understanding of geochemistry through the annual Goldschmidt Conference, publication of a peer-reviewed journal and electronic newsletter, awards programs recognizing significant accomplishments in the field, and student development programs. The society's offices are located on the campus of the Carnegie Institution for Science in Washington, DC.

== Organization and meetings ==
The Geochemical Society was founded in 1955 at a meeting of the Geological Society of America. Its first president was Earl Ingerson and dues started at two dollars per year. In 1990 it was incorporated as a 501(c)(3) nonprofit organization in 1990.

In 1988, the Geochemical society created the Goldschmidt Conferences in honor of the geochemist Victor Goldschmidt (1888–1947), "considered to be the founder of modern geochemistry and crystal chemistry". It was soon joined by the European Association of Geochemistry, and at the 2014 meeting the two organizations signed a Memorandum of Understanding for the governance and trademark protection of the meeting. The conference is one of the world's largest devoted to geochemistry. The society's board of directors holds its annual meeting during the conference.

== Membership ==
The Geochemical Society has nearly 4,000 members from more than 70 countries. Most members are students, researchers and faculty of geochemistry related fields, although anyone with an interest in geochemistry may join. Membership is calendar year and dues are US$35 for a Professional, US$15 for Student, and $20 for Seniors. Membership includes a subscription to Elements Magazine and also offers discounts on Geochemical Society publications, Mineralogical Society of America publications and conference registration discounts at the Goldschmidt Conference, Fall AGU, and the annual GSA conference.

== Publications ==
The Geochemical Society publishes, co-publishes, or sponsors the following:

- Geochimica et Cosmochimica Acta (GCA) – peer-reviewed journal with 24 issues per year, co-sponsored with the Meteoritical Society.
- Elements: An International Magazine of Mineralogy, Geochemistry, and Petrology – 6 issues per year
- Geochemical News – electronic newsletter published weekly
- Special Publications Series – published at various times
- Reviews in Mineralogy and Geochemistry (RiMG) – peer-reviewed multi-author volumes on topics approved by the governing councils of the Geochemical Society and the Mineralogical Society of America.
- Geochemistry, Geophysics, Geosystems (G-cubed) – online journal with peer-reviewed original research papers. 12 issues per year published in collaboration with the American Geophysical Union.

== Awards ==
The Geochemical Society presents the following annual awards:

- V. M. Goldschmidt Award – the society's highest honor, it is awarded for major achievements in geochemistry or cosmochemistry.
- F.W. Clarke Medal – named after Frank Wigglesworth Clarke (1847–1931), a chemist who determined the composition of the Earth's crust, it goes to an early-career scientist for an outstanding contribution to geochemistry or cosmochemistry.
- C.C. Patterson Medal – named after Clair Cameron Patterson (1922–1995), who developed uranium–lead dating, it recognizes an innovative breakthrough in environmental geochemistry, particularly one of value to society.
- Alfred Treibs Medal – Named after Alfred E. Treibs (1899–1983), whose papers on porphyrins were the beginning of the field of organic chemistry, it is awarded by the Organic Geochemistry Division (OGD) for major achievements in organic geochemistry. The OGD also presents an annual Best Paper Award for a publication in the previous year.
- Geochemical Fellows – Starting in 1996, the Geochemical Society and the European Association of Geochemistry (EAG) bestow this honor on outstanding scientists who have made a major contribution to the field of geochemistry. Holders of the Goldschmidt and Treibs medals, as well as the Urey Medal of the EAG, are automatically inducted.

The Distinguished Service Award, which recognizes outstanding service to the Society or the geochemical community, is not awarded every year.

The Geochemical Society sponsors a special lecture at the annual meeting of the Geological Society of America. Called the F. Earl Ingerson Lecture Series, it honors the first president of the Geochemical Society. At the Goldschmidt Conference, the Paul W. Gast Lecture is awarded to a mid-career scientist (under 45 years old) in honor of the first Goldschmidt medalist.
