= CSLP =

CSLP can stand for:

- Center for Short-Lived Phenomena
- Canada Student Loans
- Craik Sustainable Living Project
- Collaborative Summer Library Program
