= Bob Citron =

American businessman (1932–2012)

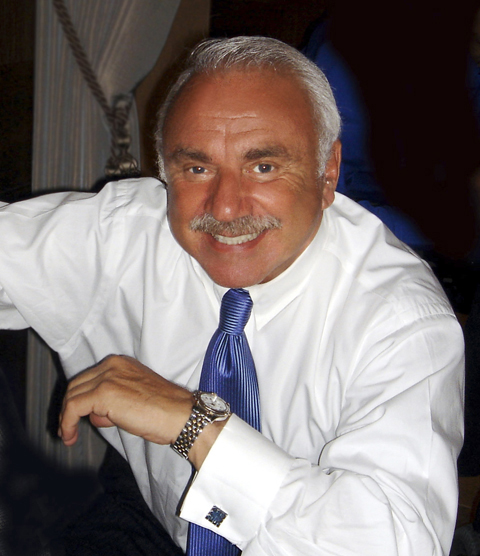
Bob Citron in 2006

Robert A. Citron (September 14, 1932 – January 31, 2012) was an American entrepreneur and aerospace engineer who was born in Brooklyn, New York City, and educated at the University of the Philippines (liberal arts) and aeronautical engineering from Northrop University (1953–1959). Citron helped establish and manage the Smithsonian Astrophysical Observatory's Operation Moonwatch and Precision Optical Satellite Tracking Programs (STP) after the launch of Sputnik I in 1957. He founded or co-founded five companies dealing with documentary film production (Limpopo Films Pty. Ltd. – 1964), publishing (Adventure Travel, Inc. – 1976), space research and space logistics support (SPACEHAB, Inc. – 1983), reusable satellite launch systems (Kistler Aerospace Corporation – 1993), and Lunar transportation and logistics (Lunar Transportation Systems, Inc. – 2004). Citron also started three nonprofit foundations dealing with scientific field research (Educational Expeditions International with Clarence Truesdale, superintendent of Vermont public schools, in 1971, which became Earthwatch, short-lived phenomena (Center for Short-Lived Phenomena – 1975), and the study of the long-term future of humanity Foundation For the Future – 1996). He died on January 31, 2012, at his home in Bellevue, Washington, at the age of 79, due to complications from prostate cancer.

== Early career ==
Citron worked for the Smithsonian Institution for 17 years, establishing satellite tracking stations around the world, and creating and managing scientific field research projects. While at the Smithsonian he built and managed astrophysical research observatories in the US, Spain, Norway, Ethiopia, South Africa, and India (1959–1968) and founded the Smithsonian Institution Center for Short-lived Phenomena (CSLP) in 1968. The purpose of the Smithsonian Satellite Tracking Program was to track satellites to determine their precision orbits in order to better understand the Earth's atmosphere and to better define the geodesy of planet Earth. Citron created and managed the Smithsonian Transient Lunar Phenomena (TLP) program for NASA during the Apollo Program (1968–1972) and established the NASA/Smithsonian Skylab Earth Observing Program (1973–1974) during the post-Apollo period. He established a global Student Environmental monitoring network (1974), involving high school students from 20 countries, to report on significant environmental events (1974).

While at the Smithsonian, Citron was a consultant to a number of United Nations organizations including UNESCO and the United Nations Environment Programme (UNEP). As a consultant to these organizations he was involved in helping to define the goals and operations of UNESCO's "Man and the Biosphere" Programme (1973) and he helped develop requirements for UNEP's "Global Environmental Monitoring System" (1974). Citron also participated in a number of other United Nations programs involved with global environmental monitoring and assessing the human effect on planet Earth (1972–1975).

== Companies ==
Citron founded or co-founded five companies: Limpopo Films, Pty. Ltd. (1964); Adventure Travel, Inc. (1976); SPACEHAB, Inc. (1984); Kistler Aerospace Corporation (1993); and Lunar Transportation Systems, Inc. (2004).

=== Limpopo Films Pty. Ltd. ===
In 1964, while living in Africa, Citron founded Limpopo Films, Pty. Ltd. to produce documentary films for television. Limpopo Films produced a wide variety of films from 1964 to 1968 including Man in Ethiopia (which won numerous national and international awards), Vigeland on Life, Ten Thousand Mile Safari, From Zululand to Zambia, The Lions of Gorongoza, The Crocodiles of the Nile, The Elephants of Wankie, Meteorite Hunt, The Mystery of Zimbabwe, and many others.

=== Adventure Travel, Inc. ===
In 1976 Citron founded the American Adventurer's Association (AAA), which was an international organization for adventurers. The American Adventurer's Association eventually grew to a membership of over 10,000 and published a monthly national magazine, Adventure Travel; a monthly newsletter on worldwide adventure, Adventure Travel Newsletter; and an annual Worldwide Adventure TravelGuide (1978–1981). Adventure Travel magazine eventually reached a national circulation of over 100,000 and was distributed on half a dozen major international airlines. Citron sold his company to the Ziff Davis Publishing Company in 1981.

=== SPACEHAB ===
In 1983 Citron founded SPACEHAB, Inc., which designs, builds, and operates space research laboratories and space logistics modules that fly aboard the Space Shuttle fleet. It began its space commercialization roots through the development of privately owned, pressurized modules that fly in the shuttle's cargo bay and double the amount of working and living space available to the astronaut crew.

Citron incorporated the company in 1984 and the company made its initial public offering in 1995. The company flew its first module on a Space Shuttle mission on June 21, 1993. The SPACEHAB modules that Citron and Tom Taylor invented have been the primary payload on 17 Space Shuttle missions, including research missions on board the fleet of orbiters, and resupply missions to both the Russian space station MIR and the International Space Station (ISS).

=== Kistler Aerospace ===
In 1993 Citron and Walter Kistler founded Kistler Aerospace Corporation to develop fully reusable, low-cost rocketships to take commercial satellites to Low Earth and Geosynchronous Earth Orbit as well as provide logistic support for the International Space Station.

The K-1 was conceived to become the world's first fully reusable aerospace vehicle, designed to deliver payloads to orbit and provide a low-cost alternative to single-use launch vehicles. The company intended the K-1 rocketships to become the reliable, low-cost providers of launch services for commercial and government payloads destined for Low Earth Orbit (LEO), Medium Earth Orbit (MEO), and Geosynchronous Earth Orbit (GEO), as well as for cargo resupply and recovery flights to and from the International Space Station (ISS).

Kistler Aerospace Corporation raised over $600 million in private financing and, in 2006, received a NASA contract for $207 million to further the development of the K-1 launch vehicle fleet.

=== Lunar Transportation Systems, Inc. ===
In 2004, after NASA announced plans to return humans to the Moon and build a lunar base, Citron and Walter Kistler founded Lunar Transportation Systems, Inc. (LTS).

Lunar Transportation Systems, Inc. is developing a new lunar architecture that has a number of advantages over current known and evolving architectures. The LTS architecture uses new innovations for modularity and flexibility, leading to reduced development cost, a faster development schedule, and better evolvability.

LTS architecture will enable NASA to meet its near-term strategic objectives, including sending small payloads to the lunar surface in a few years, sending larger payloads to the lunar surface in succeeding years, and sending crews to the Moon and back to the Earth by the end of the next decade. In addition, the LTS architecture can provide routine logistic support for the lunar base now being planned by NASA.

LTS is a privately financed company that requires cooperation from NASA in order to raise the private capital required to design, build, ground test, flight test, and operate its Earth-Moon transportation system.

== Nonprofit Foundations ==
Citron founded or co-founded three nonprofit foundations: Educational Expeditions International with Clarence Truesdale, superintendent of Vermont public schools, in 1971, which became Earthwatch, the Center for Short-lived Phenomena (spun off from the Smithsonian Institution in 1975), and Foundation For the Future (with Walter Kistler in 1996).

=== Center for Short-Lived Phenomena ===
The Center for Short-Lived Phenomena was a global wire service that included a network of over 3,200 scientists and scientific institutions in 34 countries that reported on and undertook field research on short-lived phenomena such as volcanic eruptions, earthquakes, tidal surges, oil spills, meteorite falls, unusual animal migration, insect infestations, moonquakes, and other short-lived events worthy of scientific investigation. The Center was involved in NASA's Apollo Program (1968–1972), NASA's Transient Lunar Phenomena Program (1969–1972), and NASA's Skylab Earth Observing Program (1973–1974), and established the global Student Environmental Monitoring Network (1973–1975). Citron spun off The Center for Short-lived Phenomena from the Smithsonian Institution in 1975 and established it as a nonprofit organization.

=== Earthwatch ===
Earthwatch Institute is an international nonprofit organization that brings science to life for people concerned about the Earth's future. Founded by Citron and Truesdell in 1969, Earthwatch supports scientific field research by offering volunteers the opportunity to join research teams around the world. This unique model is creating a systematic change in how the public views science and its role in environmental sustainability.

Today, Earthwatch recruits close to 4,000 volunteers per year to collect field data in the areas of rainforest ecology, wildlife conservation, marine science, archaeology, and more. It raises approximately $15 million per year from institutions, individuals, governments, and corporations. Earthwatch is currently supported by more than 150 staff at its headquarters in Maynard, Massachusetts, USA and in offices in Oxford, England; Melbourne, Australia; and Tokyo, Japan.

=== Foundation For the Future ===
Citron co-founded (with Walter Kistler) the nonprofit Foundation For the Future (FFtF). The foundation awarded the annual Kistler Prize, provided grants, and arranged events to discuss the long-term future of humanity. According to the Southern Poverty Law Center (SPLC) in 2008, "the foundation's main undertaking is holding several seminars a year on such things as climate change, energy security, and other important matters."

== Film and television production ==
1964 – present

Citron began making films in 1964 while living in Africa and founded a film production company, Limpopo Films Ltd., which produced a series of documentary and travel films for television. These films included Zululand to Zambia, Ten Thousand Mile Safari, Europe North, Africa South, An American Boy in Russia, and others.

In the 1960s, while with the Smithsonian Institution, Citron made a series of films in Africa on field research expeditions including The Wama Pygmies of the Congo, The Borana Tribe of Ethiopia, The Meteorites of Southwest Africa, and others.

In the 1970s Citron and National Geographic made a series of television documentaries and educational films based on his EARTHWATCH field research expeditions, including The Search for Fossil Man, The Day the Sun Died, The Violent Earth, Earth, the Restless Planet, and others. During this period Citron was also a consultant to a number of film projects for the National Geographic Society, David Wolper Productions, and MGM Documentary Films.

Recently Citron created a 15-minute film entitled Cosmic Origins: From the Big Bang to Humanity as a showcase for the work of the Foundation For the Future. He also supervises the production of a series of short films for the Foundation, including Where Does Humanity Go from Here?, Visions of the Future, and The Young Scholars Inquiry Program. Citron created a television series called The Next Thousand Years, now in development, for public television distribution.

== Scientific field research expeditions ==
Citron has organized, managed, and/or participated in more than 60 scientific field research expeditions in Europe, Africa, Asia, South America, and the South Pacific in fields that include volcanic eruption research, paleoanthropology, archaeology, anthropology, ecology, ethology, zoology, astronomy, meteoritics, and geophysics. He has participated in eight total solar eclipse expeditions in the Philippines, Mexico, Canada, Turkey, Mauritania, Ethiopia, India, and the Libyan Sahara between 1956 and 2006.

Citron has organized, managed, and/or participated in more than a dozen archaeological excavations in Africa and Europe, including excavating early hominid and iron-age sites in South and East Africa with prominent archeological teams (1964–1974).

While working for the Smithsonian, Citron also organized and managed and was the principal cinematographer on 18 volcanic eruption expeditions in Africa, the South Pacific, North and Central America, Hawaii, the Philippines, and New Guinea (1968–1974). He recently donated 40 hours of volcano expedition films to the Smithsonian Institution archives for research and education.

In 2001 Citron organized a major expedition to the South Pacific to observe the reentry of the Russian MIR Space Station in a remote area of the Pacific Ocean. That expedition included chartering two aircraft from Fiji with 31 observers on board. The observers included the Russian Chief Designer of the MIR Space Station as well as three cosmonauts who lived aboard MIR for lengthy durations.

== Memberships ==
Citron was a member of many professional organizations and special-interest groups, including the American Institute of Aeronautics and Astronautics, British Interplanetary Society, The Planetary Society, African Wildlife Federation, Friends of the Earth, Greenpeace, Sierra Club, Union of Concerned Scientists, Seattle Astronomical Society, The Nature Conservancy, The Wilderness Society, American Film Institute, Seattle Film Society, Space Frontier Foundation, and the National Space Society.

== Awards ==
Citron has received numerous awards for the projects he's created and managed, and the films he's made. He was a two-time recipient of the Smithsonian Institution Outstanding Achievement Award for his management of the Smithsonian Astrophysical Observatory Satellite Tracking Program and for founding and managing the Smithsonian Institution Center for Short-lived Phenomena. He also received the Space Pioneer Award from the National Space Society for his invention of the SPACEHAB modules that fly on the Space Shuttle, and he received the Space Entrepreneur of the Year Award from the Space Frontier Foundation for his contributions to the development of space tourism. In 1967 Emperor Haile Selassie presented Citron with the Haile Selassie Gold Medal for his contributions to the people of Ethiopia.

== Publications ==
Citron has published over 200 articles and has written, and/or edited dozens of books and reports dealing with short-lived phenomena, adventure travel, space exploration, meteorite distribution, global environmental monitoring, and the future of humanity.
