= The Stenographers' Guild =

Non-profit organization

- Founded: 1937
- Founder: N. Subramania Iyer
- Type: Education
- Location: T. Nagar, Chennai, India
- Key people: S.R. Sivasubramaniam
- Website: http://www.stenold.org

The Stenographers' Guild, founded in 1937, is a non-profit organization providing vocational education and training in the areas of Secretarial skills, Information Technology, and Shorthand. It is located in T. Nagar, Chennai, in the Indian state of Tamil Nadu.

== History ==
Pitman Shorthand was introduced in 1837 with the release of the inventor's book, Stenographic Sound Hand. It reached Madras in 1886 when a commercial school run by the Pachaiyappa Charities began teaching the language. The Stenographers' Guild was formed fifty years later under the initiative of N. Subramania Iyer, a reporter at the Corporation of Madras, and S. Sivaramakrishna Iyer and P. Ramanuja Iyer, shorthand writers of the High Court of Madras, who convened a meeting in Panagal Park attended by about 40 shorthand writers from the Courts, Police, Government and newspapers. The Guild was inaugurated by C. Rajagopalachari, at the time Chief Minister of Madras, on September 26, 1937. It was to be two more years before the Guild was to be registered as a society. Its aim was to train shorthand writers.

In 2005, The Guild, in association with The Steno Trust, United States, launched a new system of shorthand called Newrite. It was invented by the American Scientist, Walter P. Kistler.

Its key proponent, Mr. S.V. Ramaswamy, developed the institution by bringing into being a lot of Government-sponsored courses that offer free education on Computers, Shorthand, Accountancy, Personality Development, Spoken English, Bank Coaching, etc., to the poor and needy at free of cost.

Mr. S. V. Ramaswamy was forced to leave his 29 years of service to the society when he died of a massive cardiac arrest at the age of 57 on 13 August 2010.

== Present Committee ==
Mr. S.R. Sivasubramaniam is now the Hon. President of The Stenographers' Guild. He is also the son of Shri. S. V. Ramaswamy. He completed his graduation in Commerce and continues to be in the field of Remote Infrastructure services of Information Technology. He and his Executive Committee team are on the verge of taking the name of the institution to greater heights.
