= Charles Daubeny =

English chemist, botanist and geologist (1795–1867)

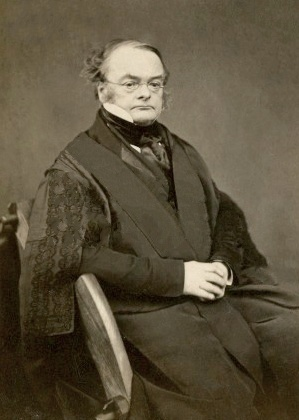
Charles Daubeny in 1856–1860

Charles Giles Bridle Daubeny (11 February 1795 – 12 December 1867) was an English chemist, botanist and geologist.

== Education ==
Daubeny was born at Stratton near Cirencester in Gloucestershire, the son of the Rev. James Daubeny. He went to Winchester College in 1808, and in 1810 was elected to a demyship at Magdalen College, Oxford, under Dr. John Kidd. From 1815 to 1818 he studied medicine in London and Edinburgh, in the latter also studying geology under Prof Robert Jameson. He took his M.D. degree at Oxford, and was a fellow of the College of Physicians.

== Fieldwork ==
In 1819, in the course of a tour through France, he made the volcanic district of Auvergne a special study, and his Letters on the Volcanos of Auvergne were published in The Edinburgh Journal. He was elected a fellow of the Royal Society in 1822.

By subsequent journeys in Hungary, Transylvania, Italy, Sicily, France and Germany he extended his knowledge of volcanic phenomena; and in 1826 the results of his observations were given in a work entitled A Description of Active and Extinct Volcanos. In common with Gay-Lussac and Davy, he held subterraneous thermal disturbances to be probably due to the contact of water with metals of the alkalis and alkaline earths.

== Oxford ==
In November 1822, Daubeny succeeded Kidd as professor of chemistry at Oxford, and retained this post until 1855. In 1834, he was appointed to the chair of botany to which was subsequently attached that of rural economy. At the Oxford botanical garden he conducted numerous experiments upon the effect of changes in soil, light and the composition of the atmosphere upon vegetation. In 1830 he published in the Philosophical Transactions a paper on the iodine and bromine of mineral waters. In 1831 Daubeny represented the universities of England at the first meeting of the British Association, which at his request held their next session at Oxford. In 1836 he communicated to the Association a report on the subject of mineral and thermal waters. The Reverend W. Tuckwell drew this pen portrait of Daubeny in 1900:

He [Daubeny] was genial and chatty in society; in College Hall, or at evening parties, which he much frequented, we met the little, droll, spectacled, old-fashioned figure, in gilt-buttoned blue tail coat, velvet waistcoat, satin scarf, kid gloves too long in the fingers, a foot of bright bandanna handkerchief invariably hanging out behind. Or we encountered him on Sunday afternoons, in doctor's hood and surplice, tripping up the steps which led to the street, shuffling into Chapel, always late, cross old Mundy, the College porter, dispossessing some unfortunate stranger to make way for him in the stalls.

Daubeny was a diligent yet not very successful lecturer. Between 1822 and 1854 a total of 618 people attended his chemistry lectures. A third of these were clergymen, while academics numbered 69 and members of the medical profession, 31. According to Tuckwell: 'His chemistry lectures were a failure; he lacked physical force, sprightliness of manner, oral readiness ...' The students sat passively, writing down what Daubeny read out and only watching the experiments. Worse still, says Tuckwell, his scientific demonstrations 'invariably went wrong'. Vernon Harcourt later recalled how, when one experiment failed to yield the result expected, he turned to his assistant, John Harris, and remarked: 'John, when we tried this experiment before the lecture the results were so-and-so'. Harris assented, and Daubeny then turned to the audience: 'You see, gentleman'. H.M. Vernon recounts another incident:

Another story is told of an occasion when the Professor, holding up a vessel, thrilled his hearers by asserting that it contained a liquefied gas, and that, if he were to drop it, the gas would vaporize, and they would all be immediately suffocated. The next instant the vessel slipped and crashed to the ground, but – nothing happened. 'John, why aren't we all suffocated?' demanded Daubeny, and John had to confess that before the lecture he had substituted distilled water for the dangerous gas.

The numbers attending Daubeny's lectures gradually declined. For the period 1822 to 1830 an average of 28 undergraduates were present for his chemistry lectures, with a peak of 44 in 1828. But thereafter a decline set it: for the years 1830 to 1838 the average was 14, and in 1838 fell to just 10, prompting him to cancel his lectures for the next year – understandably, as he personally paid the costs of the experiments.

In 1837 he visited the United States and acquired there the materials for papers on the thermal springs and the geology of North America, read in 1838 before the Ashmolean Society and the British Association (and published in 1839). In 1856 he became president of the latter body at its meeting at Cheltenham. The herbarium at Oxford is named after him, as is the plant genus Daubenya.

In 1860, Daubeny read a paper entitled Remarks on the Final Causes of the Sexuality of Plants at the Natural History Section of the British Association for the Advancement of Science in Oxford. The paper references the work of Charles Darwin. Daubeny has been described as an earlier supporter of natural selection.

== Works ==
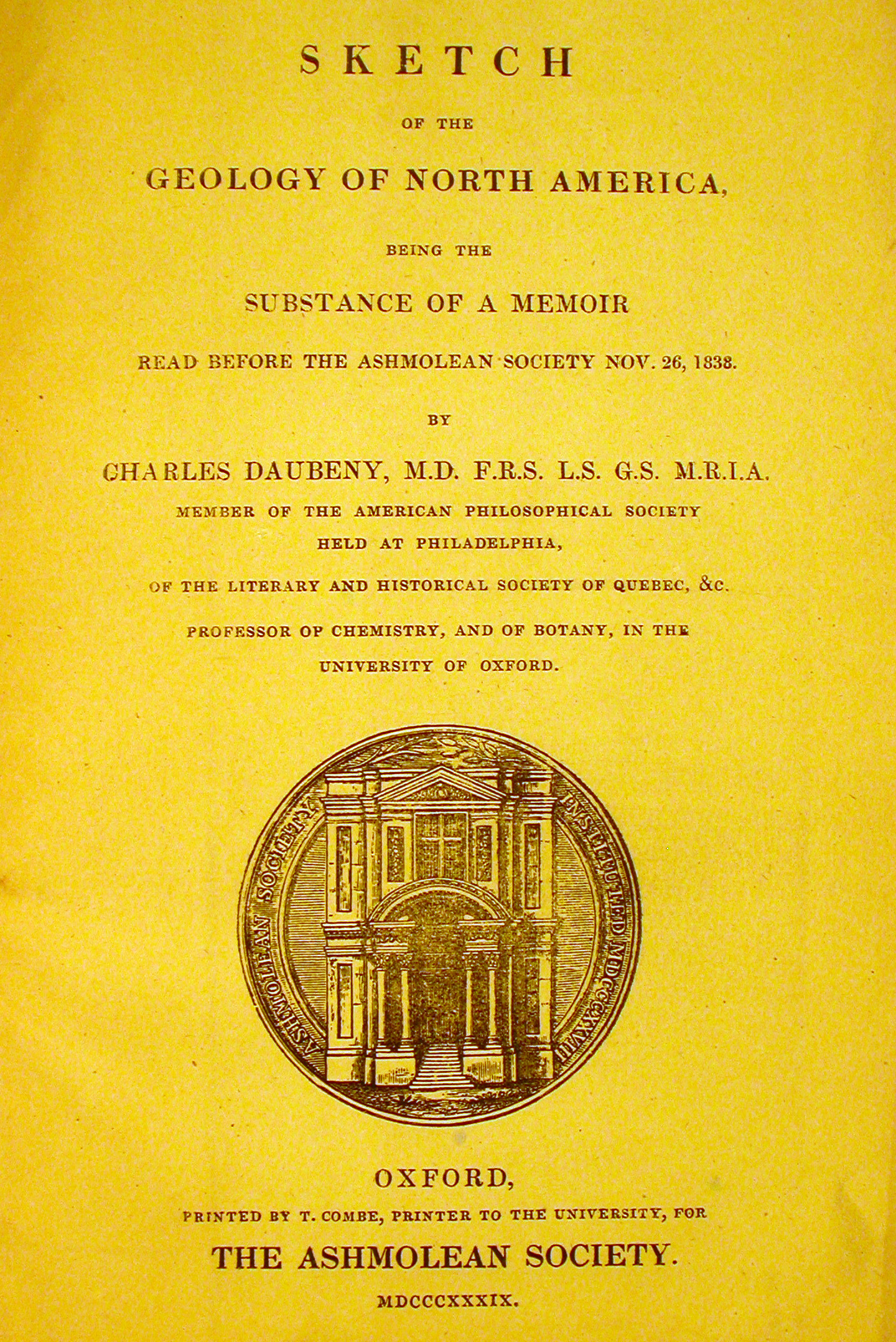
Daubeny's 1839 work on North American geology.

- A Description of active and extinct volcanos (1826)
- Introduction to the Atomic Theory (1831); 2nd edition, 1850
- On the Action of Light upon Plants, and of Plants upon the Atmosphere (1836)
- Sketch of the Geology of North America (1839)
- Lectures on Agriculture (1841)
- Journal of a tour through the United States, and in Canada, made during the years 1837–38 (1843)
- Lectures on Roman Husbandry (1857); in Climate: an inquiry into the causes of its differences and into its influence on Vegetable Life (1863)
- Remarks on the Final Causes of the Sexuality of Plants: With Particular Reference to Mr. Darwin's Work on the Origin of Species (1860)
- Essay on the Trees and Shrubs of the Ancients, and Catalogue of the Trees and Shrubs indigenous to Greece and Italy (1865)
- Miscellanies: being a collection of memoirs and essays on scientific and literary subjects published at various times (1867)

== See also ==
- Volcanoes of the World
