= Ephraim Levin =

Ephraim Y. Levin, (February 22, 1933, Baltimore, Maryland, - November 20, 2020) was an American scientist.

== Academic career ==
1957 BA and MA, 1953, MD, 1957 at Johns Hopkins University. He had an internship and residencies at Johns Hopkins Hospital and Sinai Hospital of Baltimore. He served in the United States Public Health Service USPHS from 1953 to 1998, and was on active duty from 1958 to 1960 and 1974–1998.

Along with Seymour Kaufman he discovered the role of ascorbic acid in the enzymatic hydroxylation of dopamine to form norepinephrine, the first evidence for a specific metabolic function for this vitamin

Fellowship with Konrad Bloch at Harvard University 1961–1963, under the auspices of Sinai Hospital.

He was on the Faculty of Pediatrics at Johns Hopkins School of Medicine 1963–1974.

Along with Vagn Flyger, he demonstrated the partial deficiency of uroporphyrinogen cosynthetase in congenital erythropoietic porphyria of cattle and human beings, its occurrence in asymptomatic carriers of the disease, in fibroblasts as well as in bone marrow, and its probable cause of red bones in fox squirrels.

He once beat Solomon Golumb in a chess game.

== Personal life ==
He married Ruth Lee Shefferman on June 17, 1956, and had four children: Joshua, Rebecca, Daniel, and Michael.
