= Kistler Group =

Swiss manufacturing company

- Type: Private
- Industry: Measurement technology
- Founded: 1959
- Founder: Walter P. Kistler; Hans Conrad Sonderegger
- Headquarters: Winterthur, Switzerland
- Area served: Worldwide
- Key people: Marc Schaad (CEO); Valentin Vogt; VR-Präsident)
- Revenue: 448 Mio. CHF (2024)
- Number of employees: around 2,000 (2024)
- Website: www.kistler.com

Kistler Group (legally registered as Kistler Instrumente AG), headquartered in Winterthur, Switzerland, is an internationally active group of companies specializing measurement technology. The company employs around 2,000 people at more than 60 locations worldwide. In 2024, it generated sales of 448 million Swiss francs. Approximately 9% of revenue flows back into research and technology every year and Kistler holds the rights to around 700 patents.

== History ==
In 1950, Walter P. Kistler patented the charge amplifier he had developed. In 1955, together with Hans Conrad Sonderegger, he founded Kistler Instruments in the USA. At the time, this was a small workshop in North Tonawanda near Buffalo (NY), where electronics and accessories for imported sensors were manufactured. Hans Conrad Sonderegger returned to Switzerland and set up his own business. In 1959, he founded Kistler Instrumente AG, which was dedicated to the development and production of various quartz sensors. In the following years, the Kistler Group expanded abroad, initially by founding subsidiaries in Germany (1963) and the UK (1966). From the mid-1980s, further subsidiaries followed in Europe, North, Central and South America, Asia and Australia.

== Technology ==
Invention of the charge-to-voltage converter

When subjected to a mechanical load, appropriately processed quartz can generate a charge signal that is directly proportional to the acting force: this is the principle of piezoelectricity. In 1948, Walter P. Kistler invented a charge amplifier (charge-to-voltage converter) which was then patented in 1950. His invention opened the way for wide-scale industrial application of this piezoelectricity. The charge amplifier converts the very small electrical charges generated by the quartz crystals into measurable electrical voltage, which can then be analyzed and processed further.

Quartz sensors are extremely stable, robust and compact, and they can often be installed at measuring points where other technologies cannot be used. This is why they are in widespread use not only for research and development but also in production areas and industrial testing technology, among many other applications.

PiezoStar crystals

The Kistler Group has been growing its own crystals for use in piezoelectric sensors since 1998. These new crystalline compounds meet the growing requirements for sensitivity, size (due to the increasing miniaturization of sensors) and stress (due to the higher temperatures at which they are used). Crystals marketed under the PiezoStar name feature high piezoelectric sensitivity, low temperature dependence, high stability of properties, and a possible operating temperature of over 700 °C. Kistler uses the Czochralski method (pullling from the melt), which has been known since 1916, to produce large, high-quality crystals in a short time.

Strain measurement technology and optical measurement methods

As well as specializing in piezoelectric and piezoresistive measurement technology, Kistler also makes use of other technologies such as optical measurement methods and strain measurement technology. Strain gauges are used, in particular, when long-term stable measurements are required in fluctuating temperature environments where very small forces need to be recorded. This is why sensors based on strain gauges are found in test bench measurement technology and force sensors for continuous load measurements. On the other hand, the advantage of optical methods is that they use light for contact-free measurements – so they are suitable for applications such as quality assurance. Automated inspection systems, for example, ensure 100 percent testing and traceability of mass-produced parts.

== Field of activity ==
Kistler develops, manufactures and distributes sensors for measuring pressure, force, torque and acceleration, as well as coordinated electronics and software to analyze and evaluate the recorded measurement data. Kistler products and solutions are used for efficient and sustainable control of production processes across a wide range of sectors, including:

=== Industrial production ===
Cavity pressure and temperature sensors as well as process monitoring systems from Kistler are used in plastics production to understand and control variables that are not directly observable in the injection molding process (such as injection speed or melt temperature) so as to optimize the manufacturing process. Manufacturing of medical devices and pharmaceutical products must meet strict quality criteria. MaXYmos TL ML from Kistler is the world's first FDA- and MDR-compliant process monitoring system for joining and assembly processes as well as test procedures.

In complex semiconductor manufacturing, piezoelectric dynamic measurement technology is used to record, monitor and control mechanical stress, vibrations and pressure deviations, in order to improve quality assurance and productivity.

In the computer, communications and consumer electronics industry (3C) with its very short ramp-up times and maximum quality requirements, highly sensitive sensor technology is combined with process monitoring systems to help detect and separate out faulty parts at an early stage of production.

=== Research and development ===
For vehicle development, Kistler designs test systems and measuring chains for tires, durability, vehicle dynamics and NVH (noise, vibration, harshness) tests. In addition, Kistler equips its own crash test dummies with sensors and develops customized complete crash systems for demanding vehicle safety tests.

Development teams in the aerospace industry use Kistler's sensors for drones and smaller aircraft, measuring vibrations on airplanes or for testing their landing gear and brakes, among other purposes. Kistler's measurement equipment for space testing also covers vibration tests on space payloads in environmental simulations and rocket engine tests. In addition, Kistler develops measurement technology for wind tunnel tests and for engine development and testing.

In shipbuilding and maritime shipping, Kistler applications also ensure greater efficiency and optimized resource consumption on the high seas. To achieve these goals, cylinder pressure in large engines is monitored and the combustion process is optimized – enabling fuel savings of up to two percent per large engine.

=== Safeguarding infrastructure ===
In the energy and infrastructure sector, measurement technology from Kistler enables structural health monitoring (SHM), including research. The sensors and systems can be deployed to monitor busy bridges with the help of Weigh In Motion (WIM) systems; they can also be used to monitor the condition of oil and gas pipelines, nuclear, hydroelectric and wind power plants, gas turbines, and for applications in the construction industry.

=== Performance diagnostics ===
The biomechanics and life sciences industries also make use of measurement technology from Kistler, for example in sports science, performance diagnostics, and movement and gait analysis. Kistler force plates – with their highly sensitive sensor technology – are especially popular in many different countries and sports, and they also played their part in the successes achieved by many Olympic athletes at the 2024 games.

== Acquisitions ==
The following companies belong to the Kistler Group today:

- AMS Gesellschaft für angewandte Mess- und Systemtechnik mbh (since 2018) Now: Kistler Chemnitz GmbH
- LIK Mechanical and Electrical Technology Co., Ltd. (since 2018) Now: Kistler Electromechanical Technology Shanghai Ltd.
- Vester Elektronik GmbH (since 2017) Now: Kistler Straubenhardt GmbH
- eso GmbH (since 2017) Now: Kistler Instrumente GmbH
- Schatz AG (since 2016) Now: Kistler Remscheid GmbH
- Baewert Präzisionsmesstechnik (since 2012) Now: Now: Kistler Instrumente GmbH, Meerane site
- MSC Automotive GmbH (since 2009) Now: Kistler Instrumente GmbH, Sindelfingen site
- KT Automotive GmbH (since 2009) Now: Kistler Instrumente GmbH, Munich site
- Dr. Staiger Mohilo & Co. GmbH (since 2006) Now: Kistler Instrumente GmbH, Sindelfingen site
- VELOS Messsysteme (since 2003) Now: Kistler Instrumente GmbH, Sindelfingen site
- IGeL GmbH (since 2002) Now: Kistler Instrumente GmbH, Sindelfingen site
