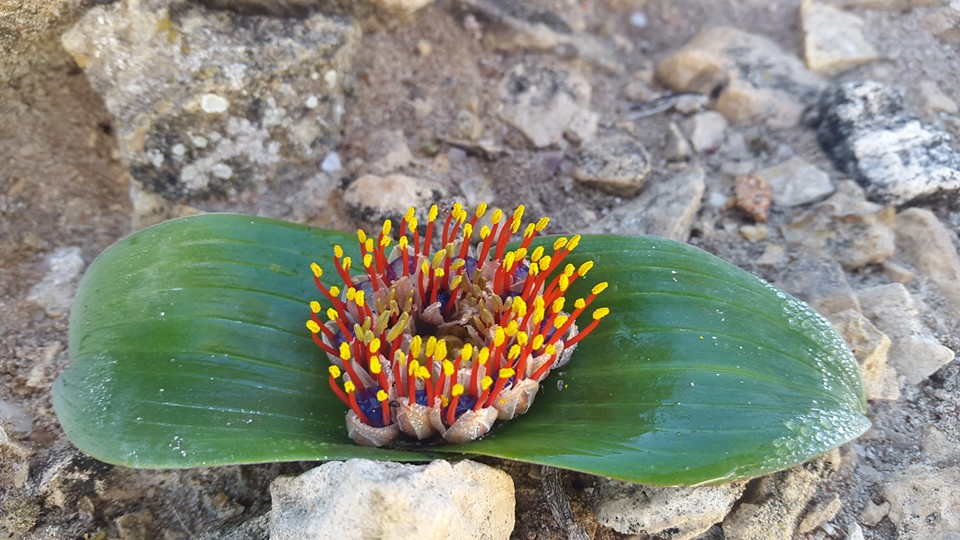

Scientific classification
- Kingdom: Plantae
- Clade: Tracheophytes
- Clade: Angiosperms
- Clade: Monocots
- Order: Asparagales
- Family: Asparagaceae
- Subfamily: Scilloideae
- Genus: Daubenya (Kunth) J.C.Manning & A.M.van der Merwe
- Species: D. zeyheri

Binomial name
- Daubenya zeyheri (Kunth) J.C.Manning & A.M.van der Merwe

Synonyms
- Massonia burchellii Baker; Massonia lanceolata Zeyh. ex Kunth [Illegitimate]; Massonia pedunculata Baker; Massonia zeyheri (Harv. ex Hook.f.) J.F.Macbr.; Neobakeria burchellii (Baker) Schltr.; Polyxena burchellii (Baker) Baker

= Daubenya zeyheri =

Species of flowering plant

Daubenya zeyheri (Kunth) J.C.Manning & A.M.van der Merwe is one of the 8 bulbous species in the genus Daubenya, all endemic to the winter rainfall Strandveld of South Africa, and mostly growing on doleritic clays along the West Coast, Western Cape. It is closely related to Daubenya marginata (Willd. ex Kunth) J.C.Manning & A.M.van der Merwe.

To attract pollinating sunbirds, pools of nectar form in the tubular flowers of Daubenya zeyheri. It is found growing along the coast between boulders and on calcareous sands between Paternoster and Langebaan, within a very small area of some 200 km^{2}. Total population is estimated at no more than 6 500 plants, threatened by plant collectors, and habitat loss due to coastal development and limestone extraction. It has a sturdy pedicel supporting a corymbose inflorescence. When the fruits are mature the peduncle elongates rapidly as a prelude to dispersal of the seeds. The fruit is a papery capsule, inflated and three-angled, dehiscing loculicidally in the upper portion. The capsules fall free at maturity and disperse separately. The seeds are globose and black with a smooth testa, ranging 2–3 mm of diameter.

== Bibliography ==
- 'Systematics of the genus Daubenya' - Manning & van der Merwe (2002)
