= Global Volcanism Program =

American research program

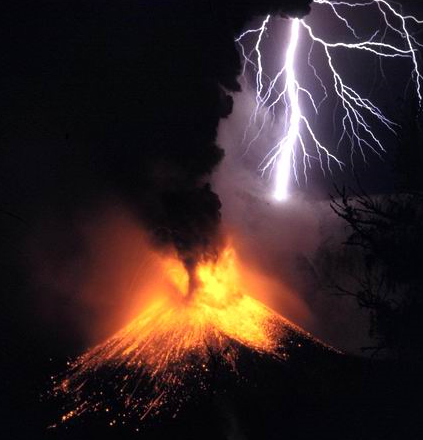
1995 eruption of Mount Rinjani in Indonesia

The Smithsonian Institution's Global Volcanism Program (GVP) documents Earth's volcanoes and their eruptive history during the Quaternary Period of Earth's geologic history, with particular emphasis on volcanic activity during the Holocene Epoch (the last 11,700 years). The mission of the GVP is to document, understand, and disseminate information about global volcanic activity.

== Global Volcanism Program Database ==
The GVP gathers information and reports on current eruptions from around the world, and maintains a database repository on active volcanoes, their eruptions and their eruption histories. In this way, a global context for the planet's active volcanism is presented. Smithsonian reporting on current volcanic activity dates back to 1968, with the Center for Short-Lived Phenomena (CSLP). The GVP is housed in the Department of Mineral Sciences, part of the National Museum of Natural History, on the National Mall in Washington, D.C.

During the early stages of an eruption, the GVP acts as a clearing house of reports, data, and imagery which are accumulated from a global network of contributors. The early flow of information is managed such that the right people are contacted as well as helping to sort out vague and contradictory aspects that typically arise during the early days of an eruption.

The Weekly Volcanic Activity Report is a cooperative project between the Smithsonian's Global Volcanism Program and the United States Geological Survey's Volcano Hazards Program. Notices of volcanic activity posted on the report website are preliminary and subject to change as events are studied in more detail. Detailed reports on various volcanoes are published monthly in the Bulletin of the Global Volcanism Network

The GVP also documents the last 10,000 years of Earth's volcanism. The GVP database includes all known volcanoes that have erupted within the past 10,000 years, and includes listings of eruption dates, and eruptive phenomena; and lists of named volcanoes and volcanic features, with synonyms where they exist. In recent years, the database has been extended to include links to digital imagery, and physical samples that are archived in the Smithsonian Institution Collections. The historic activity can guide perspectives on possible future events and on volcanoes showing activity. GVP's volcano and eruption databases constitute a foundation for all statistical statements concerning locations, frequencies, and magnitudes of Earth's volcanic eruptions during the last 10,000 years.

Three print editions of Volcanoes of the World were published based on the GVP data in 1981, 1994 and 2010. The third and fourth editions were regularly updated at the Program's website. As of August 2024, the fifth edition is available at the GVP website.

== See also ==
- Prediction of volcanic activity
- Timeline of volcanism on Earth
- Volcanic explosivity index
- Volcano Number
