= Volcano Number =

System for uniquely identifying volcanic features on Earth

The Volcano Number (also Volcano Reference File Number, Volcano Numbering System, or VNUM) is a hierarchical geographical system to uniquely identify and tag volcanoes and volcanic features on Earth. As of September 30, 2013, the VNUm consists of 6 numbers, no longer includes non-numeric characters, and no VNUM begins with 0 or 1, to avoid confusion with the legacy numbering system.

The VNUM was developed by the Catalogue of the Active Volcanoes of the World (CAVW) project of the International Association of Volcanology, now the International Association of Volcanology and Chemistry of the Earth's Interior (IAVCEI), in the late 1930s. It is currently administered by the Global Volcanism Program at the Smithsonian Institution in Washington, D.C. (USA), in cooperation with the IAVCEI, and the World Organization of Volcano Observatories (WOVO), a commission of IAVCEI.

The number system was used in both editions of the book Volcanoes of the World in 1981 and 1994.

Prior to September 30, 2013, the system included numbers consisting of four numerals, a hyphen, then two or three more numerals. The first two numerals identified the region, the next two the subregion, and the last two or three the individual volcano.
