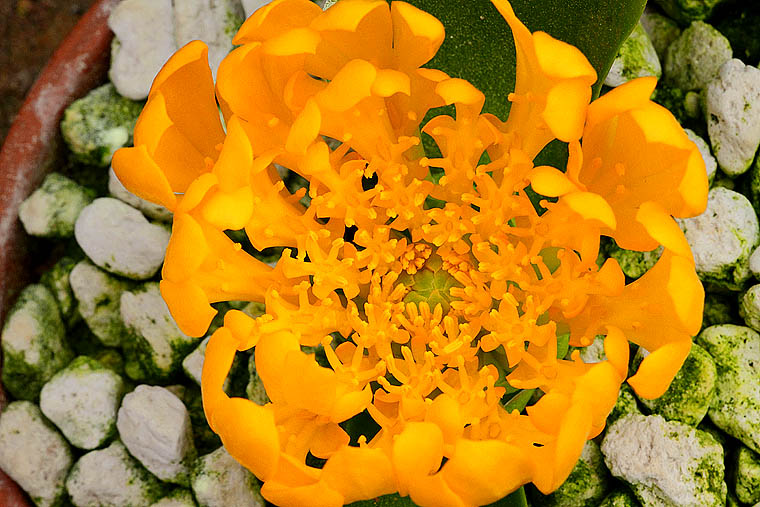

Conservation status
- Endangered (IUCN 2.3)

Scientific classification
- Kingdom: Plantae
- Clade: Tracheophytes
- Clade: Angiosperms
- Clade: Monocots
- Order: Asparagales
- Family: Asparagaceae
- Subfamily: Scilloideae
- Genus: Daubenya
- Species: D. aurea

Binomial name
- Daubenya aurea Lindl.

= Daubenya aurea =

Species of flowering plant

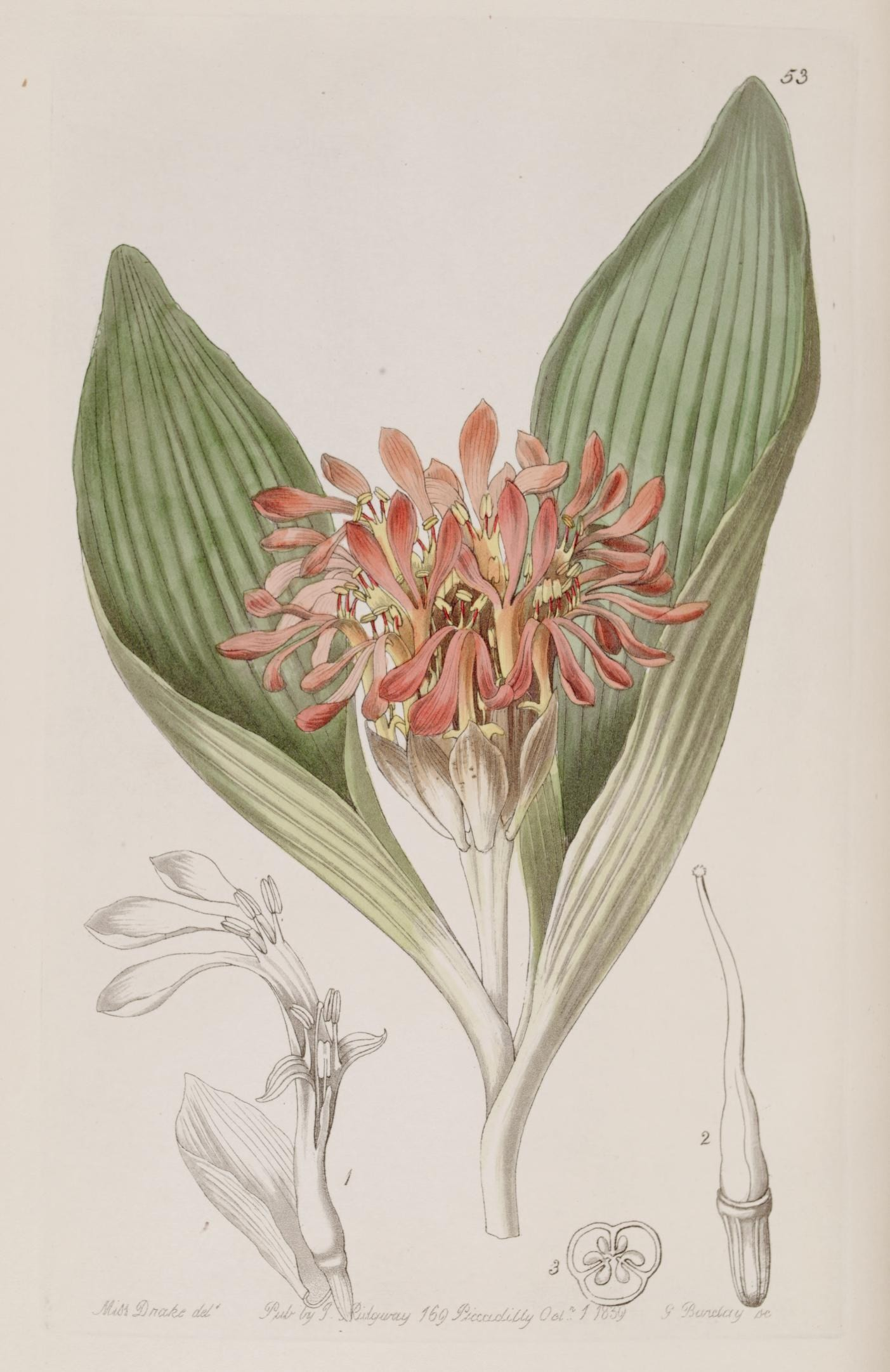
Illustration from 1839

Daubenya aurea is a species of Daubenya found growing as a geophytic bulb in Roggeveld Mountains in North Cape Province, South Africa.
