= Vagn F. Flyger =

Danish-American wildlife biologist (1922–2006)

- Born: January 14, 1922; Aalborg, Denmark
- Died: January 9, 2006 (aged 83); Silver Spring, Maryland, United States
- Citizenship: United States (1942-2006)

Academic background
- Education: Cornell University (BS); Pennsylvania State University (MS); Johns Hopkins University (PhD)

Academic work
- Discipline: Wildlife biologist Zoologist
- Sub-discipline: Squirrel specialist
- Institutions: University of Maryland

Vagn F. Flyger (January 14, 1922 – January 9, 2006) was a Danish-American wildlife biologist and one of the world's foremost authorities on squirrels. His landmark work was The 1968 Squirrel "Migration" In The Eastern United States. Flyger was also one of the first wildlife biologists to utilize tranquilizer guns in the 1950s when they were first introduced. In the 1960s, he experimented with dart guns in the Arctic on seals, whales and polar bears. However, seeking a field of study that kept him closer to home, Flyger focused most of his remaining research on squirrels.

== Background ==
Vagn Folkmann Flyger was born on January 14, 1922, in Aalborg, Denmark, and his family immigrated to Jamestown, New York, in 1923. Their home in Western New York was within walking distance of Chautauqua Lake, in addition to many streams, peat bogs, fields and forests. These environs were teeming with wildlife, and he spent his youth catching an abundance of snakes, insects and other little animals. At a young age, Flyger decided that he wanted to become a biologist, perhaps even an entomologist or herpetologist.

After his freshman year at Cornell University, Flyger enlisted in the U.S. Army in October 1942 from Ithaca, New York. He served from 1942 to 1946, 18 months of which were in Europe as a medical and surgical technician in the 1263rd combat engineer battalion.

== Education ==
Flyger attended Cornell University and graduated in 1948 with a bachelor's degree in zoology. In 1952, he received a master's degree in wildlife management from Pennsylvania State University and in 1956 earned a doctoral degree in vertebrate ecology from Johns Hopkins University. His studies focused on mammalian ecology and wildlife habitats.

== Work ==
=== Deer in Maryland ===
After graduating from Johns Hopkins, Flyger worked as a research biologist for the state of Maryland at their Chesapeake Biological Laboratory in Solomons, Maryland. He collected extensive data on deer, which assisted in regulating the white-tailed deer population in the state. His methods of analyzing the deer population are still considered foundational in deer management in the state.

Flyger also developed the use of a syringe gun (the "Cap-Chur Gun") which would sedate the deer for transfer and study. In the late 1950s, hunters in Maryland were clamoring for more deer, while, at the same time, the Aberdeen Proving Ground had an overabundance of deer. Using the Cap-Chur Gun and traps, Flyger and his colleagues transferred 1500 white-tailed deer from the Aberdeen Proving Ground into the northern areas of the state where there were little or no deer. Although the hunters were pleased with the restocking, the farmers began experiencing trouble with deer eating their crops. Flyger then developed a method he had learned in the Army during WWII to scare off the deer by setting up strings of M80s, which proved very effective. However, some poachers had their fingers blown off, so the method was abandoned, though Flyger continued to believe that this system had merit.

=== Polar expeditions ===
His work with the syringe tipped arrows in Maryland led Flyger to believe that it might be a useful tool with larger mammals. A Norwegian company gave him the funds to travel to the Arctic to test his equipment on whales. He spent two summers in the Arctic (around Kendall Island in the Northwest Territory) with the Inuit, adapting the devices so that they could function in the extreme cold and be able to penetrate the skin and blubber layers of the whale.

In 1966, Flyger and Dr. Martin Schein, traveled to the Arctic Research Laboratory in Point Barrow, Alaska, to use the sedation guns on polar bears so that they could be tagged or marked for research about their numbers and movements. The following year, Flyger traveled with an international team of scientists to Svalbard, Norway.

At the time of these expeditions, the National Aeronautics and Space Administration (NASA) was interested in utilizing satellites for tracking polar bears, so Flyger and Schein experimented with placing collars (simulating transmitters) on the bears. However, in the end, NASA underwent funding cuts, and the satellite tracking never happened with the polar bears.

In the summer of 1963 and 1964, Flyger traveled to Ross Island in the Antarctic to study the effects of three immobilizing drugs on Weddell seals, using the automatic projectile syringe.

=== Squirrel Studies ===
Following his graduation from Cornell, Flyger worked as a game biologist for the state of Maryland, and began his research with squirrels. This led to the discovery that half of the females being killed during the hunting season were either pregnant or nursing. Flyger recommended that the squirrel hunting season be delayed into October, and this has been the schedule since the 1950s.

In 1968, the Smithsonian Institution formed the Center for Short-Lived Phenomena, which was established to study short-lived natural phenomena such as earthquakes, volcanoes, and other unusual ecological events. Flyger requested to be notified by the Center of any squirrel migrations and, soon after, was informed about an unusual squirrel migration occurring from North Carolina into Tennessee. This was one of the first events in which the center became involved. Flyger examined several hundreds of squirrel carcasses found in the area and wrote his doctoral dissertation on the subject. He determined that the "migration" was a result of a rise in squirrel births which happened to coincide with a poor acorn crop, causing them to seek food in unfamiliar territories.

Flyger devised a number of marking systems for tracking the movements of squirrels in both urban and rural environments, including the use of radio collars. He created nesting boxes to facilitate the study of squirrels along with many feeding devices that challenged the squirrels' intelligence, memory, and agility. He was well known for distributing "wanted" posters throughout the countryside requesting that road-kill squirrels be sent to the Natural Resources Institute at the University of Maryland, College Park, where he was Chair of the Department of Forestry, Fish and Wildlife. Unfortunately, some people took it upon themselves to mail dead carcasses through the Post Office. However, these and other squirrels that he collected over a half-century provided valuable information about diseases, parasites, population, environmental factors, among other findings. Flyger's decades of research on squirrels included the endangered Delmarva fox squirrel and flying squirrels. His work with flying squirrels was the subject of a BBC documentary.

=== Educator ===
In 1962, Flyger became a faculty member at the University of Maryland's Natural Resources Institute. In addition to his research, he taught at the University for 25 years. He was a well-respected and popular professor at the University, who inspired many students to enter the field of wildlife conservation and mentored many young professionals. One of Flyger's most significant contributions to the field may have been his ability to educate the public about wildlife in an engaging, informative and interesting manner. Flyger was also known for his quick wit and dry humor, and was often interviewed by newspapers, magazines, and other media. The backyard of his home in Silver Spring, Maryland, opened into parkland, which made it a refuge for squirrels and other wildlife. Even after his retirement, when he became an emeritus professor, it was the site of on-going research, interviews and documentaries. He was interviewed by the National Wildlife Federation, National Geographic, and the BBC in this wooded setting.

=== Later life and death ===
Dr. Flyger retired from the University of Maryland in 1987.

Flyger passed away on January 9, 2006, at his home in Silver Spring, Maryland, from congestive heart failure.
