= Earthwatch Institute =

Scientific field research institute

- Formation: 1971
- Legal status: Foundation
- Purpose: Environmental Research
- Headquarters: Boston, Massachusetts, United States
- Region served: Worldwide
- President & CEO: Gitte Venicx
- Website: www.earthwatch.org

Earthwatch Institute is an international environmental charity. It was founded in 1971 as Educational Expeditions International by Bob Citron and Clarence Truesdale. Earthwatch Institute supports Ph.D. researchers internationally and conducts over 100,000 hours of research annually using the citizen science methodology. Earthwatch's mission statement states that the organization "connects people with scientists worldwide to conduct environmental research and empowers them with the knowledge they need to conserve the planet." As such, it is one of the global underwriters of scientific field research in climate change, archaeology, paleontology, marine life, biodiversity, ecosystems and wildlife. For over fifty years, Earthwatch has raised funds to recruit individuals, students, teachers, and corporate fellows to participate in field research to understand nature's response to accelerating global change.

Earthwatch Citizen Science Projects are peer-reviewed, Ph.D.-led scientific field research that allow everyday citizens to join research teams around the world to collect field data in areas such as climate change, wildlife conservation, rainforest ecology, marine science, and archaeology.

Earthwatch staff also lead many in-house projects, such as their Climate Change Masterclass, a virtual education program centering on corporate sustainability, Operation Healthy Air, which provides tools and training for air quality monitoring in vulnerable areas and supports action to improve air quality, and Global Pollinator Watch, a partnership with iNaturalist that supports pollinator research by enabling citizen scientists to observe pollinators in their habitat. Global Pollinator Watch participants have recorded over 495,000 pollinator observations as of 2024.

By paying to spend time on a project ranging from a few days to several weeks, volunteers, corporations, and foundations support critical field research both financially and by providing a workforce to collect data. Participants gain first-hand experience with science, the scientists, and the research areas.

== Organization and history ==
Earthwatch headquarters are in Boston, Massachusetts. They also have offices in Oxford, England; Melbourne, Australia; Gurgaon, India; and Tokyo, Japan.

Earthwatch was started as Educational Expeditions International in 1971 by Bob Citron, who was a Smithsonian Institution employee, and Clarence Truesdale, the superintendent of Vermont public schools. In 1972, Brian A. Rosborough joined Educational Expeditions International as a volunteer and six months later became president of the newly named Earthwatch. The organization quickly expanded, partnering with scientists around the world to confront threats to wildlife and the environment.

Since 1971, Earthwatch has made notable achievements in environmental research and policymaking. These include

- Fielding 1,430 research projects in 131 countries and 46 U.S. states, which have yielded over 2,000 peer-reviewed research publications.
- Producing research that has informed approximately 1,200 official environmental policies and wildlife management plans at the local, regional, national, and international levels.
- Providing Earthwatch projects over 7 years of support, on average, enabling long-term research goals.
- Sending more than 200,000 volunteers into the field to support scientists in the field as research assistants.

Earthwatch Australia is a partner in Bush Blitz, operated by Australian Biological Resources Study with co-funding by Bush Blitz founding partner BHP Billiton.

== Research focus areas and impacts ==
Earthwatch prioritizes support for research projects that align with the UN Sustainable Development Goals (SDGs).

All projects must contribute to one or more of the following SDGs below and incorporate actions "to combat climate change and its impacts." (SDG 13)

- In alignment with UN Sustainable Development Goal 15 (Terrestrial Ecosystems) Earthwatch’s Terrestrial Ecosystems Programs focus on the nexus of habitat preservation and restoration, assessing and mitigating the impacts of a changing climate, and the conservation of biodiversity.
- In alignment with UN Sustainable Development Goal 14 (Ocean Ecosystems), Earthwatch’s Ocean Ecosystems Programs focus on conserving biodiversity in marine ecosystems, including open oceans, seas, coral reefs, seagrass beds, kelp forests, and coastal areas, including estuaries, mangrove forests, and saltwater marshes.
- In alignment with UN Sustainable Development Goal 11 (Sustainable Cities and Communities), Earthwatch’s Sustainable Cities and Communities Programs focus on research that creates more resilient urban environments.

Earthwatch-supported research has impacted scientific progress and environmental policy in a number of areas. Below are a few relevant examples.

- In 2001, Earthwatch volunteer James Murphy unearths a near-complete skeleton of a new genus of dinosaur in the Argentinian Andes, on an excavation led by Dr. Oscar Alcober. The genus, Eodromaeus murphi, is named after Murphy.
- Earthwatch-supported research in Belize under Dr. Demian Chapman has led to the listing of five shark species of concern by the Convention on International Trade in Endangered Species (CITES) and the 2020 passage of a comprehensive fisheries bill that protects all rays within 200 nautical miles of its coastline and allows for greater protections of endangered sharks. Chapman’s team also helped cut the total shark catch in Belize from 2018 to 2019 in half by enlisting local shark fishers to tag and release their catches for pay as part of the project.
- In 2022, nine years of wildlife monitoring data collected by Earthwatch volunteers in Costa Rica culminated in the designation of Golfo Dulce as an Important Marine Mammals Area, bringing increased protection for whales, dolphins, and other wildlife.
- 26 years of permafrost data collected by Earthwatch Volunteers research in Canada's Mackenzie Mountains much of it collected by Earthwatch volunteers, has documented an average warming of 0.98 °C—bringing all sites studied dangerously close to thawing. Data from this expedition was cited in Intergovernmental Panel on Climate Change (IPCC) reports in 2019.

== Earthwatch expeditions ==
Recent research expeditions being fielded by Earthwatch scientists and volunteers from around the world include:

- Amazon Riverboat Exploration. Advancing strategies for community-based wildlife management and conservation in rural areas of Loreto, Peru that facilitate sustainable hunting for local communities and ensure that nationally protected areas and conservation concessions work with local populations.
- Animals of Malawi in the Majete Wildlife Reserve - Helping African wildlife return to and thrive in their native habitats.
- Archaeology of the Mongolian Steppe - Conducting archaeological research to study the historical significance of the Ikh Nart Nature Reserve in Mongolia.
- Blazing the Biodiversity Trail in Brazil - Learning about conservation and biodiversity by observing the movements of wildlife in Brazil.
- Butterflies and Bees in the Indian Himalayas - Examining the effects of climate change on the Himalayas by examining pollinators and the crops that need them.
- Carnivores of Madagascar - Conserving and developing program to secure the survival of endemic carnivores, their prey, and habitat in and around Ankarafantsika National Park, Madagascar, focusing on the fossa (Cryptoprocta ferox).
- Climate change and caterpillars - Examining plant-insect-parasitoid interactions. This project conducts quantitative tests on how climate change and extreme weather disrupt tri-trophic interaction, leading to herbivore outbreaks. It also looks at how the disruption of interaction diversity causes unstable ecosystems.
- Climate Change and Landscape in Borneo’s Rainforests - Assessing biodiversity, ecosystem functioning, regenerative capacity, conservation value and restoration requirements in degraded forests and forest fragments in Borneo.
- Climate change at the Arctic's edge - Quantifying the consequences of climate-induced environmental change by studying tree lines and permafrost in the research area.
- Climate Change in the Mackenzie Mountains - Studying the effects of global warming in the Arctic.
- Climate Change in Wytham Woods - Aiming to find forest management methods and investigates the effect of fragmentation and management history on temperate forests' reaction to climate in the UK. Part inofthe HSBC Climate Program.
- Conserving Koala Country - Investigating the response of koalas to environmental change in the Great Otway National Park and surrounding private land ('the Otways') to provide critical information for the conservation of their populations and habitats.
- Conserving Leopards and Monkeys in South Africa - Gathering critical information to protect leopards and monkeys under threat in South Africa.
- Coral Communities in Seychelles - Despite being recognized as one of the most biodiverse ecosystems in the world with enormous economic value, reefs are threatened by both anthropogenic and natural phenomena. This project examines critical characteristics of reefs and associated communities around Curieuse Island to advance understanding of species responses to future climate changes and how the local community is affected.
- Costa Rican Sea Turtles - Understanding the behavior of leatherback sea turtle (Dermochelys coriacea) and the impacts of human activities on these turtles on the beaches of the Pacific coast.
- Encountering the Prehistoric People of New Mexico - Pioneering excavations of prehistoric quarries in the Valles Caldera and discover how humans interacted with this volcanic landscape 10,000 years ago.
- Excavating the Roman Empire in Britain - Excavating a previously unknown Romano-British site of significant importance discovered in Devon. Research on this site will contribute to understanding life in the Romano-British world.
- Exploring an Active Volcano in Nicaragua - Investigating how an active volcano shapes the world around it? Peer into the crater of the Masaya Volcano to find out.
- Exploring Boston's Urban Forest - Investigating and exploring Boston's urban forest, which is made up of thousands of trees between and among human structures.
- Exploring Lions and their Prey in Kenya - Investigating whether inventive livestock management can bring balance between lions, other predators, and prey in the Kenyan savanna.
- Following Darwin's Finches in the Galapagos - Studying how foods introduced by humans are changing the face of the iconic Darwin's finch in the Galápagos Islands.
- Freshwater Watch - Using Citizen Science to investigate the health of global freshwater ecosystems on an unprecedented scale. This is a research project using Citizen Science to investigate the health of global freshwater ecosystems on a scale never seen before. Using citizens to collect water quality data across the globe, with data from Hong Kong, Brazil and other locations used in peer-reviewed publications.
- Investigating Threats to Chimps in Uganda - Exploring interactions between people and chimpanzees and other primates in the rainforest of Uganda to improve human–primate relationships.
- Investigating Whales and Dolphins of the Norwegian Arctic - Studying the behaviors and needs of arctic whales and dolphins amid spectacular scenery.
- Loons and the Gulf of Mexico Oil Spill - Monitoring the survivorship and health of common loon breeding populations along the Louisiana coast after the Deepwater Horizon oil spill, which in April 2010 released over 250 million gallons of crude oil into the Gulf of Mexico. The impacts on residents and migratory wildlife are likely to last a decade or more. This research project monitors the survivorship and health of common loon breeding populations along the Louisiana coast and will contribute to U.S. Fish & Wildlife Service's National Resource Damage and Assessment process.
- Loons of the Canadian Prairie - Investigating what can be learned about the loons of Louisiana's coast by following them 2,000 miles north to their summer breeding grounds.
- Mammals of Nova Scotia - Addressing how temperate ecosystems, and their biodiversity, landscapes, and wildlife, which are prevalent in most parts of the industrialized world, are being affected and often degraded by human activities and climate change.
- Mammoth Graveyard in South Dakota - Generating information on morphological adaptations of the Columbian mammoth (Mammuthus columbi) as its habitat was reduced by sea level rise in the post-Pleistocene era.
- Of Mountains and Marmots: Climate Change in the French Alps - This project will investigate the population dynamics of marmots (as a model species) in the alpine region - a region strongly affected by changes in climate. The results will provide valuable information to help predict wildlife responses to climate change and support effective conservation management.
- On the Trail of Giant Pandas in China - Studying and working with work with pandas in captivity In the Sichuan province of China to help them adapt to life in the wild so that they may breed and live longer and healthier lives.
- Origins of Angkor - Excavating the village of Ban Non-Wat in Thailand, and the surrounding area, looking at changes in socio-environmental interactions and resource use, and relating this to present-day issues
- Project Manta - Conducting a comprehensive study of manta rays (Manta birostris and M. alfredi) to enhance knowledge of the species, develop a Manta Identification Database, generate economic and social benefits, and provide a basis for long-term monitoring of its environment.
- Puerto Rico's Rainforest - Implementing sustainable management of timber production in the Las Casas de la Selva Tabonuco forest, using line-planting techniques to ensure maintenance of biodiversity and conservation of the soil.
- Recovery of the Reef - Researching fundamental microbial mechanisms responsible for black band disease (BBD) pathogenesis in coral populations through a combined field-based and laboratory approach.
- Safeguarding Whales and Dolphins in Costa Rica - Searching a tropical “inner sea” for endangered dolphins and whales in Costa Rica.
- Scouting Foxes, Badgers, and Hedgehogs in England - Alongside researchers, answering the question of what is really going on with the creatures you see scampering in your garden.
- Shark Conservation in Belize - Engaging stakeholders with shark conservation and collect data that will influence policymakers to establish marine reserves to ensure the continued persistence of endangered sharks in Belize.
- Snorkeling to Protect Reefs in The Bahamas - Using snorkeling to protect fragile coral reefs and benefit from their resources.
- South African Penguins -Investigating the reasons behind the rapid decline of the African penguin (Spheniscus demersus) and potential mitigation strategies.
- South Africa's Hyenas - Understanding the ecology and ecosystem functioning of scavengers in the Northwest Province, mainly brown hyaena (Parahyaena brunnea) to increase public appreciation for the value and function of scavengers within ecosystems.
- Swimming with Sea Turtles in the Bahamas - Helping scientists find out where endangered sea turtles thrive and protecting these critical habitats.
- Thinking Like an Elephant in Thailand - Working to reduce human-elephant conflict through understanding elephant behavior and supporting youth education programs.
- Tracking Beavers Through German Waters - How do beavers shape Germany's Lower Rhine—and can we keep them from clashing with the people who live there?
- Tracking Costa Rica's Mammals - Investigating whether farmers can help revive Costa Rica's forests by studying elusive wild mammals for clues.
- Uncovering the Mysteries of Ancient Colorado - Digging into the ancient past to understand the most significant shift in human history: from hunting and gathering to farming.
- Unearthing Ancient History in Tuscany - Helping dust off clues about Italy's ancient people from the ruins they left along the coast of Tuscany.
- Walking with African Wildlife - Understanding the ecological processes that facilitate and maintain the diversity of animals within the Hluhluwe-iMfolozi Park in South Africa.
- Whales and Dolphins Under the California Sun - Exploring ways to do a better job of sharing the ocean with whales and dolphins in one of the U.S.’s most populous areas.
- Wildlife in the Changing French Pyrenees - Joining efforts to discover and protect this delicate Alpine environment from climate change and human impact.
- Wildlife of Australia’s Rainforest - Investigating the impact of climate change on the habitats and wildlife of Australia’s rainforests.
- Wildlife of the Mongolian Steppe - Studying and conserving the wildlife in Ikh Nart Nature Reserve, including the "near-threatened" argali—the most prominent mountain sheep in the world. The successful results from this work have been used to develop improved conservation management policies in the reserve, and the research team has expanded their studies to include several other species as well as work in another nature reserve.

=== Previously funded expeditions ===
Earthwatch has been successful in completing environmental scientific research throughout its history. Some recently completed research includes:

- Animals in the Outback - Investigating the impacts of integrated pest management strategies on native fauna species in an open (non-fenced) system in Australia for development of an optimal predator control program.
- Arabian Leopards on the Edge in Oman - Build national capacity for safeguarding the long-term viability of the Arabian leopard and its habitat in Jebel Samhan through provision of baseline habitat and population data to establish a conservation plan for mitigating human-wildlife conflict, habitat loss and other threats, and to set up a framework for long term population and habitat monitoring.
- Australia's Vanishing Frogs - Assessing the status of seriously threatened frogs in the rainforests of eastern Australia and investigating frog populations that may be resistant to a fungus contributing to amphibian decline in Australia.
- Before and after in Belize: Testing a Marine Reserve - Providing information needed for local conservation and management of queen conch (Strombus gigas) and lobster (Panulirus argus) and testing the effectiveness of marine reserves for conserving and managing fisheries.
- Canopies, Climate, and Critters of the Ecuadorian Rainforest - How many species of plants and animals make their home in the magnificent rainforests of the Ecuadorian Andes?
- Cheetah Conservation in Namibia - Securing habitat for the long-term survival of the cheetah (Acinonyx jubatus) and its ecosystem through multi-disciplined, integrated programs in research, conservation and education.
- Climate Change in Brazil's Atlantic Forests - Part of the HSBC Climate Partnership which aims to find methods of managing forests that will maximize the benefits we derive from them into the future. Investigating effect of fragmentation and the history of forest management systems with respect to climate change in a tropical biodiversity hotspot, at Rio Cachoeira Reserve.
- Climate Change in Chesapeake Bay Forests - Part of the HSBC Climate Program which aims to find methods for managing forests that will maximize the benefits we derive from them into the future. Investigating the effect of management history on response of mixed deciduous forest to climate.
- Climate Change in China's Gutianshan Forests - Part of the HSBC Climate Program which aims to find methods of managing forests that will maximize the benefits we derive from them into the future. Investigating the effect of fragmentation and management systems on response of broad-leafed forests to climate change.
- Climate Change in India's Western Ghat Forests - Part of the HSBC Climate Program which aims to find methods for managing forests that will maximize the benefits we derive from them into the future. Investigating the effect of fragmentation and management systems on response of mixed forests to climate change in a biodiversity hotspot.
- Conserving Grevy's Zebra in the Samburu District - Monitoring the distribution, population dynamics and interactions of Grevy's zebra (Equus grevyi), in Samburu, Kenya for conservation and management of the species.
- Costa Rican Coffee from Community to Cup - Exploring the value of forest fragments to pollination and the conservation of biological diversity in the Tarrazu coffee agroecosystems, as well as exploring the relationship between farmer management practices and soil quality, coffee productivity and quality, and the surrounding environment in the Los Santos/Tarrazú region.
- Daintree Hidden Coastline - Protecting Australia's fragile Daintree River coastline from land clearing, pesticides, and climate change.
- Darwin's Finches and Natural Selection in the Galapagos - Earthwatchers helped protect the iconic Darwin's finches of the Galapagos Islands.
- Digging for the Deep World of Devon's Roman Ruins - Earthwatchers investigated the function of a rich archaeological site from Roman times discovered in Devon, England.
- Discovering Italy's Ancient Roman Coast - Filling key gaps in the knowledge of the industrial history and coastal economy of Populonia and its territory, from the early Roman period (250/200 BCE) to the early Middle Ages (600 CE).
- Dolphins of Greece - Studying the behavior and ecology of the bottlenose dolphin (Tursiops truncates) in the Ambracian Gulf and investigating how human activities - mainly fisheries and pollution - affect the dolphins.
- Dolphins of the Egyptian Red Sea - The project seeks to provide the necessary scientific information to develop targeted policies and strategies for cetacean conservation.
- Easter Island (Rapa Nui) Cultural Heritage - Investigating the changing nature of agricultural production and development on Rapa Nui, learning the roles of climate and human-induced factors in causing the civilization's failure.
- Encountering the Prehistoric People of New Mexico - This project aims to increase knowledge of long-term human use of this unique high elevation volcanic environment in northern New Mexico, and to use that knowledge to better understand how humans have adapted to and transformed the landscape over 10,000 years.
- Exploring San Francisco's Urban Forest - Why, exactly, do cities like San Francisco need trees? Help us discover the true worth of the benefits they bring.
- Fort Arbeia and the Roman Empire in Britain - Archaeological excavations of a Roman fort on Hadrian's Wall, in South Shields, UK - part of a UNESCO World Heritage Site - to inform development, management and conservation of the site.
- Freshwater Turtles of the Kimberley - Determining the population status and conservation needs of freshwater turtles of the Kimberley Plateau, Western Australia, and provide insight into the freshwater biodiversity of the region.
- Geology and the Shaping of the American Southwest - Advancing understanding of the geometry of the faults that characterize the Rio Grande Rift basin. Yielding data on how to manage water supplies, particularly in light of industrial pollution.
- Great Ape Conservation in Cameroon - Working to protect endangered great apes outside of protected areas and support alternative local livelihoods.
- Into the Al Hajar with the Arabian Tahr - Using the Arabian Tahr as a focal 'umbrella‘ species. The project will work closely with in-country scientists, to develop in-country conservation research capacity and provide pathways for the implementation of conservation management, including the development of a workshop mediated Arabian Tahr Conservation Action Plan.
- Leopards, Hyaenas and Primates: Mammal Conservation in South Africa - Understanding the ecology and status of biodiversity within the Soutpansberg Mountain Range and developing management strategies for conservation and mitigation of human/wildlife conflict.
- Mangroves and Reefs of the Bahamas - The Bahamian archipelago is a fast-developing region where the marine environment is highly impacted by human activities. This research is studying connectivity between mangroves and patch reefs, to determine fish movement between the two habitats and the factors important for ensuring good connectivity and therefore healthy fish populations on Bahamian reefs.
- Meet the Meerkats of the Kalahari - Understanding the dynamics of cooperative breeders and the impacts of disturbances on populations through research on Kalahari meerkats (Suricata suricatta).
- Melbourne's Microbats - Trapping and recording bats to establish baseline data on critical habitat requirements and enable management of urban landscapes for bat habitation in Australia, for their conservation.
- Monitoring Brazil's Wildlife Corridors - One of the largest threats to biodiversity is the fragmentation of natural habitat and the resulting isolation of small populations of animals. This research project aims assess the potential of the Araguaia River valley as a functioning wildlife corridor between the grassland Cerrado and the Amazon through a study of five key species (jaguar, giant river otter, giant piraiba catfish, Amazon River dolphin, and the black caiman), with the aim of recommending and implementing management policies along the corridor based on the results.
- Mountain Waters of the Czech Republic - Evaluating trends related to pollution, climate change, and alternative watershed practices in the decline and recovery of the Jizera mountain ecosystems and the services they provide.
- Orangutans, Gibbons, and Borneo's Bawan Rainforest - The island of Borneo is one of the most bio-diverse regions on Earth. It also suffers one of the highest rates of deforestation. By describing the biodiversity of the Bawan forest, this research project aims to justify its protection, and support local community livelihoods.
- Paradise Wood: Experimental Plantation in England - Studies to help forest managers grow trees successfully in light of predicted climate change.
- Protecting the Rivers of California's Wine Country - How can nature and people coexist successfully in California's threatened wine country?
- Protecting the Rivers of the California Delta - How can ecologists help to restore riverside habitats in Central California's agricultural Delta?
- Rainforest Canopies and Wildlife in Ecuador - The project monitors large animal and bird populations of the Santa Lucia Reserve in the Ecuadorian rainforest. Because these animals need high quality forest habitat to survive, they act as “umbrella species” whose protection will also ensure the conservation of other animals and plants. Data collected will help determine whether existing areas offer sufficient protection in the face of climate change.
- Restoring Easter Island's (Rapa Nui's) Forests - Examining the role of prehistoric rock mulching and rock placement in gardens and agricultural fields by the Rapa Nui as a way of creating a sustainable. agricultural system.
- Sampling Vineyard Ecology and Biodiversity in Bordeaux/Wildlife and Wine in Bordeaux - Enhancing and monitoring biodiversity in wine-producing landscapes through the development of more sustainable practices and farmscaping methods.
- Saving Kenya's Black Rhinos - Quantifying the impact of either increased or reduced herbivore density on the distribution of black rhino (Diceros bicornis) and on the ecosystem at the Olpejeta Conservancy.
- SCAP SW Earth and Skies Through Time - Characterizing planetary surface processes and mapping the geology of northern Arizona locations using remote sensing data from Mars Odyssey or the Lunar Reconnaissance Obiter.
- Spotting Songbirds in the Rockies - Avian, pika and alpine, and mountain lion research in the Rocky Mountain region. Resident and migratory songbirds have been declining for the past 30 years. Earthwatch scientists are monitoring their populations and working to understand the cause these declines.
- Sydney's Hidden Mammals - Study of the ecology, behavior and social habits of the rakali (Hydromys chrysogaster) – a type of water rat - in Chowder Bay, New South Wales, Australia.
- Tagging the Terrapins of the Jersey Shore - Determining the effects of anthropogenic habitat disturbance on population dynamics and reproductive biology of the diamondback terrapin (Malaclemys terrapin) in New Jersey, United States, for conservation development.
- Tidal Forests of Kenya - Community conservation project working to restore mangroves in Kenya.
- Trinidad's Leatherback Sea Turtles - Trinidad supports one of the last 3 largest leatherback colonies in the world. This project continues to evaluate the ecology and population trends of the Trinidad population of leatherback turtles (Dermochelys coriacea), as well as investigating the effects of ecotourism on nesting turtles and the vulnerability of the colony and nesting beaches to climate change.
- Turtles in Trouble - Generating information for policy makers on how waste becomes dispersed in the sea and advising pollution legislation, through researching the impacts of pollution on endangered (IUCN Red List) marine turtles in Australian waters.
- Volcanology and Ecology in Iceland - Iceland's Eastern Volcanic Zone is one of the most geologically active areas in the world.
- Whales and Dolphins of the Hebrides - Identifying particular areas of importance or “hotspots” for whales, dolphins and porpoises through monitoring their distribution and relative abundance throughout the waters of western Scotland.
- Whales and Otters of British Columbia - Understanding the interdependency between the southern feeding aggregation of grey whale (Eschrichtius robustus) and their food supply (especially mysids).
- When Archosaurs Attacked and Reptiles Ruled Texas - The Arlington Archosaur Site (AAS) is unique in producing hundreds of fossils from a relatively unexplored section of Cretaceous rock, approximately 95-100 million years in age. This fossil site provides important information on ancient coastal ecosystems during a period of Earth history that was very different from today. With funding from Earthwatch, researchers continue to explore the site.

== See also ==
- Bioblitz
- Bush Blitz
- Conservation movement
- Ecology
- Environmental protection
- Environmentalism
- Nathaniel Spring
- Natural environment
- Natural capital
- Natural resource
- Plan B 2.0: Rescuing a Planet Under Stress and a Civilization in Trouble
- Renewable resource
- Sustainability
- Volunteer Vacation
