= Nathaniel Spring =

British conservationist and explorer (born 1971)

Nathaniel Spring (born 1971) is a British conservationist and explorer. He currently works for the Earthwatch Institute in Oxford, United Kingdom, where he is Senior Research Director.

Spring studied marine biology at Cardiff University. Since then he has been involved in a variety of expeditions, many of which are related to his work at Earthwatch. In 2004, he rowed 3,000 miles across the Atlantic and has also raced 550 km across Costa Rica by bike, kayak and on foot.

Most recently, Spring was part of a three-man research expedition to Greenland in 2009. In addition to climbing and exploring the area the team collected plants, contributing to a botanical inventory in East Greenland which was initiated in the 1960s. Several new peaks were recorded, one of which was named after Spring's paternal grandfather, Kenneth Spring.

Spring lives in Oxfordshire, England.
