= Volcanoes of the World =

Volcanology book first published in 1981

Volcanoes of the World is a book that was published in three editions in 1981, 1994, and 2010 as a collaboration between volcanologists around the world, and the Smithsonian Institution's Global Volcanism Program (GVP).

== Editions ==
The three editions of Volcanoes of the World were in 1981, 1994 and 2010 and are based on the GVP data and interpretations.

The subtitle of the second edition was A Regional Directory, Gazetteer, and Chronology of Volcanism during the last 10,000 years. It also identified the collaboration of Russell Blong, Johnathan Dehn, Christopher Newhall, Roland Pool, and Thomas C. Stein.

Tom Simkin, author involved with all three editions, was curator of Petrology and Volcanology at the National Museum of Natural History, as well as directing the Smithsonian's Global Volcanism Program between 1984 and 1994. He died in 2009

== Overview of previous summaries ==
The introduction in the second edition placed the text in context with previous books attempting to collate The Volcanoes of the World - as summaries in a range of languages, of global volcanic data back to Varenius in 1650.

- Varenius 1650
- Scrope 1825
- Daubeny 1826
- Van Hoff 1841
- Daubeny 1848
- Landgrebe 1855
- Scrope 1862
- Fuchs 1865
- Humboldt 1869
- Mercalli 1907
- Schneider 1911
- Sapper 1917
- CAVW 1951-75
- Katsui (ed) 1971
- Macdonald 1972
- Gushchenko 1979

== Online version ==
A digital version of the text was released in 2002.

== See also ==
- Timeline of volcanism on Earth
- Volcanic explosivity index
- Volcano Number
