= Bernhardus Varenius =

German geographer (1622-1650)

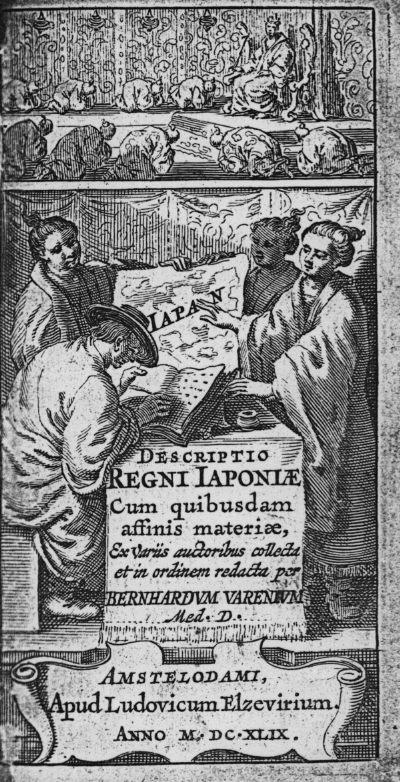
Frontispiece of Varen's Descriptio Regni Japoniae (1649)

Bernhardus Varenius (Bernhard Varen) (1622, Hitzacker, Holy Roman Empire – 1650) was a German geographer.

== Life ==
His early years (from 1627) were spent at Uelzen, where his father was court preacher to the duke of Brunswick. Varenius studied at the gymnasium of Hamburg (1640–1642), and at Königsberg (1643–1645) and Leiden (1645–1649) universities, where he devoted himself to mathematics and medicine, taking his medical degree at Leiden in 1649. He then settled at Amsterdam, intending to practice medicine. But the recent discoveries of Abel Tasman, Willem Schouten and other Dutch navigators, and his friendship for Willem Blaeu and other geographers, attracted Varenius to geography. He died in 1650, aged only twenty-eight, a victim to the privations and miseries of a poor scholar's life.

== Works ==
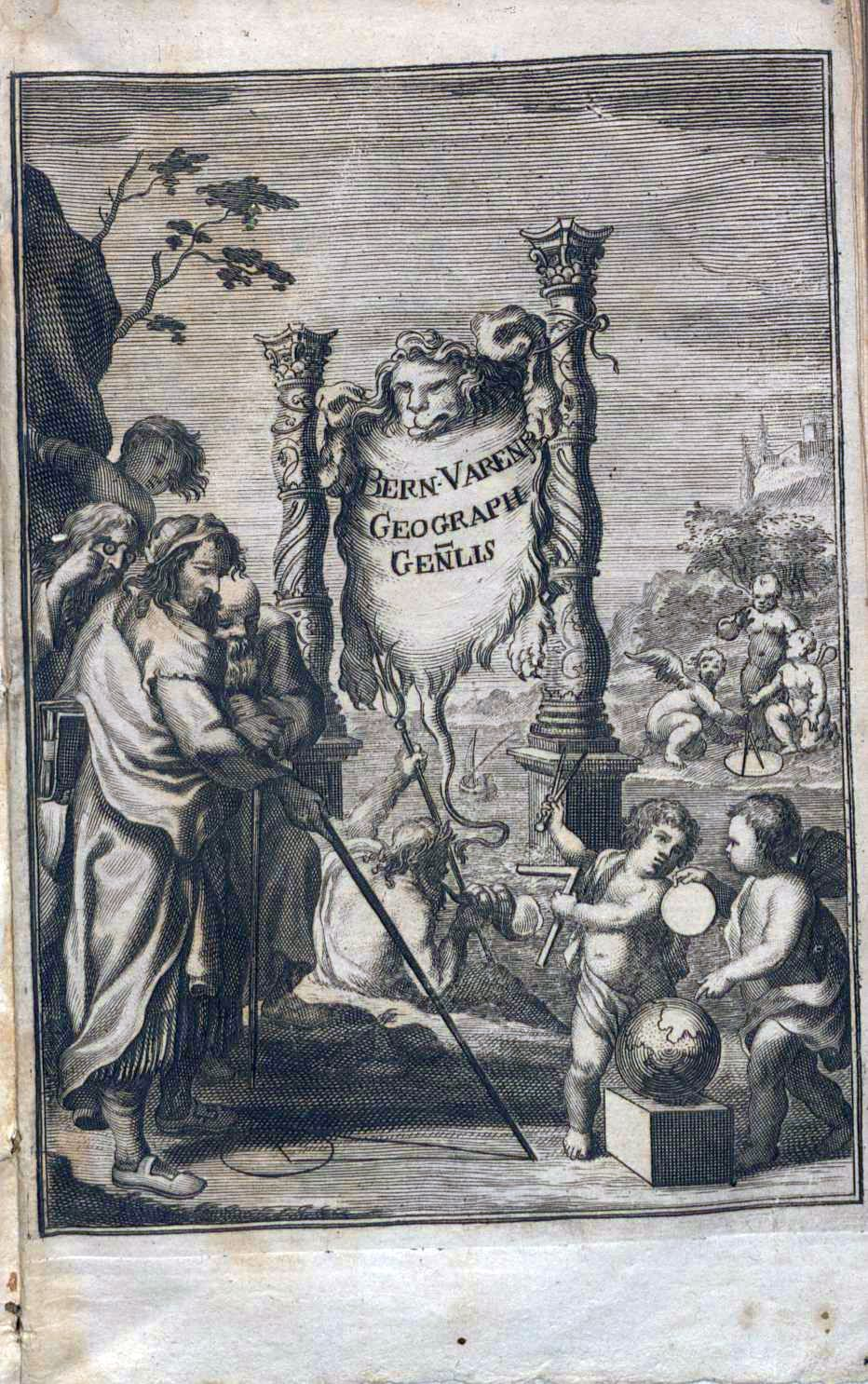
Geographia generalis, 1715

In 1649 he published, through L. Elzevir of Amsterdam, his Descriptio Regni Japoniae. In this was included a translation into Latin of part of Jodocus Schouten's account of Siam (Appendix de religione Siamensium, ex Descriptione Belgica Iodoci Schoutenii), and chapters on the religions and customs of various peoples. Next year (1650) appeared, also through Elzevir, the work by which he is best known, his Geographia Generalis, in which he endeavored to lay down the general principles of the subject on a wide scientific basis, according to the knowledge of his day. Varenius followed the Sphaera mundi (1620) of Giuseppe Biancani, though he also introduced ideas that had come into thinking during the intervening decades. The work is divided into (1) absolute geography, (2) relative geography and (3) comparative geography. The first investigates mathematical facts relating to the earth as a whole, its figure, dimensions, motions, their measurement, etc. The second part considers the earth as affected by the sun and stars, climates, seasons, the difference of apparent time at different places, variations in the length of the day, etc. The third part treats briefly the actual divisions of the surface of the earth, their relative positions, globe and map-construction, longitude, navigation, etc.

Varenius, with the materials at his command, dealt with the subject of geography in a truly philosophic spirit; and his work long held its position as the best treatise in existence on scientific and comparative geography. The work went through many editions. Sir Isaac Newton introduced several important improvements into the Cambridge edition of 1672; in 1715 James Jurin issued another Cambridge edition with a valuable appendix; in 1733 the whole work was translated into English by Dugdale; and in 1736 Dugdale's second edition was revised by Shaw. In 1716 an Italian edition appeared at Naples; in 1750 a Dutch translation followed; in 1751 Osman b. Abdulemennan translated it into Turkish; and in 1755 a French version, from Shaw's edition, came out at Paris. Among later geographers d'Anville and Alexander von Humboldt especially drew attention to Varen's genius and services to science.

== Editions ==
- Geographia generalis (in Latin). Napoli: Bernardino Gessari. 1715.

== See also ==
- Volcanoes of the World
