= Walter Kistler =

Swiss physicist (1918–2015)

Walter P. Kistler
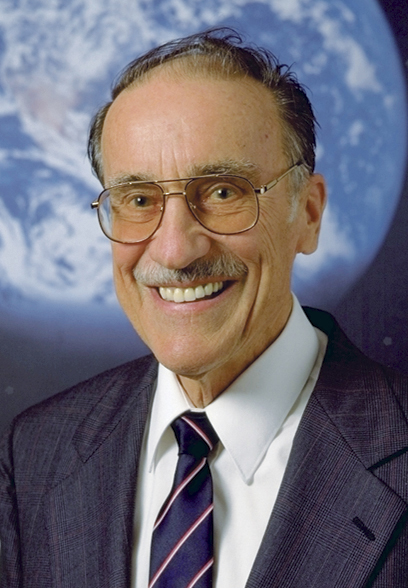
- Born: 1918; Biel, Switzerland
- Died: November 2, 2015 (aged 96–97); Redmond, United States
- Education: University of Geneva, ETH Zurich
- Known for: Multiple inventions, Kistler Group
- Awards: Albert F. Sperry Award (issued by the ISA); Aerospace Pioneer Award from the AIAA)
- Scientific career
- Fields: Physicist
- Workplaces: Swiss Locomotive and Machine Works, Bell Aircraft

Walter P. Kistler (1918 – November 2, 2015) was a physicist, inventor, and philanthropist, born in Biel, Switzerland. Kistler was a life member of the Swiss Physical Society and a member of AIAA and ISA, which presented him the Life Achievement Award in 2000. He held patents on more than 50 inventions in the scientific and industrial instrumentation fields, and had published a number of papers in scientific and trade journals. He was a major donor to a eugenics research organization, the Pioneer Fund.

== Education and first inventions ==
Kistler studied sciences at the University of Geneva and earned a master's degree in physics from the Swiss Federal Institute of Technology in Zurich. While subsequently head of the Instrumentation Lab at the Swiss Locomotive and Machine Works, Winterthur, he pioneered a new measurement technology using Piezo-electric quartz crystals as the transduction element in accelerometers, load cells, and pressure gauges. This new technology was made possible by Kistler's invention of a charge amplifier that could handle the very high impedance signals obtained from such sensors. For these achievements, he would in 1980 receive the prestigious Albert F. Sperry Award from the Instrument Society of America (ISA).

== Mid-life ==
In 1951, Kistler moved to the United States and joined Bell Aircraft, Buffalo, New York. At Bell, he invented and developed a pulse constraint servo-accelerometer that was later used in the guidance of the Agena space rocket. For this work, he received the 1968 Aerospace Pioneer Award from the American Institute of Aeronautics and Astronautics (AIAA), recognizing "his pioneering effort in the development of high-performance aerospace instrumentation." In 1954, Kistler founded Kistler Instrument Company in order to further pursue his work in quartz instrumentation. The company was incorporated in 1957. Under Kistler's supervision, his company made several major innovations, some of which would be put to use in the Apollo crewed spaceflights, and became a world leader in the development of quartz sensors.

Kistler sold the company, which currently is known as Kistler Group, in 1968 and moved to Seattle, Washington. In 1974, he founded with his partner Charles Morse the Kistler-Morse Corporation. Kistler supervised and designed a number of innovations in sensors while at this company, and in 1982 he was named an ISA Fellow for his contributions in the field of sensor development. In the 1960s, Kistler developed a shorthand writing system that he called Steno, and initiated a project called The Steno Trust in 1997 to teach the system for applications in education, industry, and law. In Kistler's view, the greatest application of Steno is in the writing of journals.

== Later life ==
In his later life, Kistler acted as director or chairman to several high-tech startups. These companies include Kistler Products, SRS, ICI, Interpoint, Paroscientific, and SPACEHAB, Inc. In 1993 he co-founded Kistler Aerospace Corporation, which was intended to produce a reusable space vehicle.

In 1996 Kistler co-founded (with Bob Citron) the Foundation For the Future. The Foundation's original stated goal was to "increase knowledge about the factors that may have a major impact on the long-term future of humanity." The Foundation For the Future awards the annual Kistler Prize to scientists and research institutions that have "made original, substantive, and innovative contributions in the study of the connections between the human genome and human society." The Kistler Prize has not been awarded since 2011.

In 2008, the Southern Poverty Law Center reported that Kistler was the sole donor to the Pioneer Fund, a designated hate group originally founded in 1937 to promote eugenics.
