= Collaborative Summer Library Program =

Nonprofitable, charitable organization

The Collaborative Summer Library Program (CSLP) is a nonprofit, charitable organization that supports literacy, education and science through summer reading events in public libraries across the United States.

== History ==
CSLP began in 1987 with ten Minnesota regional library systems that joined to create a theme, artwork and program ideas for libraries to use for children's programming. It subsequently expanded to libraries throughout all fifty states and Washington D.C. to ensure all libraries can provide a high quality summer reading program. As of 2019, more than 4,800 libraries were participants.
