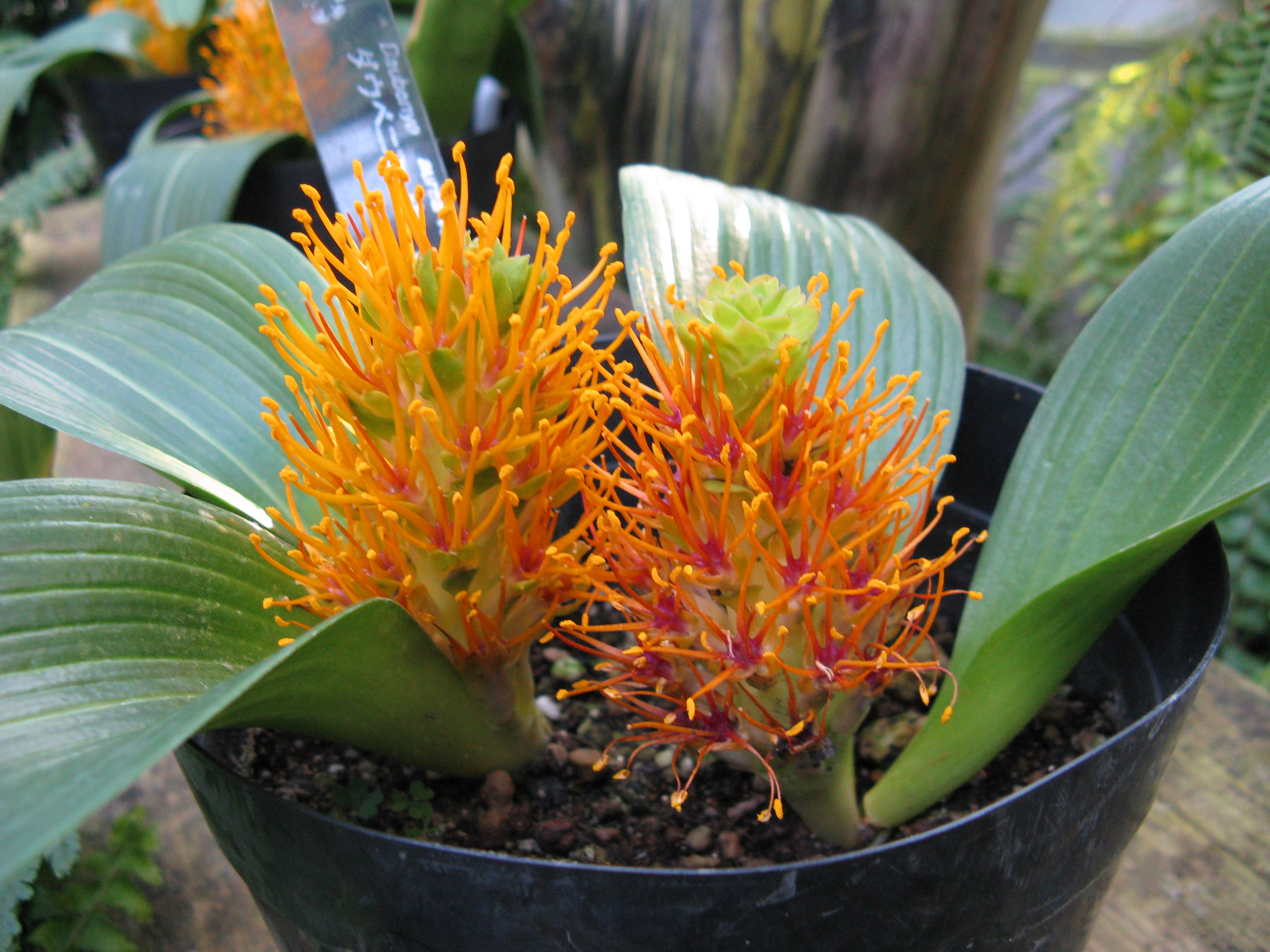
- Daubenya ?marginata in cultivation in Japan

Scientific classification
- Kingdom: Plantae
- Clade: Tracheophytes
- Clade: Angiosperms
- Clade: Monocots
- Order: Asparagales
- Family: Asparagaceae
- Subfamily: Scilloideae
- Genus: Daubenya; Lindl.

Type species
- Daubenya aurea

Synonyms
- Androsiphon Schltr.,1924; Neobakeria Schltr., 1924; Amphisiphon W.H.Baker, 1936

= Daubenya =

Genus of flowering plants

Daubenya is a genus of bulbous flowering plants in the family Asparagaceae, subfamily Scilloideae (also treated as the family Hyacinthaceae). It is native to the Cape Province of South Africa.

At first believed to consist of a single species, Daubenya aurea, the genus was expanded in 2000 to include the genera Androsiphon and Amphisiphon and various species that had previously been classified as Polyxena, Massonia, or Neobakeria. "The poor congruence between morphological and other characters within Hyacinthaceae has also made generic circumscriptions very difficult. One of the consequences of this has been the recognition of a large number of genera that are poorly defined morphologically."- (Speta 1998)

== Description ==
Species of Daubenya grow from bulbs covered with a brownish tunic. Each bulb produces only two leaves, which appear with the flowers and normally spread out along the ground on either side. The inflorescence is a raceme, usually very condensed and close to the ground. Individual flowers are white, pink, yellow or red, sometimes with the tepals furthest from the flowering stem (i.e. on the outside of the inflorescence) larger than the others. The tepals are fused at the base forming a distinct tube. The stamens arise from the mouth of this tube, and are often very prominent. The more or less globe-shaped black seeds are produced inside a papery capsule.

Species are variously pollinated by bees, butterflies, moths, the monkey beetle Lepisia glenlyonensis and sunbirds. The water-retaining nature of doleritic clays ensures their remaining moist for longer than clays formed from shales of the Karoo series. Exceptionally, D. namaquensisis, is found in deep red sands and D. zeyheri in calcareous coastal sands.

There is no formal conservation policy for Daubenya species and their future prospects remain bleak. Cultivated bulbs of D. aurea are on offer at commercial nurseries, though all the species are worthy of cultivation for their bright and often fragrant flowers.

== Species ==
As of March 2013, the World Checklist of Selected Plant Families recognized eight species: All but D. aurea were transferred to the genus Daubenya during revisions of the South African members of the Scilloideae in early 2000s; they were previously placed in Androsiphon, Amphisiphon, Polyxena, Massonia, or Neobakeria.

Image	Scientific name	Distribution
	Daubenya alba A.M.van der Merwe	Northern Cape Province.
	Daubenya aurea Lindl.	South Africa
	Daubenya capensis (Schltr.) A.M.van der Merwe & J.C.Manning (syn. Androsiphon capensis Schltr.)	northwest Cape
	Daubenya comata (Burch. ex Baker) J.C.Manning & A.M.van der Merwe (syn. Massonia comata Burch. ex Baker)	Free State, Northern Cape and the North Eastern parts of Western Cape
	Daubenya marginata (Willd. ex Kunth) J.C.Manning & A.M.van der Merwe (syn. Massonia marginata Willd. ex Kunth)	northwest Cape.
	Daubenya namaquensis (Schltr.) J.C.Manning & Goldblatt (syn. Neobakeria namaquensis Schltr.)	Namaqualand.
	Daubenya stylosa (W.H.Baker) A.M.van der Merwe & J.C.Manning (syn. Amphisiphon stylosus W.H.Baker)	Bokkeveld Plateau.
	Daubenya zeyheri (Kunth) J.C.Manning & A.M.van der Merwe (syn. Massonia zeyheri Kunth)	South Western Cape.
