= Center for Short-Lived Phenomena =

Office at the Smithsonian Institution

The Center for Short-Lived Phenomena (CSLP) was an office at the Smithsonian Institution from 1968 to 1975 designed to assist Smithsonian scientists in studying unusual short-lived natural phenomena such as meteorite impacts, volcanic events, earthquakes, and unusual ecological events such as plagues, extinctions, fish rains, and the effects of oil spill events.

CSLP published a series of scientific reports on unusual phenomena, as well as a 1972 paperback collection of unusual phenomena entitled Strange, Sudden, and Unexpected: True stories from the files of the Smithsonian Institution's Center for Short-lived Phenomena (ISBN 0-590-09380-0), which covered topics including:

- The 1970 Ancash earthquake and mudslide on Huascarán that consumed the town of Yungay, Peru.
- Floating islands
- A short-lived volcanic island in Tonga
- A report on the extinction of the Kouprey, later found to be incorrect.
- The 1970 flood of Bangladesh.

CSLP restructured in 1975, with some activities moved to other portions of the Smithsonian to become the Scientific Event Alert Network, and eventually the Global Volcanism Program. Some of its activities and data were subsequently maintained and operated as an independent non-profit entity under the Center for Short-Lived Phenomena name. CSLP was hired by Cahners Publishing Co. (since acquired by Reed-Elsevier) in 1977 to provide the pilot editorial content for the Oil Spill Intelligence Report newsletter. That publication was the first for Cahners' Newsletter Center business unit, later spun off as Cutter Information Corp (now Cutter Consortium). CSLP continued under contract to Cahners and then Cutter for such content for several years.

The CSLP features as a plot point in Renata Adler's 1976 novel Speedboat.
