= The Ramshorn =

University theatre in Glasgow, Scotland

Coordinates: 55.85969°N 4.2451°W

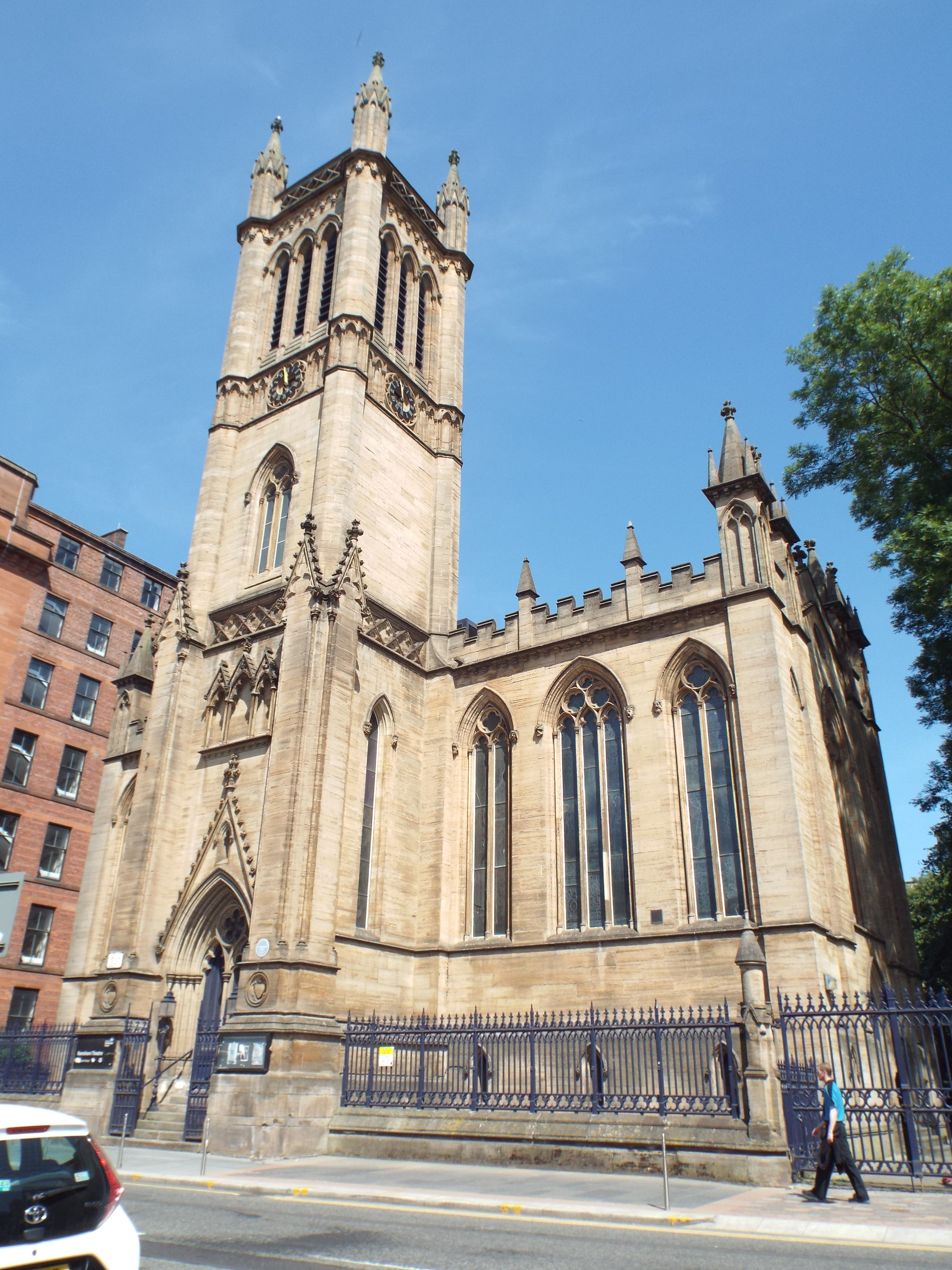
- The Ramshorn viewed from Ingram Street
- Interactive map of The Ramshorn
- Address: 98 Ingram Street, G1 1EX; Glasgow; Scotland
- Owner: University of Strathclyde
- Designation: University Department
- Current use: SCILT, Scotland’s National Centre for Languages and the Confucius Institute for Scotland’s Schools (CISS)

Construction
- Opened: 1824
- Rebuilt: 2019
- Architect: Thomas Rickman

Website
- scilt.org.uk

The Ramshorn (formerly St David's Parish Church), is a deconsecrated church building located on Ingram Street in the Merchant City area of Glasgow, Scotland. It is home to SCILT, Scotland's National Centre for Languages and the Confucius Institute for Scotland's Schools (CISS), both centres within the University of Strathclyde. The building is owned by the University, which bought the church in 1983 and used it as a theatre and performance space from 1992 until 2011.

The former church building sits within the Ramshorn Cemetery, one of Glasgow's oldest burial grounds.

== Architectural significance ==
The Ramshorn was originally built as St David's Parish Church in 1824, replacing a church that had stood on the site since 1720. Now a category A listed building, it was designed by English architect Thomas Rickman in the Gothic Revival style. This was the only Scottish church he designed.

Many of the stained-glass windows in the building are the work of W and J J Kier of Glasgow. They depict stories from the Old and New Testament.

== Historical significance ==
Known popularly as the Ramshorn Kirk, the church was in a wealthy and sought after area of Glasgow at the time. Prominent Glaswegians buried in the surrounding Ramshorn Cemetery, include industrialist David Dale, and tobacco merchants Andrew Buchanan and John Glassford.

Pierre Emile L'Angelier is also buried in the graveyard. He was the victim in the 1857 Madeleine Smith murder case.

The exterior of the building features a plaque to Sir John A MacDonald, the first prime minister of Canada, who was born in the parish, in addition to plaques to Professor John Anderson, natural philosopher and founder of the institution that would become the University of Strathclyde, and his grandfather John Anderson, who was minister at the Ramshorn Church.

== Current use ==
In 1982, the church's dwindling congregation merged with that of the nearby Barony Church on Castle Street. The University of Strathclyde bought the church in 1983 and commissioned Page/Park Architects to convert it into a theatre and performing arts space. It operated as a theatre and performance space from 1992 to 2011.

In May 2018, plans were submitted by the University of Strathclyde to Glasgow City Council to renovate the former theatre into offices and an exhibition area. The Ramshorn reopened in September 2019 as the home of SCILT, Scotland's National Centre for Languages and the Confucius Institute for Scotland's Schools (CISS), based within the Faculty of Humanities and Social Sciences at the University of Strathclyde.
