= Glassford Street =

Street in Glasgow, Scotland

Coordinates: 55°51′30.7″N 4°14′56.4″W

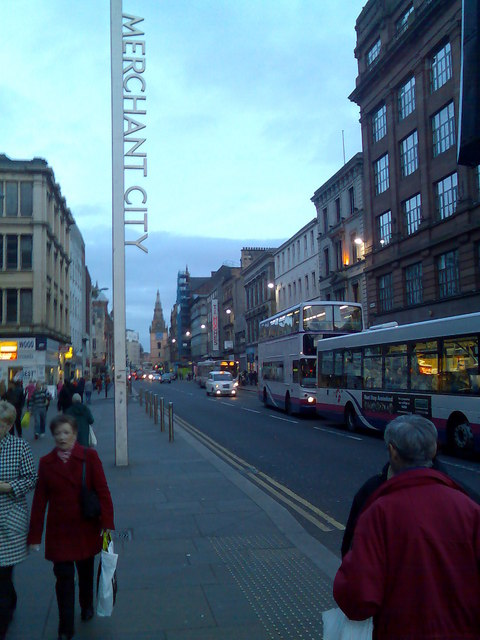
- Interactive map of Glassford Street
- Type: Commercial
- Maintained by: Glasgow City Council
- Length: 0.16 mi (0.26 km)
- Location: Glasgow
- Postal code: G1
- Nearest Glasgow Subway station: St. Enoch's

Glassford Street is a major thoroughfare in the city of Glasgow, the largest city in Scotland. The street runs north from the junction of Argyle Street and Trongate through the Merchant City until it meets Ingram Street.

== History ==
Originally this was on the grounds of house of John Glassford; a noted Tobacco Lord. The street was opened in 1793 and originally named Great Glassford Street. Glassford's house, known as the Shawfield Mansion, was removed in 1792 to build the street.

At the time of its opening the street now known as South Frederick Street, to the south of George Square, was known as Little Glassford Street; hence the original Great Glassford Street differentiation. Great Glassford Street was still being used in an advertisement of 1802.

As the new name of South Frederick Street became known instead of Little Glassford Street, there was no need for the differentiation of Great Glassford Street. The street simply became known as Glassford Street.

== Public transport ==
As a street which operates in two directions, unlike many in central Glasgow which are either one-way or fully pedestrianised, Glassford Street forms an important part of the city's taxi and bus corridor network.
