= David Dale =

Scottish merchant (1739–1806)

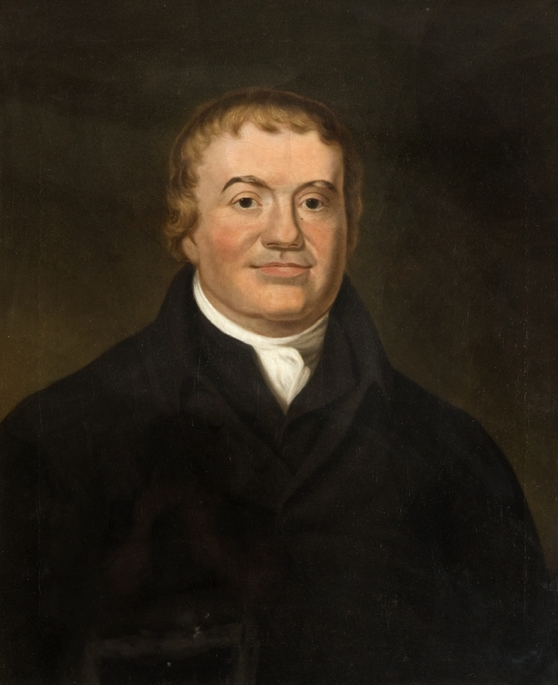
- David Dale c. 1800
- Born: 6 January 1739; Stewarton, Ayrshire, Scotland
- Died: 7 March 1806 (aged 67); Rosebank House, Cambuslang, Lanarkshire, Scotland
- Burial place: Ramshorn Cemetery, Glasgow
- Spouse: Anne Caroline Campbell (m. 1777, died)
- Children: 9
- Relatives: Robert Owen (son-in-law)

David Dale (6 January 1739 – 7 March 1806) was a Scottish industrialist, merchant and philanthropist during the Scottish Enlightenment period at the end of the 18th century. He was a successful entrepreneur in a number of areas, most notably in the cotton-spinning industry, and was the founder of the cotton mills in New Lanark, where he provided social and educational conditions in advance of anywhere else in Britain. New Lanark attracted visitors from all over the world. Robert Owen, who married Dale's daughter, Caroline, in 1799, used New Lanark to develop his theories about communitarian living, education and character formation. Scottish historian Tom Devine described Dale as "the greatest cotton magnate of his time in Scotland".

== Early career ==
Dale was born in Stewarton, Ayrshire on 6 January 1739, son of William Dale (1708–1796), a general dealer in the village, and Martha Dunlop (1719–1796). His date of birth is normally given as 6 January but there is no officially recorded date of birth. However, parish records show that he was baptised on 14 January 1739. As a child, he worked with the cattle as a 'herd laddie' in very basic conditions. This was the period of runrigs and impoverished tenant farmers. Dale's family was not wealthy, but he did not experience the absolute poverty and near starvation of many of those involved in tenant farming.

His father apprenticed him to a handloom weaver in Paisley and then he became an agent in Hamilton and, later, Cambuslang – putting out yarn to be woven and collecting the finished cloth. He arrived in Glasgow c. 1763 as a clerk to a silk merchant and began his own small business in the High Street, importing linen yarns from France and the Netherlands.

The business grew rapidly and Dale became a wealthy merchant in the city. In 1777, at the age of 38, he married 24-year-old Anne Caroline (Carolina) Campbell, whose late father had been the Chief Executive of the Royal Bank of Scotland. In 1783 Dale had his own mansion built in Glasgow's fashionable Charlotte Street. The couple were together for 14 years until the death of Carolina. During that period, they had nine children, four of whom, including their only son, died in infancy.

== Pivotal years ==
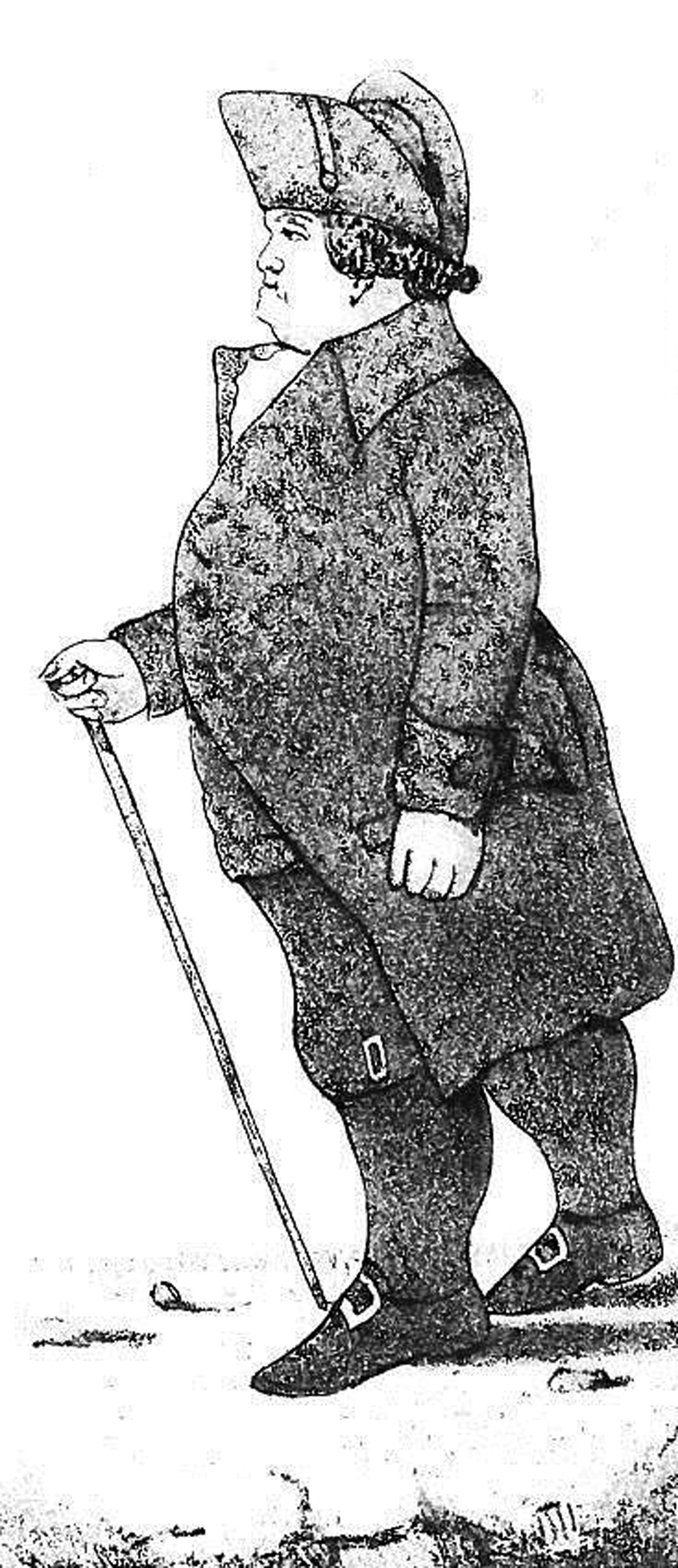
David Dale

The period 1783–1785 saw Dale's career take off in a number of directions. By 1785 he was no longer a city merchant but a budding entrepreneur, banker and industrialist.

In 1783 he joined Edinburgh businessman Robert Scott Moncrieff in setting up the first Glasgow agency of the Royal Bank of Scotland – a business arrangement possibly assisted by his wife's family connections. Within a few years, the Glasgow branch was doing business worth one million pounds. America was no longer a British colony and Glasgow merchants no longer depended on tobacco for their fortunes. Textiles, sugar and rum were the new tobacco. In 1783, there was an opportunity for Dale to extend his reputation and influence with the establishment of the Glasgow Chamber of Commerce, the first of its type in Britain. Dale became a director, later deputy chairman, and joined forces with the likes of James Oswald, James Dennistoun, John Glassford, Thomas Buchanan and many others – ex tobacco lords, sugar & rum merchants, textile merchants and entrepreneurs from the coal, chemical and brewing industries. Dale became an important figure in the commercial life of Glasgow and remained an influential figure in Chamber until his death.

According to one source, Dale by this time had become:

...the prosperous Glasgow merchant who, by virtue of pure force of character and intelligence, had fairly broken down that wall of distinction which once separated him from the great tobacco and sugar lords and could now wear his cocked hat jauntily, display his silver knee buckles showily and take the place of honour on the crown of the causeway with the proudest of them all.

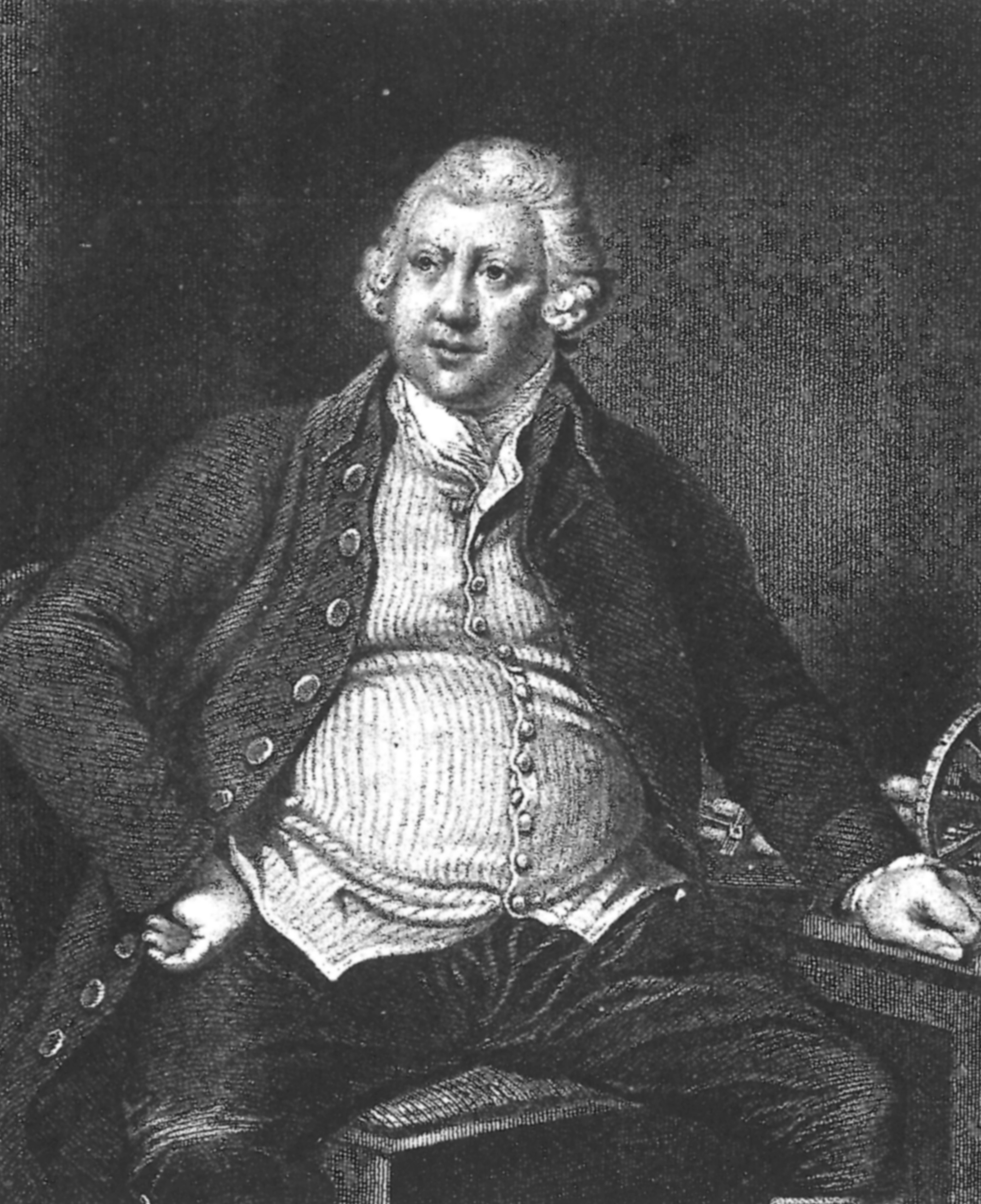
Portrait of Richard Arkwright.

== New Lanark ==
In 1784 Richard Arkwright visited Scotland at the request of George Dempster, landowner and Perthshire M.P. Arkwright, owner of the several successful cotton mills in England, acknowledged as the father of the cotton industry and one of the richest men in Britain, was persuaded to visit Lanark, with a view to establishing a cotton mill in the area.

Dale and Dempster accompanied Arkwright to where New Lanark is today. The site was considered to be suitable and a partnership was agreed between the three of them. Construction work began immediately and the mill buildings were based on Arkwright's own mills in Cromford. Men and boys were sent from New Lanark to Cromford for initial training and the mills began spinning in early 1786, at which point both Dempster and Arkwright left the partnership, leaving Dale as the sole owner. By the 1790s there were nearly 1,400 people living and working in the community. Business boomed and the village attracted thousands of visitors from all over the world. These included William and Dorothy Wordsworth, Samuel Coleridge and Robert Owen. They were attracted by a very successful spinning business, but New Lanark also became known as a model factory community where business, philanthropy and education all came together for the first time anywhere in Britain. The community became as famous for its social & educational provision as it did for anything else – something which Owen was later to capitalise upon.

== The apprentice children ==
Much of the focus was on Dale's treatment of his child employees – the so-called apprentice or pauper children. It was common practice for large numbers of children to be employed in mills and elsewhere from the age of 6 or 7 to age 15 or thereabouts. In New Lanark, village children worked alongside some 300 apprentice or pauper children from the charity workhouses in Glasgow and Edinburgh. They were often orphans, looked after by the parish, which was very keen to reduce costs by sending them out to work. The children were not paid but were given board & lodging in No.4 Mill. To begin with, they worked as reelers and pickers but later they worked at a range of jobs where they could learn skills which they could use when they left the mills. Some joined the army and navy; some became joiners or smiths and some were kept on in New Lanark. Employers like Dale were seen as charitable and benevolent because they offered the chance of employment, board and lodging and the acquisition of transferable skills.

The children worked from 6am until 7pm, with breaks for breakfast and dinner. They were given two sets of work clothes which were laundered regularly and a blue dress uniform for Sundays. Sleeping quarters were regularly cleaned and there is evidence to show that many of the pauper children enjoyed better conditions than some of the local children. Public Health campaigner, Dr James Currie was one of the many visitors. He noted that:

The utmost cleanliness, health and order pervaded the whole manufactory. The children looked cheerful and happy with rosy cheeks and chubby countenances, and I found a variety of excellent regulations established for health, morals and knowledge.

Much like Owen later on, Dale was convinced that a good education was essential for all involved. This was a new development in the evolution of factory communities. In England, owners like Arkwright offered Sunday schools but in New Lanark, there was a day school (every day) for under-sixes and an evening school (7-9pm) for older children. There was a formal curriculum which comprised the 3Rs, sewing, church music and religious study. At one stage, the school roll totalled more than 500 pupils and Dale was employing 16 trained teachers to teach more than eight classes. The pupils were grouped according to their ability and promoted to the next class after suitable tests. Teachers received a bonus for each pupil promoted.

All available evidence indicates that he provided conditions far superior to anything available in Britain at the time. Dale summed up his view of the practical effects of employing the children:

…when it is considered that the greater part of the children who are in the boarding house consists of destitute orphans, children abandoned by their parents... and many who know not who were their parents... it gives me great pleasure to say, that by proper management and attention, much good instead of evil may be done at cotton mills. For I am warranted in affirming that many now have stout, healthy bodies and are of decent behaviour who in all probability would have been languishing with disease and pests to society had they not been employed at Lanark cotton mills.

Owen visited New Lanark on a number of occasions and in 1799 he married Dale's daughter, Caroline. He and his partners bought New Lanark and Owen took over as sole manager on 1 January 1800. Over the next two decades Owen became famous for the improvements he made to the social conditions of his workforce, some of which were built on practices established by Dale. Several historians have commented that Owen exaggerated the problems that he found at New Lanark, downplaying Dale's innovations in order to boost the importance of his own, and have, to varying degrees, acknowledged the achievements of both men.

== Other business interests ==
Dale's business interests continued to expand. He had a house in New Lanark but the day-to-day management was left to William Kelly, a skilled engineer and manager. The main offices of the business were in St Andrew's Square, Glasgow and Dale continued to live in Charlotte Street in the city. Later in life he added a country house, Rosebank, in Cambuslang, to his properties. He divided his time between New Lanark, the Royal Bank and the offices in St Andrews Square.

He was involved in a number of other cotton mills. Not long after spinning began in New Lanark, Dale built a new mill in Blantyre and a school for the apprentices. He sold the venture to James Monteith in 1792. In 1788, Dale went into partnership with Claud Alexander of Ballochmyle (former Paymaster for the East India Company) in a spinning mill in Catrine in Ayrshire. Dale was heavily involved in the design of these mills and within a few years, some 1,300 people were employed. Once again there were apprentice (but no pauper) children and a proper school was provided. He remained involved with the business until 1801 when the mills were sold to James Finlay. In partnership with a number of others, he opened a small mill in Spinningdale in Sutherland. This was more a charitable effort than anything else. The aim was to provide work and relieve famine, distress in the area and also to stem the tide of emigration from the Highlands. Dale remained involved long after all the others had left and continued to finance it until two years before his death. The mill burned down a year later.

In Glasgow, Dale's business profile continued to grow. In Dalmarnock he set up a dyeworks where cloth was dyed with a new, colourfast dye called 'Turkey Red' (sometimes known in the city as 'Dale's Red'). In the centre of town, in what is now Ingram Street, he built a warehouse and small manufactory which produced linen strips or tapes known as 'incles' or Scotch Tape. The company traded under the name Dale, Campbell, Reid & Dale, the second Dale being his nephew, David Dale Junior. Still in Glasgow, Dale invested in the insurance business. He became a director of the Glasgow Fire Insurance Company, which sold life insurance and annuities and had offices in George Street and Wilson Street. Dale also owned a significant amount of property in and around the city, including lands and tenements in the Ramshorn (Ingram Street) area, Shuttle Street, Barrowfield, Ruchill and Parkhead.

== Philanthropy and civic duty ==
Dale was also a director or manager of various charitable projects throughout the city, and newspaper reports of the time talk of his charity, his kindness, his benevolence and his good deeds and public works. Much of this was inspired by his religious belief. He was a strongly evangelical Christian, a pastor in the Dissenting (Secessionist) Church, preaching on Sundays in meeting houses all over the city. He stated in one of his sermons:

Riches are one great object. These frequently take to themselves wings and flyaway... they profit not in the day of wrath. And if these are obtained by oppressing the poor, or withholding from the needy what his wants demand from us, the consequence is awful... your riches are corrupted.

He donated to small charitable ventures on a regular basis. These included the Howard Fund for prison reform, an injured servicemen's charity, the Royal Northern Infirmary in Inverness, Perth Academy and the newly formed Glasgow Humane Society, where he agreed to become a director and undertake fundraising on their behalf. He was better known for some of his more public philanthropy and civic duties. He served as a Bailie and Magistrate in the city for two years, something which he found particularly time-consuming and onerous. Nevertheless, he earned a reputation in the press for his relatively lenient approach and became known as 'The Benevolent Magistrate'. When a new road was required between Clydesdale and England, he gave £700 towards the cost. On several occasions he helped to feed those in need. For example, he provided meal to the poor in Stewarton at below cost price and he sent a ship to the U.S. to bring back grain which he distributed to the poor in Glasgow.

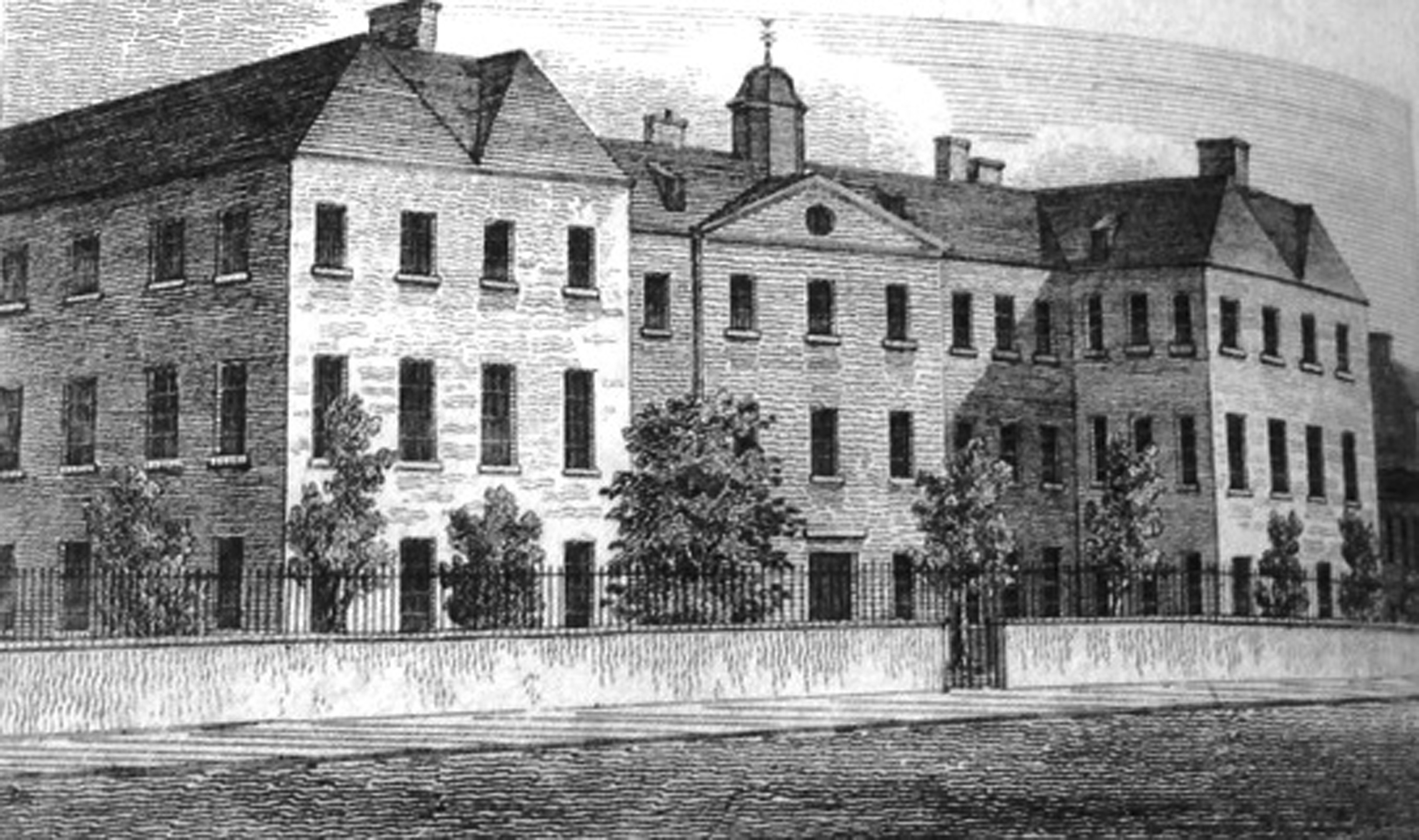
Town's Hospital, Glasgow.

For twenty years he was a director of the Town's Hospital, the equivalent of a charity workhouse for the poor, orphans, elderly, sick and, until 1814, the mentally ill, serving on the institution's Manufacturing Committee.

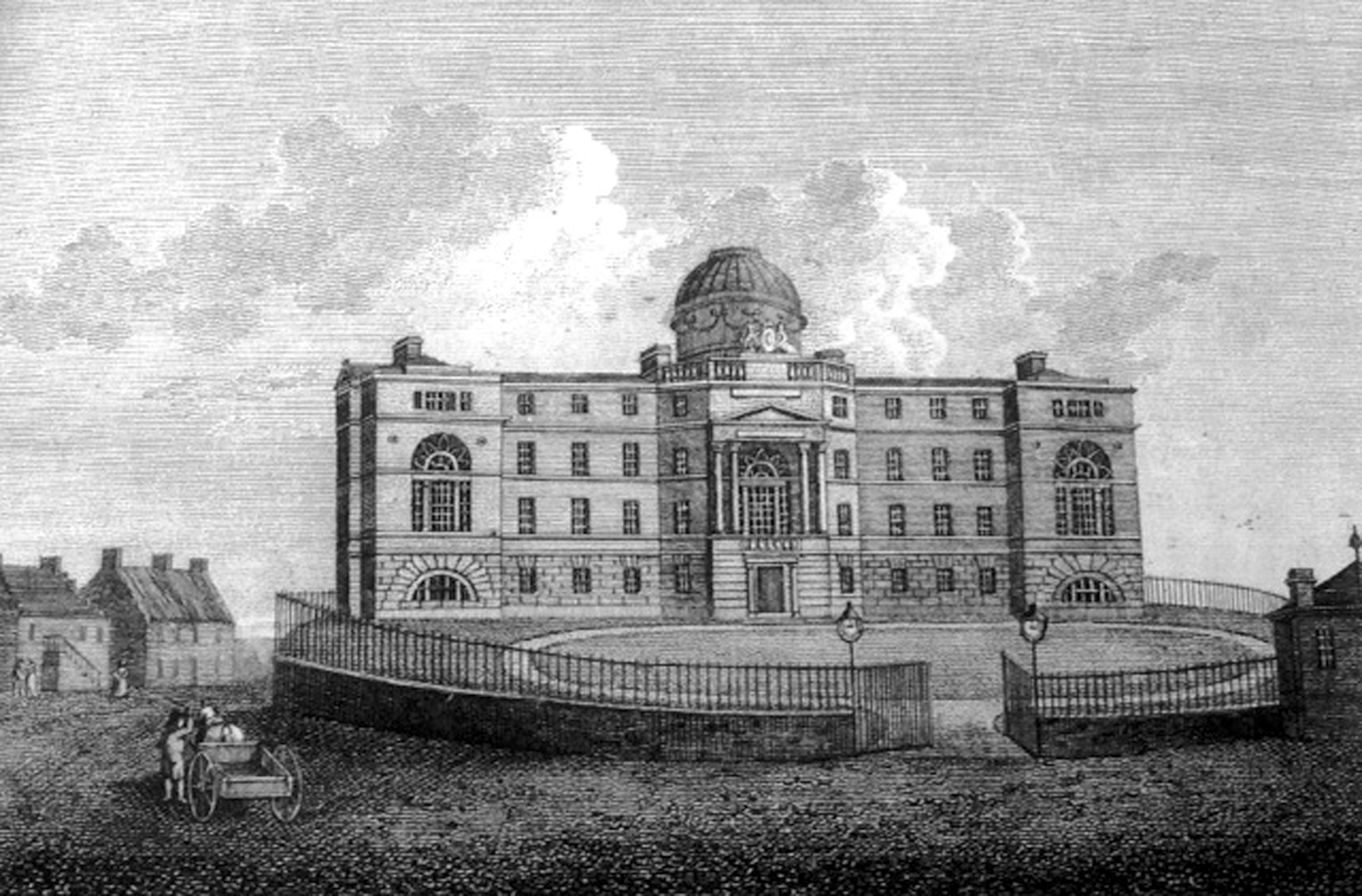
Glasgow Royal Infirmary, c1812.

Dale was also involved with Glasgow Royal Infirmary. The Infirmary was intended '...for the reception of indigent persons under bodily distress in the west of Scotland'. Dale was involved in this project from its very beginning in 1788. He chaired the group which raised the funds, found the land and supervised the building work of this major city institution. He subscribed £200 and when the building finally opened in 1795, he was appointed as a manager, spending the rest of his life as a manager or director. He stood to gain nothing personally from this commitment. The Infirmary was for the poor. However, as a manager and annual subscriber, he had the right to refer a number of his workers from New Lanark and between 1795 and 1803 he personally referred some 64 patients.

== Dale's views on slavery ==
The raw cotton used in Dale's cotton mills came from three principal sources, the United States, South America and the West Indies, and were produced in those regions via slave labour. However, by the late 18th century, attitudes to slavery were beginning to change and the fledgling British abolitionist movement was rapidly gaining pace. The abolitionist movement in Britain was led by Thomas Clarkson and William Wilberforce, who oversaw the actions of the London Society, which sent representatives across the country seeking support for anti-slavery petitions. The Glasgow Society for the Abolition of the Slave Trade was set up in January 1791, with Dale as the chairman. In the same year, he bought shares in the newly formed Sierra Leone Company which sought to establish a colony of freed slaves in West Africa.

The Glasgow group publicised the London Society's pamphlet, with a Preface about the new Glasgow Society. There were various meetings throughout 1791, all chaired by Dale, and the Society sent 100 guineas to the London campaign offices. The following year, it met on a number of occasions in support of the various public petitions which were being drawn up in all the cities and towns in Scotland. At a General Meeting of the Glasgow Society on 1 February 1792, with Dale in the Chair, the members resolved;

…that the traffic in the human species is founded on the grossest injustice, is attended with the utmost cruelty and barbarity to an innocent race of men and is productive of ruin and desolation of a country which the efforts of the well-directed industry of Great Britain might contribute to civilise.

On Commerce and the Enlightenment it said:

[the slave trade]…is directly repugnant to the primary laws of nature…and that its continuance, in this enlightened age, is disgraceful to the nation and utterly inconsistant (sic) with the profession of Christians.

== Death ==
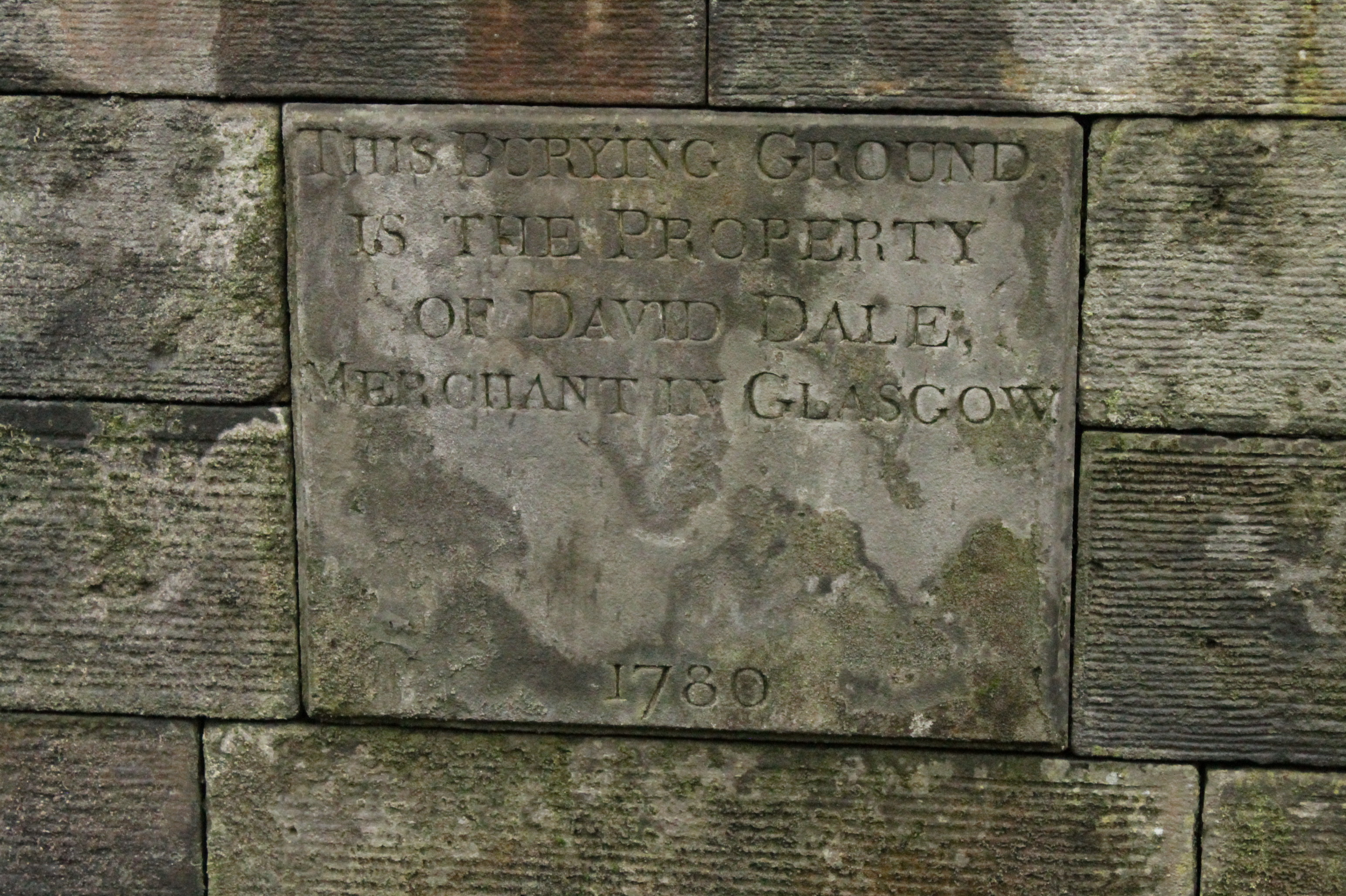
The grave of David Dale, Ramshorn Cemetery

When Dale died at his home, Rosebank House in Cambuslang, Lanarkshire on 7 March 1806, huge crowds of mourners lined the streets of Glasgow. He was buried in the Ramshorn Cemetery in central Glasgow in a plot he had purchased some years before. The grave lies on the outer east wall towards the north-east corner.

The Glasgow Herald's obituary of Dale acknowledged his achievements as a businessman, and noted that:

…his ear was never shut to the cry of distress; his private charities were boundless; and every public institution which had for its object the alleviation or prevention of human misery, in this world or in the world to come, received from him the most liberal support and encouragement.

== Bibliography ==
Modern publications on Dale:

- McLaren, D. J. (2015). David Dale: A Life. Stenlake Publishing Ltd.

Modern publications on Owen:

- Claeys, G. (ed)(1993) The Selected Works of Robert Owen. Pickering & Chato.
- Davis, R. & O’Hagan, F. (2014) Robert Owen. Bloomsbury.
- Donnachie, I. & Hewitt, G. (2015) Historic New Lanark. 2nd edition. E.U.P.
- Donnachie, I. (2005). Robert Owen, Social Visionary. 2nd edition. Birlinn.

Historical publications:

- Baines, E. (1835) History of the Cotton Manufacture in Great Britain. London: Fisher.
- Black, W.G. (1912) ‘David Dale’s House in Charlotte Street’, Transactions of the Regality Club (1889-1912), 4 vols. Vol 4 (1912):93-121. Glasgow: James Maclehose & Sons.
- Liddell, A. (1854) Memoir of David Dale. Blackie.
- Owen, R. (1857). Life of Robert Owen by Himself .Effingham Wilson.
- Podmore, F. (1906) Robert Owen – A Biography. Hutchinson & Co.
