= Old Ship Bank =

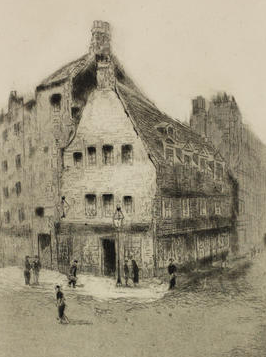
- The Old Ship Bank in Glasgow
- Formerly: Ship Bank
- Type: Bank
- Industry: Financial services
- Founded: 1750
- Founder: Andrew Buchanan of Drumpellier and other "Virginia Dons"
- Defunct: 1843
- Fate: Merged
- Successor: Union Bank of Scotland
- Headquarters: Glasgow, Scotland

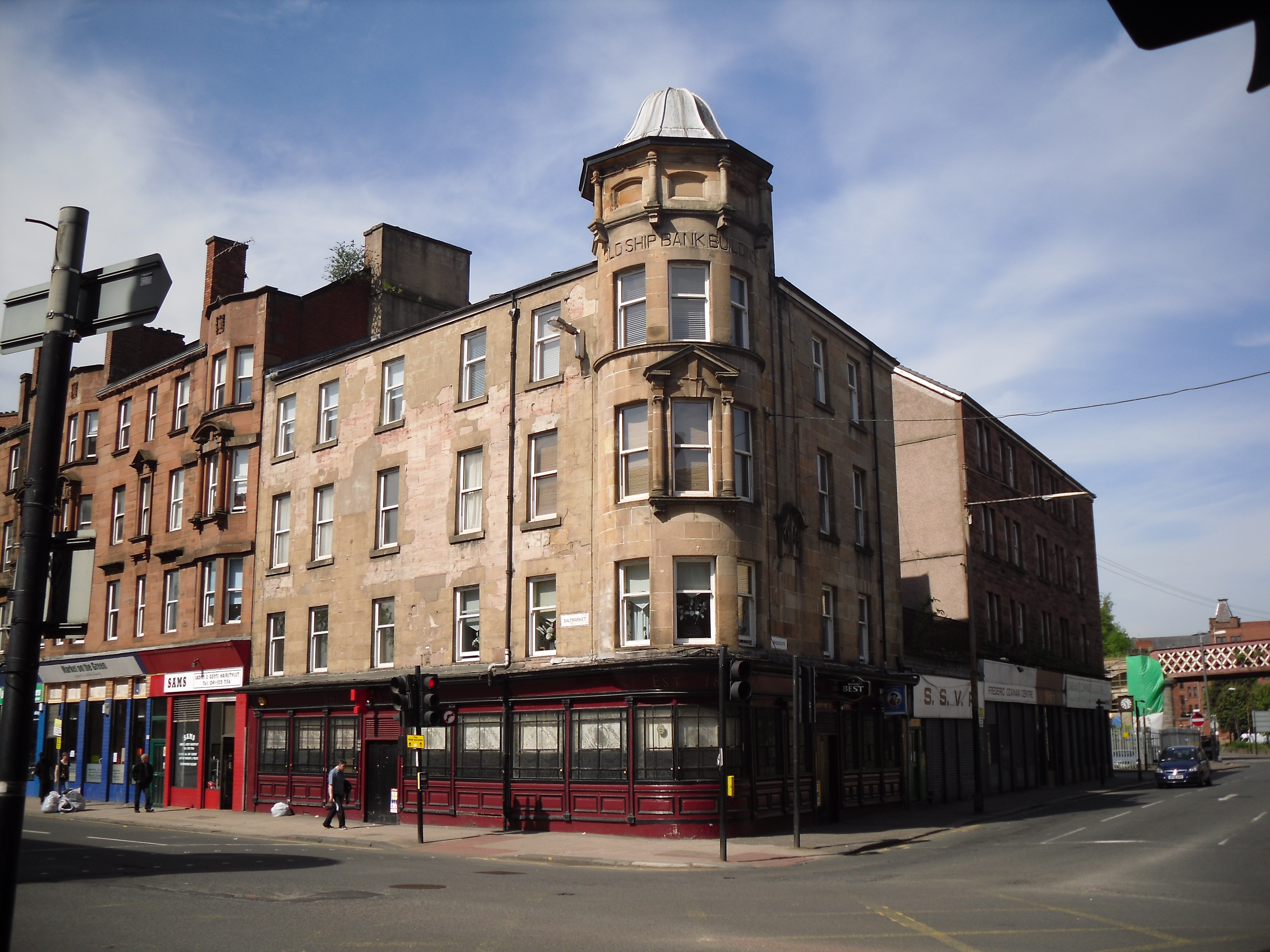
The Old Ship Bank public house, today

The Ship Bank or more usually Old Ship Bank was an independent bank formed in Glasgow in 1750 becoming Glasgow's first bank. The bank was merged in 1836 and in 1843 the name disappeared altogether, simply becoming the Union Bank of Scotland.

== History ==
The bank was created in 1750 by Andrew Buchanan of Drumpellier and other "Virginia Dons": Glasgow Tobacco Lords of the mid-18th century. It underwent several changes in ownership. It was originally owned by Dunlop, Houston & Co. The building stood on a prominent corner in the city, at the junction of Saltmarket and Bridgegate. Houston and Dunlop were Alexander Houston and John Murdoch of Rosebank (or his father Peter Murdoch of Rosehill).

Its early staff is unclear but in 1752 Robert Carrick arrived as a trainee banker. His position was obtained through his father being a friend of Buchanan.

Carrick became manager ("Cashier") of the bank in 1775, which by then was owned by Moores Carrick & Co. By this stage Carrick owned the entire building, and lived in a small attic room of the building to save personal expense.

In 1776 it decanted many of its functions to the old Shawfield mansion on Argyle street/Trongate on the site where modern day Glassford Street starts. In 1787 their main premises was on Argyle Street.

In 1793 when the financial world was in ruin, and three Glasgow banks failed, the Ship Bank held strong. Carrick died in 1821 with a personal worth of over £1 million: three times the assets of the bank itself. A highly unloved man he now lies in an unmarked grave in the Ramshorn Cemetery. His death also marked the beginning of the slow demise of the Ship Bank.

In 1825 the bank rebuilt the Shawfield premises on Glassford Street replacing it with a building designed by David Hamilton. The former premises ceased to be a bank, and was thereafter known as the "Old Ship Bank". The new building was demolished in the 1960s to create Marks & Spencer Department Store.

In 1836 the bank merged with the Glasgow Bank Company (est. 1809) to create the Glasgow and Ship Bank. The then manager of the Ship Bank, Michael Rowand, retired at the point of amalgamation. The merged company retained their former premises on Ingram Street as their headquarters. They had a value of £600,000 at the time of the merge.

In a merge of 1843 the name disappeared altogether, simply becoming the Union Bank of Scotland which disappeared in 1955 when it merged with the Bank of Scotland.

The original 1750 building was rebuilt in 1904. It retained the ground floor public house "The Old Ship Bank" which still survives to this day.
