= Archibald Ingram =

Scottish tobacco trader

Archibald Ingram (1699–1770) was an 18th-century tobacco lord who served as Lord Provost of Glasgow from 1762 to 1764. Ingram Street in the city centre was named in his honour in 1781.

== Life ==
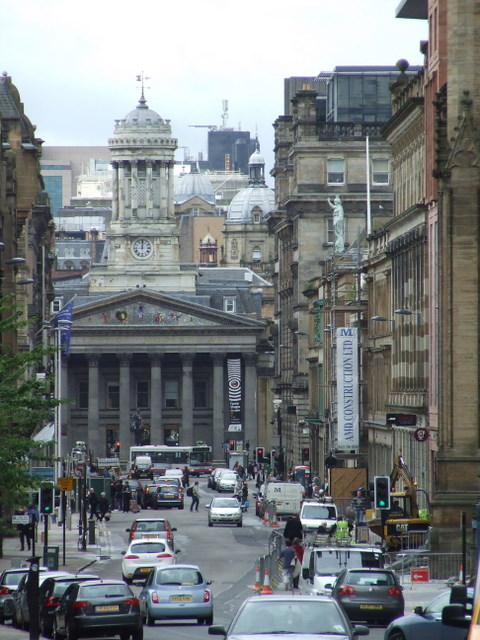
Ingram Street in Glasgow, named after Archibald Ingram

He was born in or near Glasgow in 1699.

He began trading in tobacco around 1720 and (as was common) began his own plantations.

In 1742 he gained a younger partner, his brother-in-law John Glassford, and in 1750 they created Ingram & Glassford, a powerful trading company. They made their fortune as Tobacco Lords, with plantations in the east coast of America.

He was involved in the creation of the Glasgow Arms Bank and the Pollokshaws Calico Printing Company and the Inkle Company. He was described as the father of the calico printing industry in Scotland, specifically created as a "return product" for the ship returning to America for more tobacco.

From 1752 he was the financial backer of the Foulis Academy created by the printers Andrew Foulis and Robert Foulis. The Academy was created on the High Street in an upper room owned by the Glasgow College.

In 1757 he sold 3 acres of land at Gallowmuir to the Town council for £1695 (Scots).

Prior to being elected Lord Provost in 1762 he was Dean of Guild to the city from 1757.

He died in Glasgow in 1770. He is thought to be buried in the Ramshorn Cemetery (near Ingram Street). As he died before the American Revolution of 1776 he avoided the financial ruin which befell most of his peers.

Without his financial support the Foulis Academy failed in 1774.
