= James Buchanan of Drumpellier =

Scottish tobacco trader

James Buchanan of Drumpellier (1726–1786) was an 18th-century tobacco merchant who twice served as Lord Provost of Glasgow from 1768 to 1770 and 1774 to 1776.

== Life ==
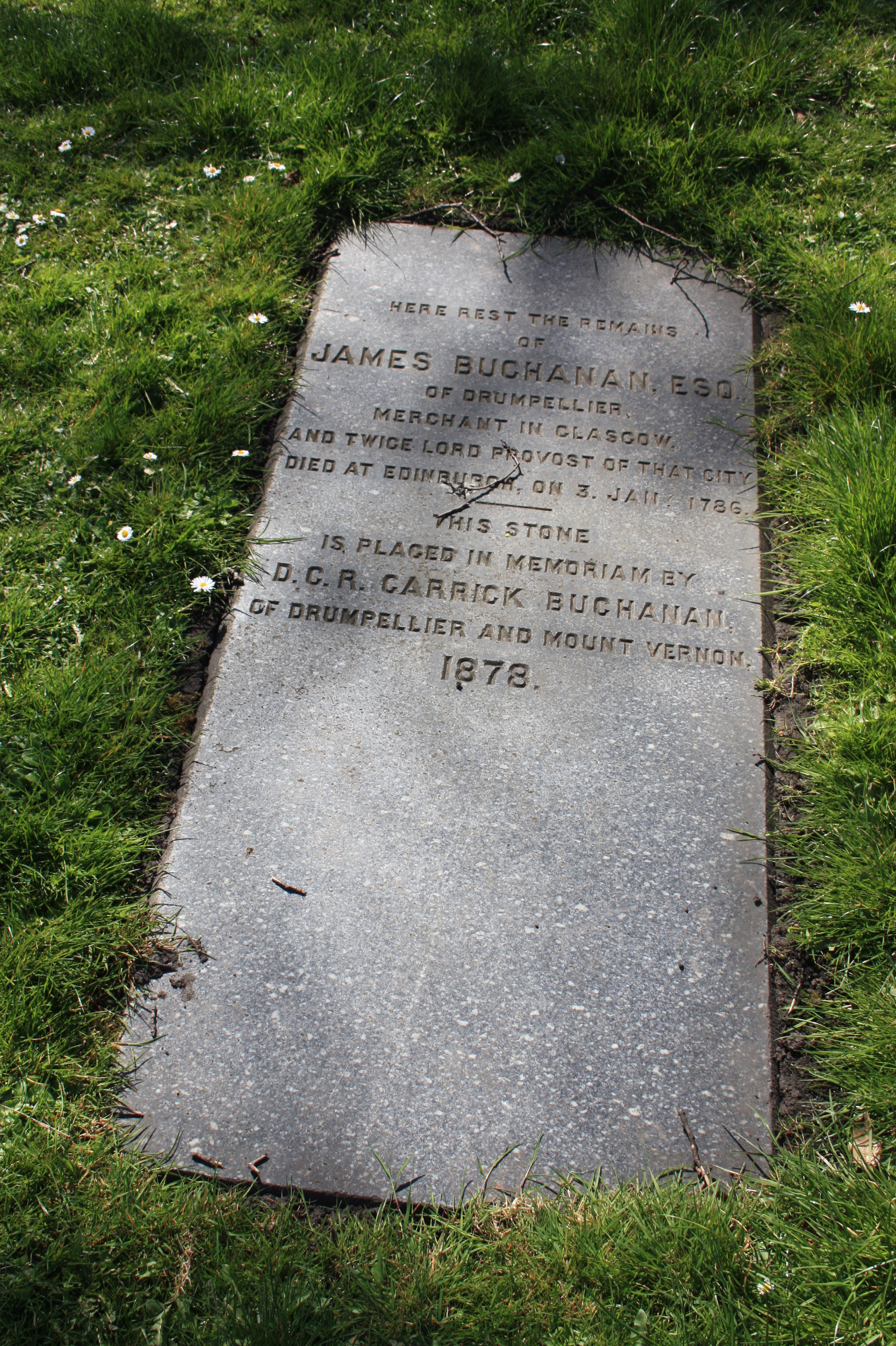
The grave of James Buchanan of Drumpellier, Greyfriars Kirkyard

He was born at Long Croft in Glasgow (now known as Virginia Street) in 1726 the son of Andrew Buchanan of Drumpellier and his wife Marion Montgomery. When James was a teenager his father served as Lord Provost of Glasgow.

Although he inherited his father's tobacco plantations and estates, including Drumpellier on his father's death in 1759, he was ruined in 1777 following the American Revolution. He sold the bulk of his estates to his cousin, Andrew Stirling (of William Stirling & Sons). The estate was reacquired by James' nephew, David Buchanan in 1808 (later known as David Buchanan Carrick).

In 1777 Buchanan Street in Glasgow was started to be built on lands he inherited from his father, and is named after his family.

Around 1780 he seems to have relocated to Edinburgh. He is listed as a commissioner (probably working for the Excise in Leith Docks) and living in one of the larger houses on Leith Walk.

He died in Edinburgh on 3 January 1786. He is buried at Greyfriars Kirkyard. The grave lies at the extreme north end near the Trotter mausoleum. Due to restrictions on stones in Greyfriars, a slab was only placed in 1878 (by his grandson Carrick Buchanan).

== Family ==
He was married to Margaret Hamilton, granddaughter of Thomas Hamilton, 6th Earl of Haddington.

Their only child, Helen Buchanan, married Vice Admiral Sir George Home of Blackadder, 7th Baronet.
