= History of Coatbridge =

The history of Coatbridge, Scotland, is one of dramatic change. The town transformed from an obscure group of 18th century Lanarkshire hamlets strung out on the road between Glasgow and Airdrie to a world leading centre of iron production in the 19th century. Development took off at an incredible rate in the 19th century and led to massive changes to the landscape and an explosion in the population.

Though Coatbridge is a most interesting seat of industry, it is anything but beautiful. Dense clouds of smoke roll over it incessantly, and impart to all the buildings a peculiarly dingy aspect. A coat of black dust overlies everything, and in a few hours the visitor finds his complexion considerably deteriorated by the flakes of soot which fill the air, and settle on his face. To experience Coatbridge it must be visited at night when it presents a most extraordinary spectacle.... From the steeple of the parish church the flames of no fewer than fifty blast furnaces may be seen.... The flames have a positively fascinating effect. Now they shoot far upward, and breaking off short, expire among the smoke; again spreading outward, they curl over the lips of the furnace, and dart through the doorways, as if determined to annihilate the bounds within which they are confined; then they sink low into the crater, and come forth with renewed strength in the shape of great tongues of fire, which sway backward and forward, as if seeking with a fierce eagerness something to devour. The Scotsman, 1869

== Early history ==
The earliest evidence of human habitation in the Coatbridge area can be traced back a crannog in Drumpellier Loch (as it is known locally but persistently referred to as Lochend Loch on every map known), part of Drumpellier Country Park. A crannog was an Iron Age dwelling house built on an artificial island. People continued to live in Crannogs up until about AD 1450.

A Bronze Age cemetery has been found on the stretch of land between Drumpellier and Bargeddie. There are thought to be the remains of a Roman road on the fringes of the town at the site of the modern day M8 motorway. Roman coins have been unearthed in Coatbridge. The main Celtic tribes in the Lanarkshire environs during Roman times were named the Damnonii and Selgovae by the Romans.

== Middle Ages ==
Gillpatrice Mackerran owned the area of Coatbridge prior to the Newbattle abbey Monklands being granted the land. In 1160, parts of the Caledonian Forest still remained in the area. The “Monklands” area was so called because it was granted to the monks of Newbattle Abbey in 1162. The monks were the first to mine coal in the area. In the 15th century, a visiting dignitary witnessed "black stones" being distributed to the poor as alms. In the 16th century these stones had become known as "black gold". The monks cleared part of the forest which covered the area at the time. They cultivated the land extensively and by the 16th century had leased most of the lands to farmers. Many of the local place names are descended from those used by the monks, such as Whifflet (from 'wheat flats') and Ryefield. The local tracks established by the monks were used as part of the main road between Edinburgh and Glasgow until the early 19th century The town was on the stage coach route between the two cities

In 1602, Sir Thomas Hamilton of Binning took possession. The Clellands of Monklands subsequently took possession in 1633. A few years later, in 1639, James, Marquis of Hamilton, was the owner. Monklands subsequently passed into the hands of the College of Glasgow after being bought from Anne, Duchess of Hamilton in the reign of.

In 1641, the parish of Monklands was divided between New Monkland (present day Airdrie) and Old Monkland (present day Coatbridge). Drumpellier was called the 'Grange' in a charter of Alexander II in 1240. In 1745, Bonnie Prince Charlie's Jacobite army supposedly seized Coatbridge on their march to Edinburgh, in an action described as the 'Canter of Coatbridge'. This has been proved to be an error: the true story is 'The Canter of Coltsbridge' (a suburb in the West of Edinburgh).

== Industrial Coatbridge ==
By the time of the late 18th century Coatbridge was only a collection of hamlets between Glasgow and Airdrie. However, the construction of the Monkland Canal to transport coal from deposits in Coatbridge to Glasgow proved to be the spark which set fire to the town's population explosion. The invention of the hot blast furnace in 1828 by James Beaumont Neilson meant that Coatbridge's rich ironstone deposits could be fully exploited by the canal link. By the mid-19th century there were numerous hot blast furnaces in operation in Coatbridge.

In this period fortunes could be quickly made “with a rapidity only equalled by the princely gains of some of the adventurers who accompanied Pizarro to Peru”, noted one observer. Amongst the most notable success stories at this time were the six sons of Coatbridge farmer Alexander Baird. The Bairds were a local farming family in the late 18th century. They became buccaneering capitalists when they leased a coalfield near Coatdyke. They then moved into iron production in the late 1820s. Ruthlessly exploiting James Beaumont Neilson's invention of the furnace process to produce iron they were forced to pay substantial damages in a court action. It was reported that upon losing the court action they were able to simply write a cheque. They had used the patent without paying any royalties. After a nine-day trial they were forced to pay out around ten thousand pounds. It was estimated though they had however realised a profit of £250,000 by exploitation of the patent. The Baird family owned a number of the foundries that sprung up and gave the town its then nickname of 'the Iron Burgh'. Each of the sons was reputed to have become a millionaire. James Baird was responsible for erecting sixteen blast-furnaces in Coatbridge between 1830 and 1842. George "Squire Abingdon" Baird was a direct descendant of the Baird's.

The Baird family exerted a strong influence over Coatbridge in the 19th century. The Bairds were responsible for the lay out of present-day central Coatbridge town centre and gave the town land for the town hall and the land which later came to form Dunbeth Park. Gartsherrie church was built by the Baird family for them and their employees.

At one stage the population of Coatbridge grew by 600%. Cheap unskilled labour was in large demand and Coatbridge became a popular destination for vast numbers of largely unskilled Irish workers arriving in Scotland.

There have been centuries of coal workings across the area. In 1791, there was disaster at Coats Pit when the canal burst and six miners were drowned. A large part of modern-day Coatbridge has been undermined by underground coal workings. The modern day car parks skirting both sides of the South Circular Road are so undermined that no sizable buildings can be built. Dick's Pond in Carnbroe (labelled Orchard Farm Pool by Google Maps but never called that locally) consists of the hollow left by an ironstone working.

The Clyde Valley plan of 1949 described Coatbridge as "situated over a flooded coalfield" Tenements in Coatbridge were not built to same height as Glasgow tenements, due to danger of subsidence

There were serious cholera outbreaks in the town in 1832 and 1848. Population growth strained every natural resource in the town and the canal's stagnant waters were a breeding ground for disease. Andrew Miller noted that locals used the canal water for drinking and in times of dry weather even used the muddy dregs found at the bottom of the Monkland Canal. (In later years, during the 20th century, it was noted that the residents of Gartcosh did not suffer such problems, but that was attributed to the largely English immigrant population who preferred to drink beer rather than water!)

In 1885, Coatbridge was granted burgh status. Local industrialists had put off burgh status to avoid falling foul of air pollution legislation. Special provisions were made in the burgh bill to allow the blast furnaces to continue polluting undisturbed.

Irish people began to come to arrive Coatbridge in the mid-19th century, many of them because of The Great Hunger in the mid-19th century. The 1851 census recorded that Irish people born in Coatbridge constituted 35.8% of the population. Although while a significant proportion of these emigrants were Protestant the majority were Catholic. Serious sectarian strife arose in Coatbridge throughout the 19th century. The New York Times reported on serious "riots" between local Catholics and Orangemen during 1883. Orangeism in Coatbridge (then 60% Catholic) was said to have inflated the local Conservative and Unionist vote and representation on the council.

== 20th & 21st century ==
By 1901, the percentage of Irish born people in Coatbridge had fallen to around 15%, but remained the highest of all the major towns in Scotland.

By end of World War I only five ironworks were left in Coatbridge – Langloan, Calder, Carnbroe, Summerlee and Gartsherrie. Four of the ironworks were closed by the time of 1929. In 1934 there was a mass exodus to Corby, England when the Union Plant relocated. This had the effect of a hammer blow impact on the town's iron industry and ushered in the end of serious iron production. The decline of Clydeside shipbuilding in the 1950s meant the demand for iron finally collapsed.

In the 1920s-1930s Coatbridge Town Council constructed new housing estates at Cliftonville, Cliftonhall, Rosehall, Barrowfield and Espieside. As late as 1936 however Coatbridge was the most overcrowded place in Scotland. After World War II Townhead, Kirkwood, Kirkshaws, Shawhead, Summerlee and Sikeside followed. The high rises which can be seen on the present day Coatbridge skyline were constructed in this same period.

As recently as 1961 the birth rate in Coatbridge was a third higher than the Scottish average.

Since the 1970s there have been various initiatives to attempt to regenerate Coatbridge. Urban Aid, European Union grants and most recently Social Inclusion Partnerships have attempted to breathe new life into Coatbridge. In the 1970s the Tannoy company relocated their headquarters to Coatbridge.
