= James Glassford =

Scottish legal writer and traveller

James Glassford (1771 – 1845) was a Scottish legal writer and traveller.

== Life ==
He was son of John Glassford of Dougalston by his third wife, Lady Margaret Mackenzie, sixth daughter of George Mackenzie, 3rd Earl of Cromartie. Glassford was admitted a member of the Faculty of Advocates in 1793, and became sheriff-depute of Dunbartonshire. He succeeded to Dougalston on the death of his elder brother Henry in 1819.

Glassford was one of the commissioners of the Royal Commission of inquiry into the state of education in Ireland, and in that capacity visited Ulster, Leinster, and Munster in 1824, and Connacht in 1826. He also acted as one of the commissioners appointed (1815) for inquiring into the duties and emoluments of the clerks and other officers of the courts of justice in Scotland. He died at Edinburgh on 28 July 1845.

== Works ==
Glassford published:

- Remarks on the Constitution and Procedure of the Scottish Courts of Law, Edinburgh, 1812.
- An Essay on the Principles of Evidence, and their application to subjects of Judicial Enquiry, Edinburgh, 1812.
- Exemplum Tractatus de fontibus Juris, and other Latin Pieces of Lord Bacon. Translated by James Glassford, Esq., Advocate, Edinburgh, 1823.
- Frondes Caducæ, Chiswick, 1824.
- Letter to the Right Hon. Sir John Newport, Bart., M.P., on the subject of the Fees payable in the Courts of Justice and the Stamp Duties on Law Proceedings, London, 1824. To Sir John Newport, 1st Baronet.
- Letter to the Right Hon. the Earl of Roden on the present state of Popular Education in Ireland, London, 1829.
- Lyrical Compositions selected from the Italian Poets, with translations, Edinburgh, 1834. A second edition was published in 1846 after the author's death, greatly enlarged. Several of these translations were republished in London in 1886 in a volume of the Canterbury Poets, entitled Sonnets of Europe, edited by Samuel Waddington.
- Notes of Three Tours in Ireland in 1824 and 1826, Bristol, 1838. This work was printed for private distribution in 1831.
- Letter by the Chancellor D'Aguesseau to a Friend on the subject of the Christian Mysteries, by James Glassford, Esq., and extracted by permission from the Scottish "Christian Herald". This letter was published in Unitarianism tried by Scripture and Experience, … with a General Introduction by a Layman, London, 1840.
- Miscellanea, Edinburgh, pp. 83. This volume, printed at Edinburgh for private circulation, contained translations of Joseph Addison's Machinæ Gesticulantes, and Philip Froude's Cursus Glaciales.

Glassford also published Elegiæ, no place or date (pp. 31; another edition, pp. 39).
