= William Cochran (artist) =

Scottish painter (1738–1785)

- Born: 12 December 1738; Strathaven, Scotland
- Died: 23 October 1785 (aged 46); Glasgow, Scotland

William Cochran (12 December 1738– 23 October 1785) was a Scottish painter.

== Life ==
His father was John Cochran (30 October 1715 - 1795) from Strathaven, South Lanarkshire.

His mother was Mary McGalliard (1720 - 12 February 1794).

William Cochran was born on 12 December 1738 in Strathaven.

He married Margaret Wilson (born 9 April 1738) on 1 December 1758 in Strathaven.

== Art ==
Cochran received his first instruction at the Academy of Painting at Glasgow, founded by the two celebrated printers, Robert and Andrew Foulis. About 1761 he went to Italy and studied under Gavin Hamilton, and on his return to Glasgow about 1766 he practised portrait painting both in oil and miniature. Some pieces from fable, executed by him when at Rome, are to be found in Glasgow. He was a modest artist, and never exhibited his works, nor put his name to them.

== Death ==
He died at Glasgow 23 October 1785. and was buried in the cathedral, where a monument was erected to his memory.
