= Glasgow and Ship Bank =

The Glasgow and Ship Bank was created in 1836 from the merger of the Ship Bank and the Glasgow Banking Company.

The Glasgow and Ship Bank was formed as a private bank. In 1843, the partners accepted an offer from the Union Bank of Scotland to buy the business.
