= Ingram Street =

Street in Glasgow, Scotland

Coordinates: 55.85959°N 4.24618°W

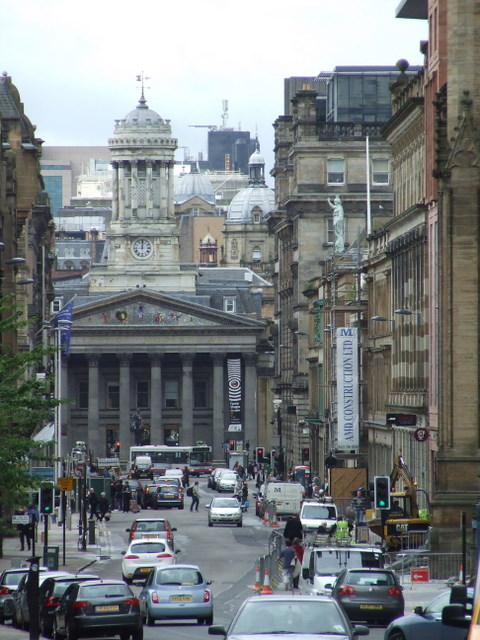
Looking west along Ingram Street towards the Gallery of Modern Art.

Ingram Street is a major thoroughfare in the city of Glasgow, the largest city in Scotland. The street runs east from Queen Street through the Merchant City until it meets High Street.

== History ==
The street was formerly known as Back Cow Lone. Lone or Loan being an old Scots word for a cattle track or lane, which then also became used as a street name.

== Re-naming of the street ==
Back Cow Lone was renamed to Ingram Street in 1781. The street was renamed in honour of Archibald Ingram, a Tobacco Lord, who became Lord Provost of Glasgow in the 1760s.

== Landmarks ==
At the western end of the street at the junction with Queen Street is the Gallery of Modern Art in Royal Exchange Square. There are several local landmarks on Ingram Street itself, such as the Italian Centre, the old Sheriff Court, Ramshorn Theatre, the Hutchesons' Hall and the Corinthian club amongst others. Ingram Street has, in recent years, become a haven for upmarket retailers such as Polo Ralph Lauren, who operate a store on Ingram Street. United Colors of Benetton, Mulberry, GANT, Crombie, Bose and Jigsaw among others also have stores on the street, with Brora expected to open in September 2017. Pretty Green opened their first permanent store on Ingram Street after the success of their pop-up store.

== Public transport ==
As a street which operates in two directions, unlike many in central Glasgow which are either one-way or fully pedestrianised, Ingram Street forms an important part of the city's taxi and bus corridor network.

== Controversy ==
Many of the Tobacco Lords profited from the use of slaves to pick their tobacco crop. As part of the Black Lives Matter campaign in 2020, many of Glasgow's streets in the Merchant City area - named after the Tobacco Lords - were unofficially renamed by anti-racism protesters.

The protesters placed alternative street names celebrating prominent black men and women alongside the official street names. Ingram Street was alternatively named Harriet Tubman Street, after the celebrated abolitionist.
