= Robert Foulis (printer) =

British printer (1707-1776)

- Born: 20 April 1707; Glasgow, Scotland, Great Britain
- Died: 2 June 1776 (aged 69); Glasgow, Scotland, Great Britain
- Burial place: Glasgow, Scotland, United Kingdom

Robert Foulis (20 April 1707 – 2 June 1776) was a Scottish printer and publisher, and creator in 1752 of The Glasgow Academy of the Fine Arts, known better as The Foulis Academy, in conjunction with the University of Glasgow.

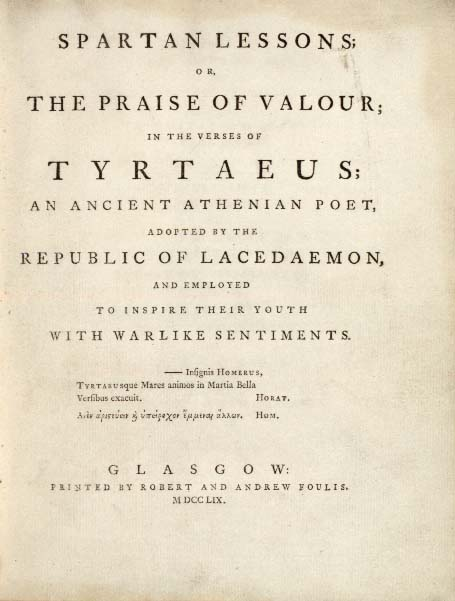
Spartan Lessons; Glasgow: Robert and Andrew Foulis, 1759 (title-page)

== Biography ==
=== Publishing ===
Robert Foulis was born the son of a maltman. He was apprenticed to a barber, but was encouraged to become a publisher by Francis Hutcheson who was impressed by his ability. After spending 1738 and 1739 in England and France in company with his brother Andrew, who had been intended for the church and had received a better education, Robert set up a publishing business in 1741 in Glasgow, and in 1742 acquired his own press. He bought type from the renowned type-maker and punch-cutter Alexander Wilson. In 1743, he was appointed printer to the Glasgow University. In the same year he produced the first Greek book published in Glasgow, namely the De Elocutione by Demetrius Phalereus. It was also offered in Latin.

Soon he went into partnership with his brother. Their press published books in English, Latin, Greek, French and Italian that were noticeable for their quality. Indeed, the brothers were sometimes referred to as "the Elzevirs of Britain." They spared no pains, and Robert went to France to procure manuscripts of the classics, and to engage a skilled engraver and a copper-plate printer.

Among authors whose works were published by the Foulis press were Homer, Horace, Milton and Thomas Gray. The Homer, for which John Flaxman's designs were executed, is perhaps the most famous production of the Foulis press. Famous as well, the 12mo edition of Horace was long, but erroneously, believed to be immaculate: though the successive sheets were posted in the university and a reward offered for the discovery of any inaccuracy, six errors at least, according to Thomas Frognall Dibdin, escaped detection; three of those were found by Duke Gordon.

The names of the brothers are often reproduced on title-pages and colophons of their publications in their Latinized form, "Robertus et Andreas Foulis".

=== The Foulis Academy ===
The brothers, especially Robert, had an ambition to establish an institution for the encouragement of the fine arts. Though one of their chief patrons, the Earl of Northumberland, warned them to "print for posterity and prosper," they spent their money in collecting pictures, pieces of sculpture and models, in paying for the education and traveling of youthful artists, and in copying the masterpieces of foreign art. The Foulis Academy, more correctly The Glasgow Academy of the Fine Arts was established in Glasgow in 1752, linked to the University of Glasgow; its pupils including James Tassie and David Allan. In the teachers it attracted from France and Italy and the collection of paintings it made available to students it brought a new sophistication to art-training in Scotland. William Cochran, Archibald McLauchlan, David Allan, John Paxton, James Maxwell, Charles Yorke and David, Earl of Buchan were among the artists who benefited from travelling scholarships arising from the Foulis Academy. The Academy was a success, but not profitable to the brothers, and left them in reduced circumstances. Robert went to London, hoping to realize a large sum by the sale of his pictures. They were sold for much less than he anticipated, as Christie the auctioneer stated the market was glutted and the buyers not in town.

Dr David Murray in his book of 1911 summarises the achievements of the 20-year life of the academy:

The Academy was an unfortunate venture from a commercial point of view, but it was a grand conception. It was planned on a great scale, and excellently organised, and was carried on for more than twenty years with amazing energy under enormous difficulties. Such a scheme nowadays would be possible only with the aid of a handsome endowment, or of a state or a municipal subvention; but Robert Foulis undertook it practically single-handed, and achieved what must be considered a marked success.

Robert was the author of a Catalogue of Paintings with Critical Remarks.

=== Death and legacy ===
The brothers were buried in the Ramshorn Cemetery. Due to a widening of Ingram Street the graves now lie beneath the pavement but are still marked, using their initials in the paving.

The business was afterwards carried on under the same name by Robert's son Andrew. W. J. Duncan's Notices and Documents illustrative of the Literary History of Glasgow, printed for the Maitland Club in 1831, among other things contains a catalogue of the works printed at the Foulis press, and pictures, statues and busts in plaster of Paris produced at the Academy in the University of Glasgow.

== Sources ==
- The Foulis Academy and Foulis Press Collection - Glasgow Libraries https://libcat.csglasgow.org/web/arena/foulis-academy
- Robert & Andrew Foulis, the Foulis Press and Their Legacy - University of Glasgow https://www.gla.ac.uk/myglasgow/library/files/special/exhibns/foulis/index.htm
- Famous Glaswegians: Robert Foulis
- Gazetteer for Scotland: Robert Foulis
- Robert & Andrew Foulis, the Foulis Press, and Their Legacy
- The Glasgow Story: Robert Foulis and Andrew Foulis
- Chisholm, Hugh, ed. (1911). "Foulis, Andrew and Robert" . Encyclopædia Britannica (11th ed.). Cambridge University Press.
- The Foulis Press and The Foulis Academy - Glasgow's Eighteenth-Century School of Art and Design, by George Fairfull-Smith, 2001
- Robert & Andrew Foulis, and the Glasgow Press, with some account of The Glasgow Academy of the Fine Arts: by David Murray, published by James Maclehose & Sons, 1911.
