= Robert Carrick =

Scottish banker (1737–1821)

Robert Carrick of Braco (aka Robin Carrick) (1737–1821) was an 18th-century Scottish banker, who was one of the richest men ever to have lived in Scotland. A cold, hard man, he was a notorious miser. He was short and dumpy in stature with thin grey hair, tied in a pigtail. Carrick Street in central Glasgow was named in his honour in 1800.

== Life ==
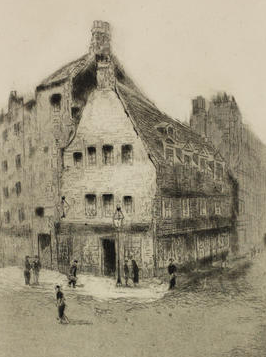
The Old Ship Bank in Glasgow - Carrick's solitary attic room can be seen on the upper roof face

He was born in the manse of Houston, Renfrewshire, the eldest son of Rev Robert Carrick and his wife Margaret Paisley Simson, daughter of Rev Prof John Simson of Glasgow College. His brother John Carrick became a surgeon in Glasgow.

He entered banking as an apprentice clerk in 1752 aged 15 in the Old Ship Bank (then owned by Dunlop, Houston & Co). One of the partners of the bank was Andrew Buchanan, an old personal friend of his father from their student days, and it is likely that Buchanan took him under his wing. Robert Carrick senior had been personal tutor to the Buchanan family and therefore Robert spent part of his childhood in the Buchanan home and was treated somewhat like a son of Buchanan.

In 1775 he became manager and partner in the Old Ship Bank then owned by Moores Carrick & Company.

Around 1785 he appears to have acquired the estates of Braco north-east of Glasgow.

From 1796 he was Bailie of the city and was Dean of Guild from 1802.

He died in his private attic rooms over the Ship Bank (then owned by Carrick Brown & Co) on 20 June 1821. He lived there with a single servant: his niece Miss Paisley. Miss Paisley was equally infamous, as Carrick had instructed her to haggle every farthing when shopping for food.

The building stood on the corner of Saltmarket and Bridgegate. The building no longer exists but is remembered by the "Old Ship Bank" public house on the ground floor.

When he died he left over £1 million, an outstanding fortune. This mainly passed to David Buchanan (1760–1827), nephew of Andrew Buchanan of Drumpellier, who thereafter named the family Carrick-Buchanan in respect of this windfall. David was also a joint partner in the Ship Bank at the time of Carrick's death.

Despite his wealth (and due to his lack of family and lack of pre-planning to secure a grave of note) he is buried in an unmarked grave in the Ramshorn Cemetery in central Glasgow.
