= Alexander Ranken =

Personal life
- Born: February 28, 1755
- Died: February 23, 1827 (aged 71)

Religious life
- Religion: Christianity

Alexander Ranken (1755–1827) was an 18th/19th century Church of Scotland minister and historian, who served as Moderator of the General Assembly in 1811.

== Life ==
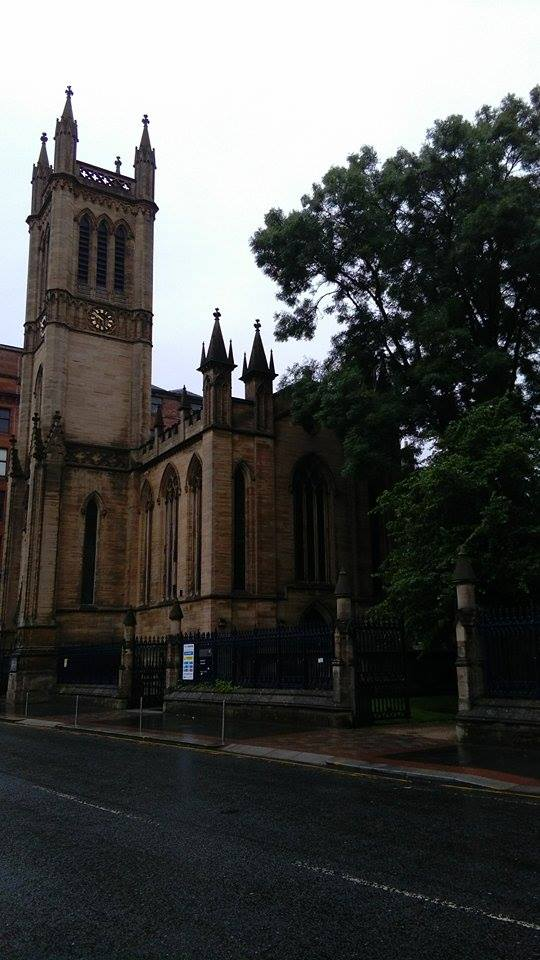
St David's Church (Ramshorn) and the entrance to Ramshorn Cemetery on Ingram Street, Glasgow

He was born in the village of Currie just south of Edinburgh on 28 February 1755. He was presumably educated at the Church School in Currie which was run by Rev James Craig who had previously been a master at George Heriot's School. He certainly studied at the University of Edinburgh. He was licensed to preach by the Presbytery of Edinburgh in April 1779.

He was assistant to Rev Henry Moncrieff-Wellwood at St Cuthbert's Church, Edinburgh 1779 to 1781, before being ordained as minister of Cambusnethan in August 1791. On 5 July 1785 he was presented by the Glasgow Magistrates and Council to the North West Parish in Glasgow also known as St David's Church or (more commonly to the locals) as the "Ramshorn Church", standing adjacent to the ancient Ramshorn Cemetery. He was formally translated to this new position in September 1785.

In April 1801 the University of Glasgow awarded him an honorary Doctor of Divinity.

As a historian he is remembered for his huge "History of France". This was criticised as "inaccurate" by Henry Hallam of the Edinburgh Review, but this is perhaps unfair given the scale and scope of the work, and in that it was based on other historical documents.

In 1811 he succeeded Hugh Meiklejohn as Moderator of the General Assembly of the Church of Scotland the highest position in the Scottish church.

In 1824 the Ramshorn Church was rebuilt in a Gothic style, presumably with some direction from Ranken.

He died at home at 106 (Upper) Montrose Street (just north-west of the Ramshorn) in Glasgow on 23 February 1827 shortly before his 72nd birthday. He is buried in the Ramshorn Cemetery next to his church.

== Publications ==
- "The Importance of Religious Establishments" (1799)
- "A History of France from the Time of the Conquest of Clovis to the Death of Louis XVI" - 9 vols. (1802-1822)
- "The Nature of Baptism Briefly Stated" (1803)
- "Institutes of Theology" (1822)

== Family ==
In 1782 he married Euphemia Thomson (1757-1822) daughter of James Thomson. They had one daughter and one son:

- Margaret (1783-1786)
- Andrew Rankin of Ashburn (1785-1851) who became a Glasgow merchant and baillie.

== Artistic recognition ==
He was portrayed by Peter Paillou.
