= John Anderson (theologian and controversialist) =

Scottish theologian

John Anderson (1668?–1721), was a Scottish theologian and controversialist.

== Biography ==
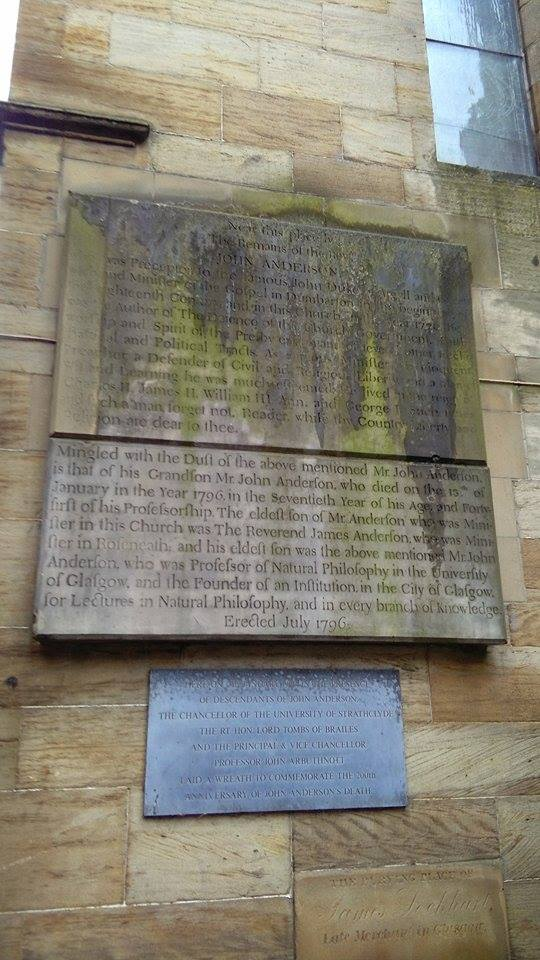
Memorial to John Anderson and his grandson, Ramshorn Cemetery, Glasgow

He was tutor to John, Duke of Argyll and Greenwich. He was ordained minister of Dumbarton, entered the controversy between Episcopacy and Presbyterianism. Great anxiety was felt at the time by the presbyterian clergy in connection with the general use of the English liturgy in the episcopalian congregations, which had not been in common use among them till the beginning of the eighteenth century.

About 1710, Anderson published ‘A Dialogue between a Curate and a Countryman,’ and in 1711 ‘The second Dialogue between the Curate and the Countryman respecting the English Service.’ He next published ‘The Countryman's Letter to the Curate, wherein, besides an historical view of the English Liturgy, the assertions of Sage, the author of the “Fundamental Character of Presbytery,” concerning its universal usage in Scotland at the time of the Reformation, &c., are examined and proved to be false.’ A reply to this was published by an episcopalian clergyman, Robert Calder which drew forth a rejoinder from Anderson, Curate Calder whipt.

The work by which Anderson continues to be known is a ‘Defence of the Church Government, Faith, Worship, and Spirit of the Presbyterians,’ published in 1714, in reply to a work entitled ‘An Apology for Mr. Thomas Rhind, or an account of the manner how, and the reasons for which, he separated from the Presbyterian party and embraced the communion of the Church’ (Edin. 1712). This publication has always been considered one of the ablest defences of the Presbyterian system.

About the beginning of 1717, steps were taken for translating Anderson to Glasgow. The magistrates were favourable, and the ministers hostile; but after an appeal to the general assembly, his translation took place in 1720, and he became minister of what was then called the Ramshorn church, now St. David's.

He afterwards published six letters upon the ‘Overtures concerning Kirk Sessions,’ a subject on which there was considerable discussion at that time. ‘In these letters,’ says M'Crie, ‘he does not appear to great advantage. They were answered in better temper and with much ability by Professor Dunlop of Edinburgh.’ Wodrow, who speaks of him as ‘a kind, frank, comradely man when not grated,’ owns that he could be passionate and bitter, and tells how, in answer to his remonstrance with him for the Billingsgate style of his letters to Calder, he said that ‘it was the only way to silence Calder.’ After his removal to Glasgow, he seems to have fallen both in ability and character. Though he had been the champion of presbytery, he fell under the censure of his brethren for what they considered an un-Presbyterian service—a sort of consecration sermon preached at the opening of his church.

He died in 1721, at the age of 53. He is buried in the churchyard of his own church, now called the Ramshorn Cemetery on Ingram Street in Glasgow.

John Anderson, his grandson (son of the Rev. James Anderson, minister of Roseneath), founded Anderson's College, Glasgow, and erected a tombstone over his grandfather's remains.'
