= Drumpellier Country Park =

Country park in North Lanarkshire, Scotland

Coordinates: 55°51′51″N 4°03′22″W

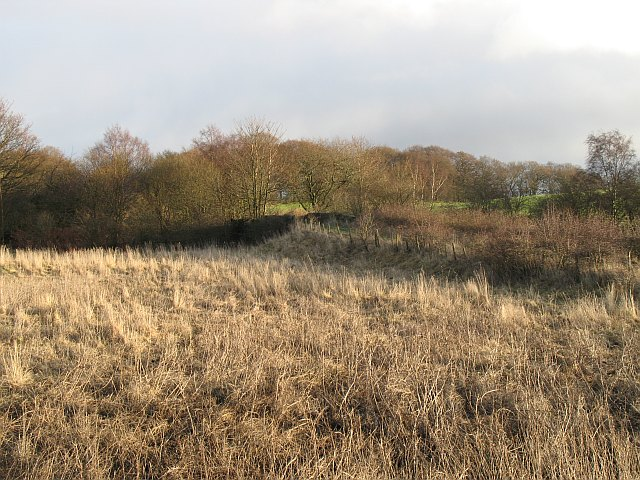
Drumpelier Country Park

Drumpellier Country Park is a country park situated to the west of Coatbridge, North Lanarkshire, Scotland. The park was formerly a private estate. The land was given over to the Burgh of Coatbridge for use as a public park in 1919, and was designated as a country park in 1984 by the then Monklands council, part of Strathclyde. The park covers an area of 500 acres (200 hectares) and comprises two natural lochs (one of which is a Site of Special Scientific Interest (SSSI)), lowland heath, mixed woodlands and open grassland. The Monkland Canal lies towards the southern perimeter of the park. The lochs and the canal attract many water birds, both resident (such as swans and mallard ducks) and over-wintering migrants, and the loch shores and woodland floor provides an abundance of wild flora. The woodlands are also rich in bird life, small wild animals and many types of fungi.

The lochs at Drumpellier are part of a chain of kettle ponds formed towards the end of the last ice age. As the glacier that covered most of Scotland slipped down towards the sea it churned up great tracts of land. This created the great lochs, such as Lomond and Linnhe, and also produced small pockets of water such as the Garnkirk chain of Hogganfield, Frankfield and the Bishops Lochs (an SSI that comes under Glasgow City Councils administration) that include Drumpellier's Lochs, Woodend and Lochend. The lochside path is approximately one mile (1.5 kilometres) long and it is suitable for bikes.

Since July 2019 the park has been the location of Drumpellier Country Parkrun.

== Etymology ==
The name Drumpellier may have a Brittonic origin. The generic may be dīn- meaning "a fort, a hill-fort" (Welsh din). Suffixed to this is *peleidr, a plural form of *paladr meaning "a shaft, a beam". The etymology seems identical to Dunpender, and either name may have been transferred from the other, though there is no evidence of a fort here.

== Ancient history ==
Mankind has left its mark on the park area over many thousands of years. Flint tools of the Stone Age have been found on the shores of Woodend Loch and Lochend Loch (always referred to locally as Drumpellier Loch) once boasted a fine example of a crannog, a dwelling place of iron-age man situated on stilts in open water for security and protection. The site of the crannog is depicted on Lochend Loch using small coloured buoys.

During the medieval period, Drumpellier (then called Dunpeleder) was the farming grange of the Monks of Newbattle Abbey, which gives rise to the name of Monklands, the historical name for the surrounding area. The name Drumpellier itself means 'ridge where the wheat is stored'. Finally, the Monkland Canal lies at the south end of the park, and is a reminder of the great industrial heritage of Monklands, providing an important link through Glasgow to the Clyde and the high seas.

== Drumpellier House ==
The Drumpellier estate was purchased in 1735 by the tobacco merchant Andrew Buchanan (1690–1759). He was responsible for building the oldest part of Drumpellier House in 1736 and it was extended in the 1740s and 1750s. Additions were made to it in 1840 and 1850.

Andrew Buchanan was a tobacco merchant who became Lord Provost of Glasgow in 1740. The son of a wealthy maltman, Buchanan took advantage of the Treaty of Union which gave Scotland access to the English colonies and amassed a fortune through ownership of tobacco estates in Virginia. He also acquired a considerable portfolio of property in Glasgow. He purchased the Drumpellier Estate in 1739 and built Drumpellier House as his home two years later.

Though no supporter of their cause, he led a group of prominent citizens who met Prince Charles Edward Stuart (1720–88), and was able to considerably reduce the amount of money demanded by the Jacobites not to raze the city.

He was buried in the Ramshorn kirkyard. In 1777, the family business failed when their tobacco estates were lost following the American Revolution. Buchanan Street in Glasgow is named after his nephew, another Andrew Buchanan.

The Drumpellier estate was gifted to Coatbridge in 1919. Many Glaswegians traveled by tram to Drumpellier during the 1920s and 30s, to spend their weekends camping in the park. The house was demolished in the 1960s. The estate is now a Country Park and golf course.

Sir James Stirling RN (28 January 1791 – 23 April 1865) was a British naval officer and colonial administrator, who was born in Drumpellier. His enthusiasm and persistence persuaded the British Government to establish the Swan River Colony and he became the first Governor and Commander-in-Chief of Western Australia.
