= Brora (retailer) =

Scottish luxury fashion brand

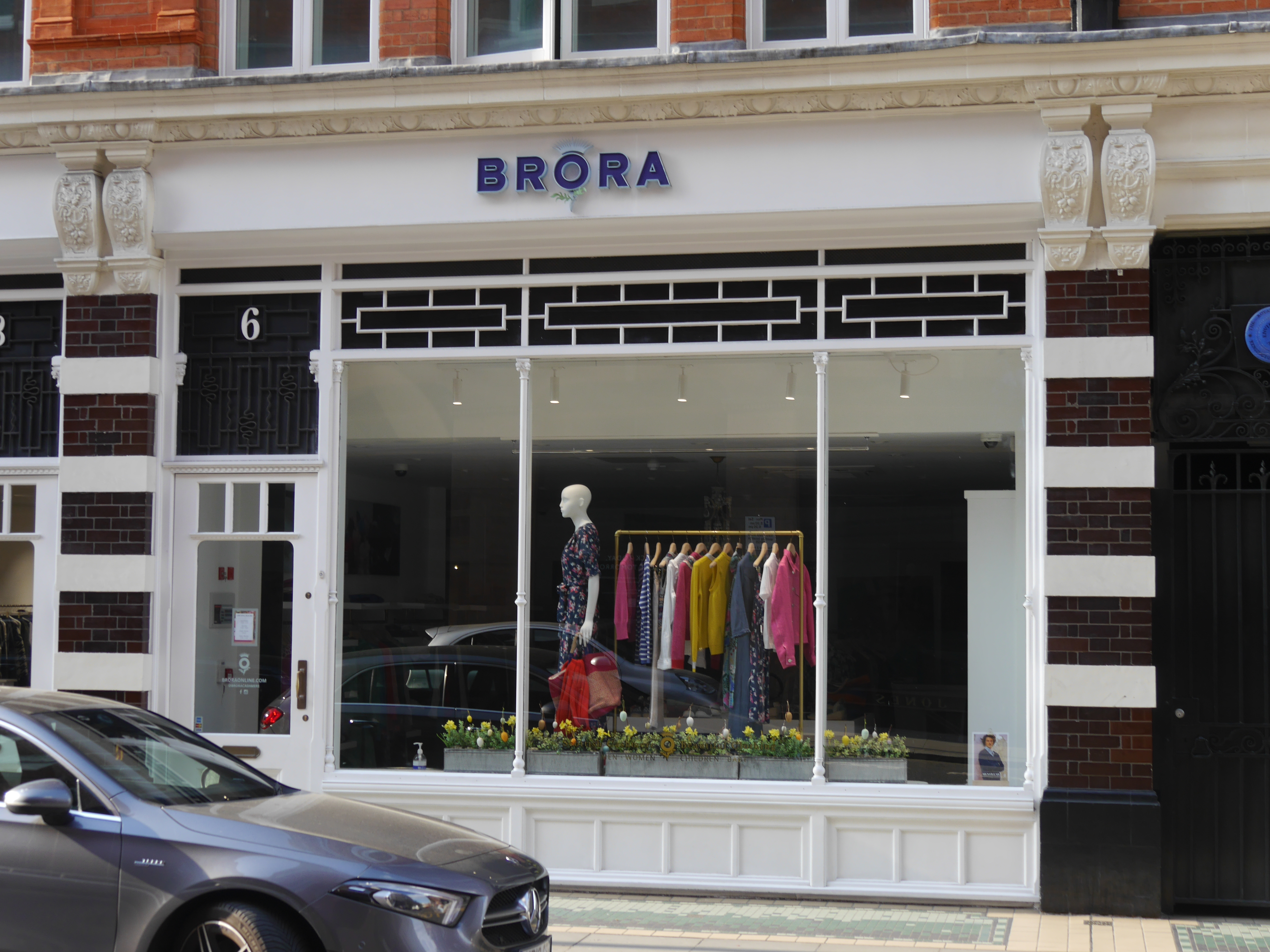
Brora, Symons Street, London, April 2022

Brora is a Scottish luxury fashion brand, best known for its cashmere garments.

Brora was founded in March 1993 by Victoria Stapleton, who is the owner and creative director. After her family became involved with Hunters of Brora, a 100-year-old tweed mill in Brora, north east Scotland, she established a retail business, focused on cashmere and tweed.

As of 2018, the brand had 14 stores in the UK and one on Madison Avenue in New York City. The clothes "are very often made here in the UK." All of the cashmere is produced in a mill in the Scottish borders.
