= Samuel Waddington =

British civil servant, traveller and poet

Samuel Waddington (1844 – 7 November 1923) was a British civil servant, traveller and poet.

== Life ==
He was the second son of Thomas Waddington of Boston Spa, Yorkshire. He was educated at St Peter's School, York and matriculated at Brasenose College, Oxford in 1862, graduating B.A. in 1865.

Waddington worked in the marine department of the Board of Trade. He died in Kilburn on 7 November 1923. He is buried at Kensal Green Cemetery.

== Works ==
- English Sonnets by Living Writers (1881)
- Arthur Hugh Clough: A Monograph (1883)
- Collected Poems (1902)
- Chapters of My Life (1909) autobiography

Waddington wrote for periodicals including The Academy, the Athenaeum, and the Pall Mall Gazette.
