= Andrew Buchanan of Drumpellier =

Scottish merchant and lord provost (1690–1759)

Andrew Buchanan of Drumpelier
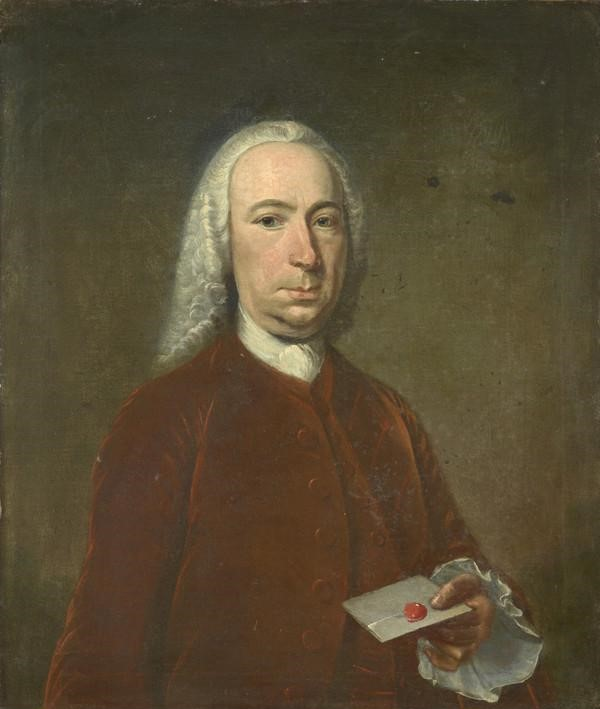
- Andrew Buchanan of Drumpelier, Merchant and Lord Provost of Glasgow, 1740
- Lord Provost of Glasgow: (1740–1742)
- Born: 29 January 1691
- Died: 20 December 1759 (Aged 68)
- Burial: Ramshorn Cemetery
- Wife: Marion Montgomery
- Scottish clan: Clan Buchanan
- Father: George Buchanan (1653–1719)
- Mother: Mary Maxwell (1662–1741)
- Occupation: Scottish tobacco merchant, Lord Provost of Glasgow (1740–1742)

Andrew Buchanan of Drumpellier (29 January 1691 – 20 December 1759) was a Scottish tobacco merchant who was one of Glasgow's "Tobacco Lords". He served as Lord Provost of Glasgow from 1740 to 1742. Buchanan Street in Glasgow is named after him.

== Background and early life ==
Born on 29 January 1691, Andrew Buchanan was the second of four sons of George Buchanan, a maltster, and Mary Maxwell, the daughter of Gabriel Maxwell, a respected Glasgow merchant. His father had been a Covenanter who had fought at the Battle of Bothwell Bridge who descended from a branch of the old family of Buchanan of Buchanan and Leny.

In his youth, he shared lodgings with Rev Robert Carrick, then a Divinity student. Rev Robert Carrick's son, also Robert Carrick became a rich banker, and later left his entire fortune in gratitude to the nephew of Andrew Buchanan, David Buchanan. In appreciation of this windfall, he changed the family to Carrick-Buchanan.

== Life ==
In 1725, with his brothers Neil and Archibald Buchanan, he founded the Buchanan Society a charity which gave financial help to apprentices and widows of the Buchanan clan. The Society still exists and provides hardship and educational grants to those of the clan and its septs.

He was one of the first Scots to have tobacco plantations in "the New World", with major holdings in Virginia. He is believed to have owned up to 300 slaves.

In 1735, with his new-found wealth, he purchased the estate of Drumpellier building Drumpellier House there from 1736 to 1739 and extending it twice thereafter. In 1737 he bought an additional estate at Auchentorlie.

He was elected dean of guild in 1728, and lord provost in 1740. When after the battle of Prestonpans John Hay, quarter-master of the Pretender, arrived at Glasgow with a letter demanding a loan of £15,000, Buchanan and five others were chosen commissioners to treat with him, and succeeded in obtaining a reduction to £5,500. On account of his zeal in raising new levies on behalf of the government, Buchanan made himself so obnoxious to the rebels that in December 1745 he was ordered to pay a personal levy of £500 by Prince Charles Edward Stuart. This was made on him under threats of plundering his house, to which he replied "they might plunder his house if they pleased, but he would not pay one farthing."

In 1750, he was one of the joint founders of the Old Ship Bank on the corner of Saltmarket and Bridgegate, Glasgow's first local bank.

== Andrew Buchanan Bros. and Co. ==
Andrew Buchanan was one of the first of the Buchanans to take full advantage of the American tobacco trade opening up to Scotland after 1707 subsequently owning property and plantations in Virginia. By the 1720s he and brothers Neil and Archibald were fully involved in the trade through their company Andrew Buchanan, Bros. & Co., becoming in 1730 Glasgow’s largest tobacco importer at over 500,000 lbs per annum and owning, in 1735, five ships, the Glasgow, Pr. William, Argyle, Buchanan and the Virginia Merchant. In 1737 Neil left the partnership and it became known as Andrew and Archibald Buchanan & Co. In 1749 Archibald also left to set up his own company with John Bowman and others, the original company becoming Andrew Buchanan, Son & Co. this time with brother George as a partner.

=== Other business interests ===
Andrew’s other business interests included the King Street sugar house in Glasgow, linen works, rope works and a sailcloth factory. He was also one of the founders of the Ship Bank in Glasgow in 1749 and was also responsible for Robert Carrick joining the bank as a clerk at the age of 14, his father the Rev. Robert Carrick being Andrew’s tutor as a student.

== Property and estates ==
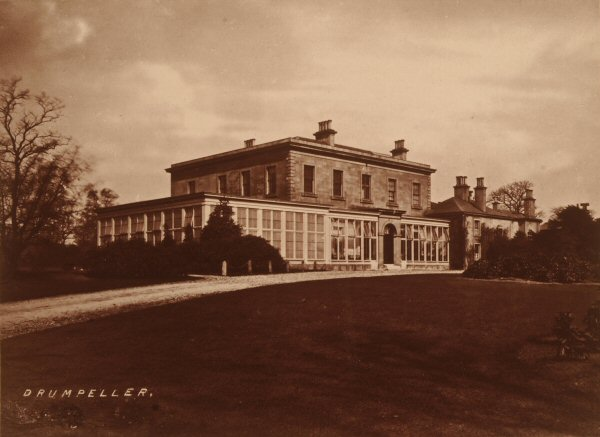
The Drumpellier Estate as it was in 1878 taken by Thomas Annan

=== Drumpellier estate ===
The Drumpellier estate was purchased by Andrew Buchanan in 1735. He was responsible for building the oldest part of Drumpellier House in 1736 and it was extended in the 1740s and 1750s. Additions were made to it in 1840 and 1850.

Andrew's descendant, Lt Col Carrick Buchanan, gifted Drumpellier House and its grounds to the town of Coatbridge in 1919. Many Glaswegians traveled by tram to Drumpellier during the 1920s and 30s, to spend their weekends camping in the park. The house was demolished in the 1960s and it is now known as Drumpellier Country Park.

The park covers an area of 500 acres (2.0 km^{2}) and comprises two natural lochs, lowland heath, mixed woodlands and open grassland.

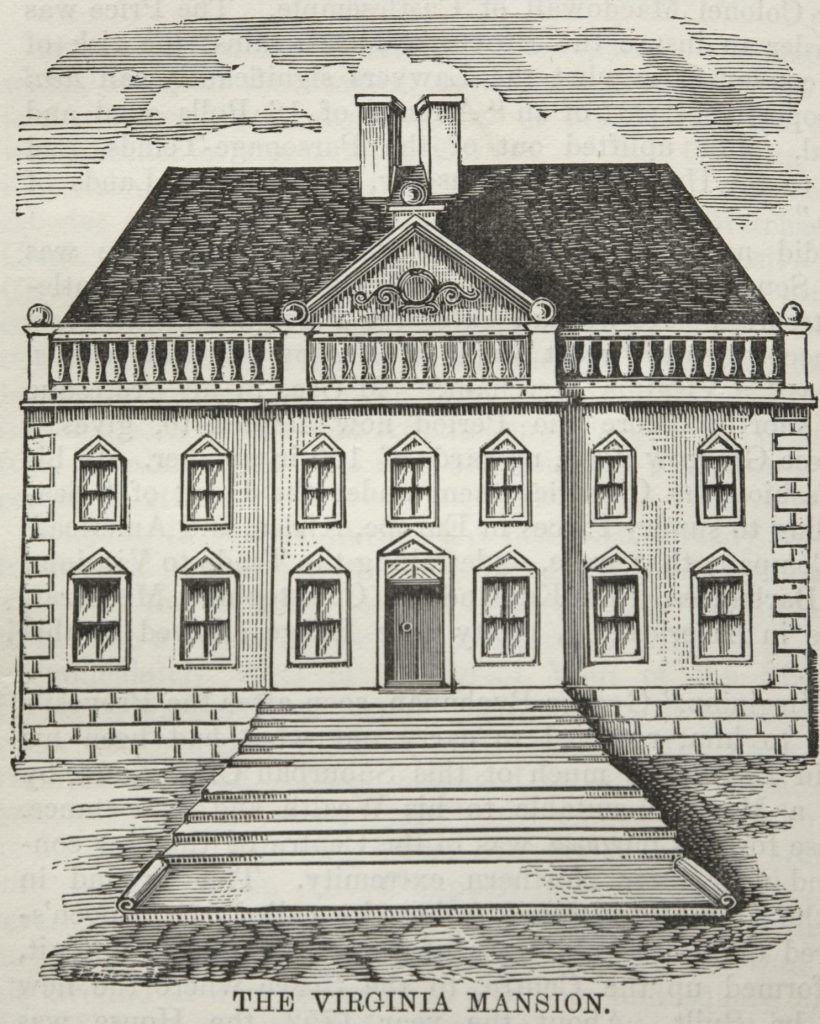
Engraving of Virginia Mansion, early-mid 19th century.

=== Virginia Street and Mansion ===
In 1719, Buchanan purchased a property at the Long Croft in Glasgow. He purchased two further properties nearby in 1732 and 1740. Having assembled sufficient adjoining properties he then created a new street: Virginia Street, lined with new villas. He planned to build a large stately home for himself on the street called Virginia Mansion, which he did not live to complete. After Andrew Buchanan’s death, his son George Buchanan of Mount Vernon (1728–62), completed the opulent mansion, in accordance to his father’s wishes.

The mansion was sold in 1770 to another tobacco merchant connected with the same family. Alexander Speirs of Elderslie whom of which was Andrew's Brothers son-in-law

The Virginia Mansion was described as: "a very spacious edifice and finely proportioned" with a seven-bay façade, obviously influenced by the design of its near-neighbor, the Shawfield Mansion.

The Virginia Mansion is situated on the site of the modern-day Corinthian in Ingram Street. Virginia Street still exists in the Merchant City but none of the original houses survive.

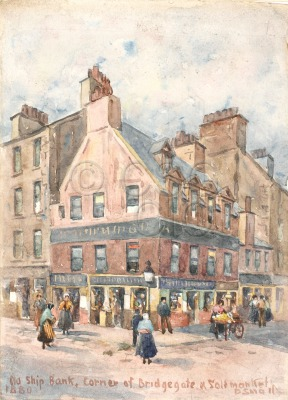
Watercolor Painting of the Old Ship Bank by David Small in 1880

=== Old Ship Bank ===
The Ship Bank or more usually Old Ship Bank was an independent bank formed in Glasgow in 1750 which was also Glasgow's first bank. The bank was created in 1750 by Andrew Buchanan of Drumpellier and other "Virginia Dons"

Its early staff is unclear but in 1752 Robert Carrick arrived as a trainee banker aged 15 at the time. His position was obtained through his father being an old personal friend of Andrew Buchanan in their student days, and it is likely that Buchanan took him under his wing. Rev Robert Carrick had been personal tutor to the Buchanan family and therefore Robert spent part of his childhood in the Buchanan home and was treated somewhat like a son of Buchanan.

In 1775, Robert Carrick became manager and partner in the Old Ship Bank then owned by Moores Carrick & Company.

Carrick died in 1821 with a personal worth of over £1 million: three times the assets of the bank itself. This fortune mainly passed to David Buchanan (1760–1827), nephew of Andrew Buchanan of Drumpellier, who had no blood connection to Carrick, thereafter David Buchanan named the family Carrick-Buchanan in respect of this windfall.

== Family ==
He married twice, firstly to Marion Montgomery in 1723 (aged 32) with whom he had two sons and four daughters.

His eldest son James Buchanan of Drumpellier (1726–1786) and his second son George Buchanan of Mount Vernon (1728–1762). followed in his footsteps and became involved in the Virginia trade through their respective companies.

Although James Buchanan of Drumpellier inherited his father's tobacco plantations and estates, including Drumpellier on his father's death in 1759, he was ruined in 1777 following the American Revolution. He sold the bulk of his estates to his cousin, Andrew Stirling (of William Stirling & Sons). The estate was reacquired by James' nephew, David Buchanan in 1808 (later known as David Buchanan Carrick).

George Buchanan of Mount Vernon did not live long to enjoy his properties, urban and rural. He died on Tuesday, 20 July 1762, at the early age of thirty-four. His portrait is preserved in Drumpellier House, beside that of his father.

James was also Lord Provost from 1768 to 1770 and again from 1774 to 1776.

Andrew's wife Marion died in 1743. In the following year he married his second wife, Elizabeth Binning, aged 35, the daughter of Edinburgh advocate Charles Binning.

Andrew's daughter, Mary Buchanan, married Scottish philosopher and historian William Stirling. Their son, John Stirling of Tullichewan, bought Tullichewan Castle in 1792.
