= Ramshorn Cemetery =

Cemetery in Scotland

Coordinates: 55.8601°N 4.2447°W

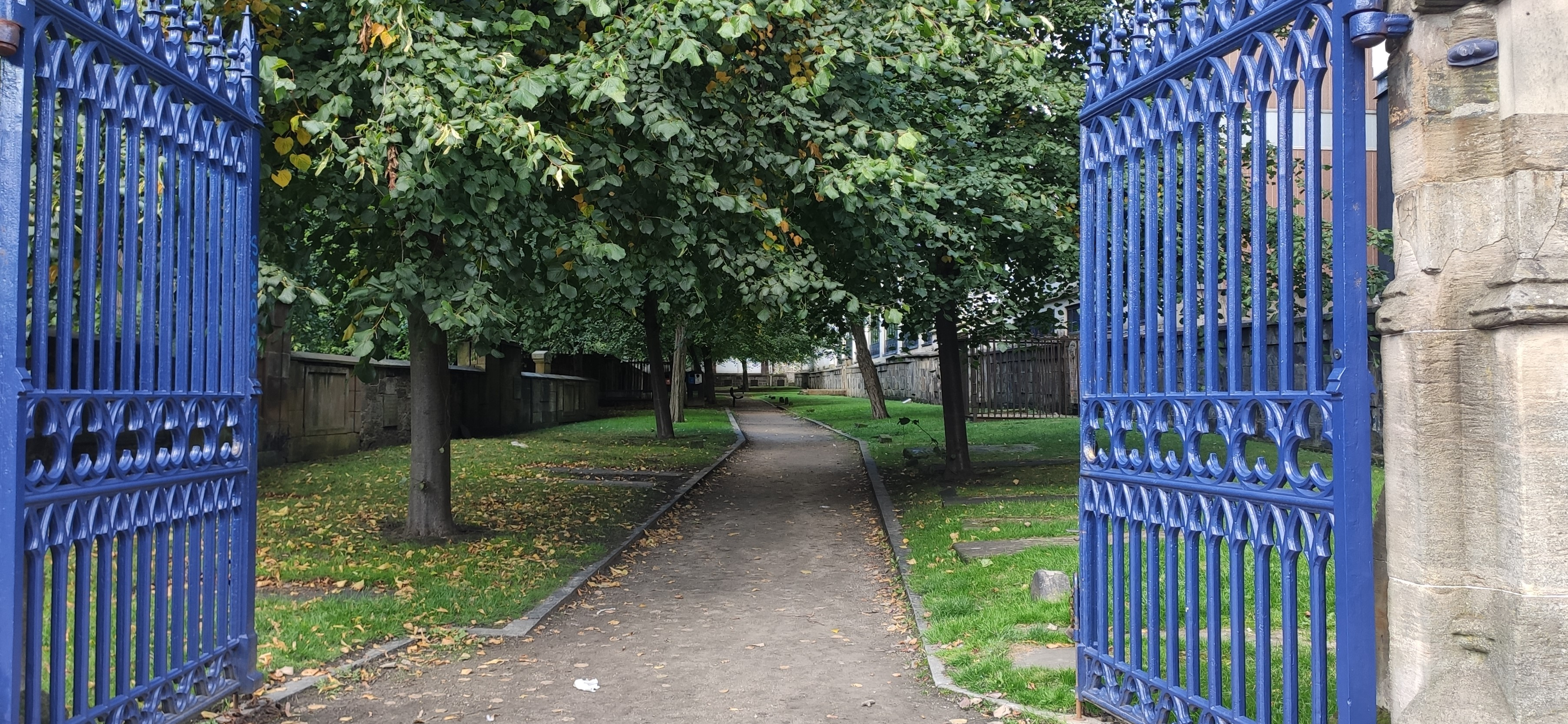
Ramshorn Cemetery, Glasgow

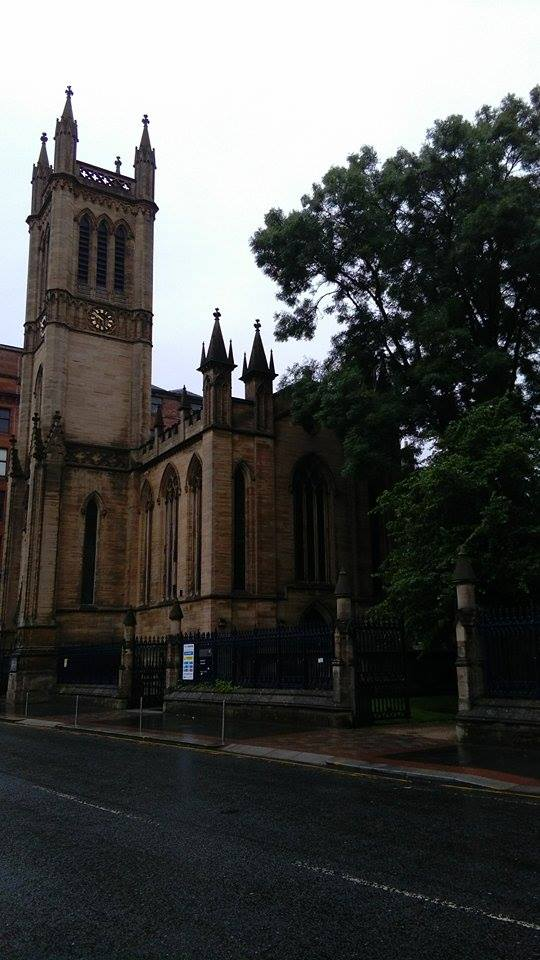
St David's Church and the entrance to Ramshorn Cemetery on Ingram Street, Glasgow

The Ramshorn Cemetery is a cemetery in Scotland and one of Glasgow's older burial grounds, located within the Merchant City district, and along with its accompanying church, is owned by the University of Strathclyde. It has had various names, both official and unofficial: North West Parish Kirkyard; St David's Kirkyard; and Ramshorn and Blackfriars. The latter name tells of its link to Blackfriars Church, linking in turn to the pre-Reformation connection to the Blackfriars Monastery in Glasgow.

The burial ground was used from 1719 to 1915. In the 20th century it was remodelled along the lines of the London Improvements Act, moving most stones to the perimeter to create a usable park area. Apart from some flat stones still remaining in-situ this has largely disconnected the stones to the actual spot of interment.

In 1813 the body of Janet McAlister was stolen from the graveyard, being found with 4 others in College Street Medical School.

In 1824 the church of St David was built on its southern side, designed in a fine Gothic style by the English architect Thomas Rickman, with modifications by local architect James Cleland.

The cemetery is effectively in three sections: the original cemetery; an enclosed central walled area where the old church stood; and two small walled sections flanking the new church. Unusually monuments adopt only two forms: wall monuments and flat slabs, other than a small row of small 18th-century stones upright but partly sunk into the ground, standing in a line to the north-east.majority of graves are to rich Glasgow merchants. The austere style reflects Scottish Calvinist views.

John Anderson, the founder of Anderson's Institute - which would evolve into the Royal College of Science and Technology and then ultimately the University of Strathclyde, is also interred in the site.

== Notable interments ==
- John Anderson (theologian and controversialist) (1668–1721)
- John Anderson (natural philosopher) (1726–1796)
- Andrew Buchanan of Drumpellier (1690–1759), tobacco merchant, Lord Provost of Glasgow 1740–42
- Robert Carrick (1737–1821) banker and millionaire (unmarked grave) a notedly unloved man
- James Couper (1752–1836), astronomer
- David Dale (1739–1806) merchant and social reformer
- Robert Findlay (minister) (1721–1814) and his son Robert (1745–1862)
- Andrew Foulis (printer) (1716–1775)
- Robert Foulis (printer) (1707–1776)
- John Glassford (1719–1783), tobacco merchant
- Pierre Emile L'Angelier (1823–1857), the victim in the Madeleine Smith murder case
- Henry Monteith (1764–1848), Lord Provost of Glasgow 1814–1816
- Andrew Dryburgh Provand (1838–1915) MP
- Rev Alexander Ranken, minister of the adjacent church 1785 to 1827, Moderator in 1811
- Robert Rodger Lord Provost 1707–9 and 1711–3 and MP for Glasgow Burghs 1708–10
- Robert Simson (1687–1768), Scottish mathematician
- Moses Stevens of Bellahouston (1806–1871)
- Hugh Wylie (d.1782), Lord Provost of Glasgow 1780–82

== Other monuments ==
A memorial to the Canadian politician, John A. Macdonald born in Ramshorn Parish in 1815
