= John Anderson (natural philosopher) =

Scottish natural philosopher (1726–1796)

John Anderson FRSE FRS FSAScot
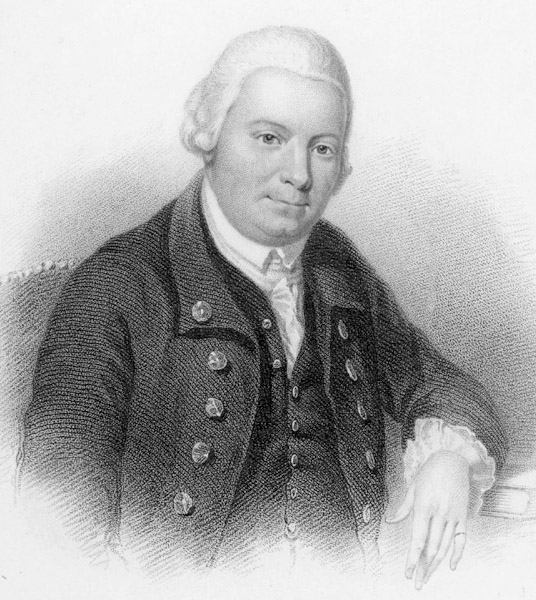
- Born: 26 September 1726; Rosneath
- Died: 13 January 1796 (aged 69); Glasgow
- Education: University of Glasgow

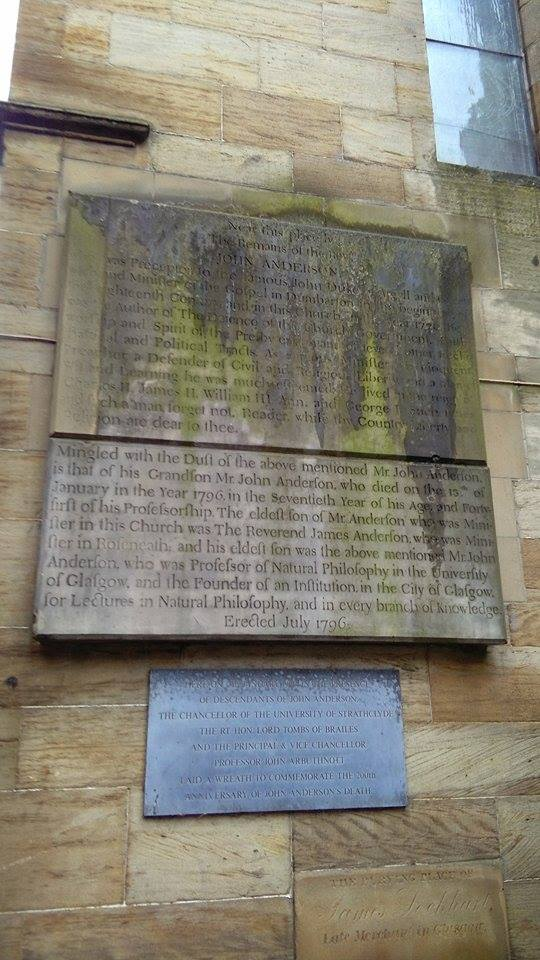
Memorial to John Anderson and his grandfather, Ramshorn Cemetery, Glasgow

John Anderson FRSE FRS FSAScot (26 September 1726 – 13 January 1796) was a Scottish natural philosopher and liberal educator at the forefront of the application of science to technology in the Industrial Revolution, and of the education and advancement of working men and women. He was a joint founder of the Royal Society of Edinburgh, and was the posthumous founder of Anderson's College (later Anderson's Institution), which ultimately evolved into the University of Strathclyde.

== Early life and career ==
Anderson was born at the manse at Rosneath, Dunbartonshire, the son of Margaret Turner (d. 1784) and Rev James Anderson His father and grandfather were prominent ministers of the church. After his father's death he was raised by his aunt in Stirling, where he attended grammar school.

He graduated with an MA from the University of Glasgow in 1745.

During the Jacobite Rising of 1745 he served as an officer in the Hanoverian Army.

From 1755 to 1757 he was Professor of Ecclesiastical History in the University of Glasgow, and from 1757 to 1796 Professor of Natural Philosophy. He is the longest-serving natural philosophy lecturer during the 18th century.

== A scientist ==
In 1760, Anderson was appointed to the more congenial post of professor of natural philosophy at the University of Glasgow. He began to concentrate on physics. He had a love of experiments, practical mechanics and inventions. He encouraged James Watt in his development of steam power. He was acquainted with Benjamin Franklin, and in 1772 he installed the first lightning conductor in Glasgow.

Anderson also wrote the pioneering textbook Institutes of Physics published in 1786, which went through five editions in ten years. He was elected a Fellow of the Royal Society and this brought him into contact with many of the scientists of the day.

== A supporter of vocational education for working people ==
His greatest love though was in providing "useful learning" to the working class, especially in the application of science to industry. He did this alongside his University duties, by providing non-academic lectures for artisans during the evenings. In these popular lectures he concentrated on experiments and demonstrations, and from his predilection for setting off explosions and fireworks, he acquired the nickname "Jolly Jack Phosphorus".

== Radical politics ==
Anderson was also known for his radical political views and was a supporter of the French Revolution. In 1791 he invented a new type of six-pound gun, which was presented to the National Convention in Paris as "the gift of Science to Liberty". While he was in France, neighbouring Germany, fearing the spread of radical politics to its territory, imposed a blockade on French newspapers. Anderson suggested sending pamphlets on the wind to Germany attached to small hydrogen balloons, and this was done, with each balloon bearing an inscription translated as "O'er hills and dales, and lines of hostile troops, I float majestic, bearing the laws of God and Nature to oppressed men, and bidding them with arms their rights maintain."

== Founder of a university ==
Building on the lectures for artisans, he bequeathed his property for the foundation of a school in Glasgow devoted to "useful learning", called Anderson's Institution or Andersonian University. As an example of its success it enabled a young millworker, David Livingstone, to become a famous missionary doctor and the foremost explorer of his day. The Institution underwent various name-changes and a number of mergers with other colleges before arriving at its current form as the University of Strathclyde, which honours Anderson in the name of the physics building and the main library, the Andersonian Library. The city centre campus is named the John Anderson Campus.

John Anderson died in Glasgow at the age of 69. He is buried with his grandfather in Ramshorn Cemetery on Ingram Street in Glasgow. On 13 January 1996 representatives from the University of Glasgow laid a wreath to mark the bicentennial of Anderson's death.
