= Andrew Foulis =

Scottish printer (1712–1775)

- Born: 1712
- Died: 1775 (aged 62–63)
- Occupation: Scottish printer

Andrew Foulis (1712 – 18 September 1775) was a Scottish printer, brother of Robert Foulis. They worked in partnership as printers to the University of Glasgow publishing many books in Latin and Greek, and reaching fame in printing and in art.

== Biography ==
Andrew Foulis was the son of a Glasgow barber and maltman (brewer), named Andrew Faulls (or Faulds). Andrew's brother was Robert Foulis, and both reached fame in printing and in art.

Andrew Foulis, was intended to be trained for the church, and hence received the better education than Robert Foulis, who was intending to take up his father's trade as a barber. However, Robert still sat in on classes at the University of Glasgow and received an unofficial education and a formal mentor from Francis Hutcheson. Both Andrew and Robert had changed their surname from Faulls to Foulis in the 1730s. Robert shared a passion with Andrew Foulis for knowledge and found the way for them to contribute to academia beyond a professorship; also, the professor Francis Hutcheson was the first person to encourage Robert to take up an interest in Book selling and printing. Robert had initially started the press, however Andrew Foulis had joined in on the venture to form a partnership after spending 1738 and 1739 in England and France together. In Paris, Andrew and Robert had found some extraordinary books that they had purchased, imported back to England and then sold them for a profit; hence the beginning of their lucrative and prestigious partnership. Andrew and Robert's enterprise would continue for the next 30 years.

Andrew and Robert Foulis continued to expand the range of editions of classical works. The Foulis Press imported rare editions and acquired manuscripts from mainland Europe, selling them to local scholars and collectors. They printed editions of books ranging from fine press editions to more practical formats, including miniature editions. The Foulis Press editions of classical books were noted for their simplicity and practical size.

He is buried with Robert in the Ramshorn Cemetery on Ingram Street. Due to a widening of Ingram Street the graves now lie beneath the pavement but are still marked, using their initials in the paving.
