= John Glassford =

Scottish merchant and planter

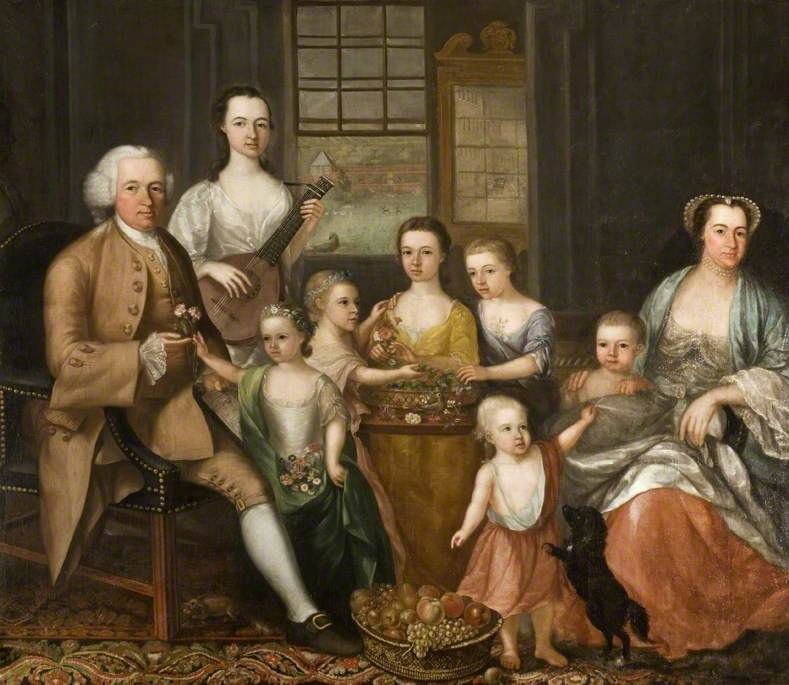
A portrait of Glassford, his family and an enslaved Black servant by Archibald McLauchlan c. 1767

John Glassford (c. 1715 – 27 August 1783) was a Scottish merchant and planter. One of the most prominent Tobacco Lords of Scotland, Glassford owned tobacco-producing slave plantations in the British North American colonies of Virginia and Maryland, for which he has become controversial in the 21st century.

== Background and early life ==
Glassford was born in Paisley, the third son of James Glassford, a merchant and burgess in Paisley. Glassford went on to marry first a merchant's daughter, then a baronet's, then an earl's. His immense wealth allowed for the construction or purchase of a number of major properties in and around Glasgow; Whitehill, Shawfield and Dougalston, from which he took his title, are the most notable. He appeared to pride himself on home improvements, especially on the Dougalston estate, where he enacted an extensive programme of planting and building, and even the creation of an artificial lake, Dougalston Loch. The Glassford Family Portrait, commissioned from artist Archibald McLauchlan in 1766 – and currently exhibited in Glasgow's People's Palace – shows Glassford with members of his family in their city home the Shawfield Mansion. This house stood on what is now Glassford Street in Glasgow, named in his honour. Glassford sired fourteen children in all, though only eight survived to adulthood. The portrait also features the faint outline of a Black servant, which serves to highlight Glassford's involvement in the slave trade.

== Tobacco trade ==
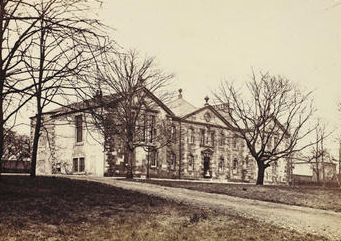
Whitehill House north-east of Glasgow

From 1710 Glasgow became the focus of an economic boom which lasted nearly fifty years. This was the age of the Tobacco Lords, the nouveau riche of the mid eighteenth century.

In 1742 Glassford joined his brother-in-law Archibald Ingram in his Calico Printworks at Pollokshaws. In or before 1745 he bought the ruinous mansion of Shawfield which was the target of the Malt tax riots in 1726 and previously the home of John Campbell of Mamore. He acquired this central site largely due to the land it stood on (now the site of Glassford Street). On Christmas Day 1745 Bonnie Prince Charlie arrived and billeted at the ruinous Shawfield for ten days.

Around 1760 he built Whitehill House to the north-east of Glasgow.

Glassford entered the tobacco trade in 1750 further invited by Archibald Ingram to create Ingram & Glassford. He soon made a success of his venture, with a fleet of vessels and a large number of tobacco stores across New England. Celebrated in his lifetime, Glassford was the most extensive ship owner of his generation in Scotland, and one of the four merchants who laid the foundation of the commercial greatness of Glasgow through the tobacco trade. Tobias Smollett wrote of a meeting with Glassford in 1771:

I conversed with Mr Glassford, whom I take to be one of the greatiest merchants in Europe. In the last war, he is said to have had at one time five and twenty ships with their cargos – his own property – and to have traded for above half a million sterling a year.

In business Glassford was not confined to traffic from the colonies. He had begun his career in the 1740s with various manufacturing interests and with his tobacco wealth he continued this patronage. Almost all of the principle manufacturing establishments in Glasgow had his support, and he was a leading partner in the Glasgow Arms and Thistle Banks. However, it was the tobacco trade that was to be his financial downfall. The American War of Independence (1775–83) ruined Glasgow's part in the trade, and while other tobacco lords were shrewd enough to sell their shares in the business before the crash, Glassford was not among them.

When he died, at his home, Shawfield Mansion, on 27 August 1783, he had debts of over £93,000. He is buried in Ramshorn Cemetery on Ingram Street in Glasgow.

== Family life ==
Glassford married, in 1743, Ann Coates (d. 18 December 1751), a daughter of Archibald Coats. They had five children, but only Jean survived.

His second wife was Ann Nisbet (25 August 1721 - 8 April 1766), 3rd daughter of Sir John Nisbet of Dean, 3rd Baronet, and Ann Myreton, whom he married in 1752. There were six children from this marriage.

Glassford married, as his third wife, Margaret Mackenzie (d. 29 March 1773), sixth daughter of George Mackenzie, 3rd Earl of Cromartie. From this marriage he had:

- James, advocate, Sheriff-Depute of Dumbartonshire, who died 28 July 1845
- Isabella
- Euphemia.

== Legacy ==
As one of Glasgow's leading 'tobacco lords', modern recognition of Glassford has been surprisingly sparse considering his contribution to the mercantile history of Glasgow. This is a fact that was recognised in 1881 by George Stewart who in his collection Glasgow's Old Commercial Aristocracy noted that Glassford was "at one time the very prince of Glasgow merchants, and now almost forgotten".
