= Tobacco Lords =

Group of 18th-century Scottish merchants

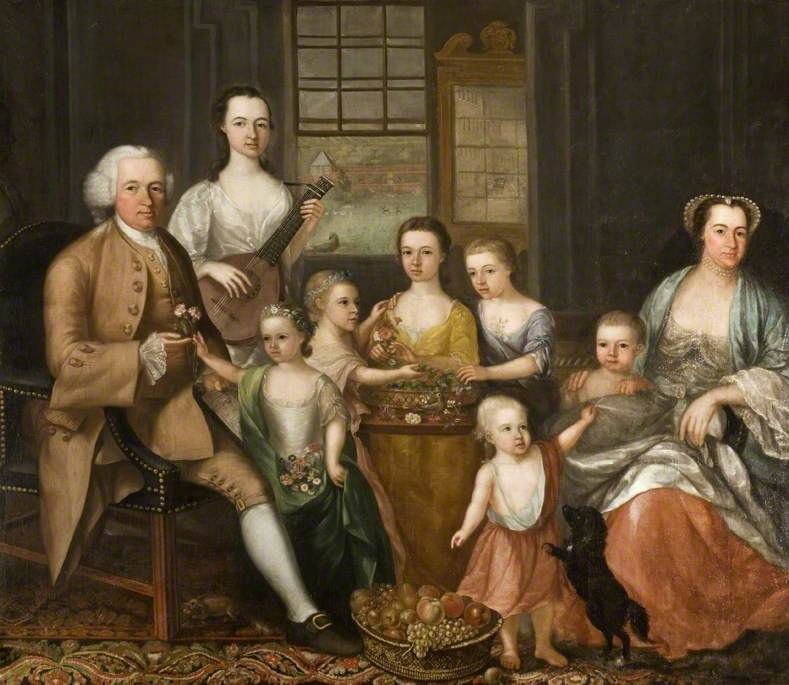
c. 1767 portrait the Tobacco Lord John Glassford and his family

The Tobacco Lords were a group of Scottish merchants active during the Georgian era who made substantial sums of money via their participation in the triangular trade, primarily through dealing in slave-produced tobacco that was grown in the Thirteen Colonies. Concentrated in the port city of Glasgow, these merchants utilised their fortunes, which were also partly made via the direct ownership of slaves, to construct numerous townhouses, churches and other buildings in Scotland.

== History ==
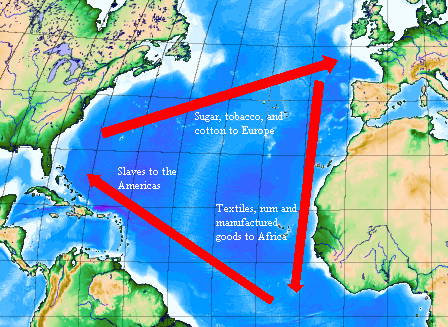
The "Triangular Trade"

In 1707, the Treaty of Union between Scotland and England gave Scottish merchants access to the English colonies, especially in North America. Glasgow's position on the River Clyde, where the westerlies hit Europe as well as in other places like Bristol, Nantes, or Bordeaux, may have been an opportunity for its merchants. The French monarchy granted Glasgow in 1747 a monopoly for the importation of tobacco into French territories. The deepening of the Clyde in 1768 provided a further advantage because Glasgow ships were built specifically for the Atlantic crossing and were generally bigger than those of other ports.

The tobacco trade was part of broader trade that linked exports of consumer and manufactured goods from Europe with the North American and Caribbean colonies. Operated on plantation economies fuelled by slave labour, these colonies supplied products that found a ready market in Europe. The triangle involved merchants carrying manufactured goods from Europe to West Africa to sell or exchange for slaves which they transported to America and the Caribbean. On the third leg back to Europe they carried tobacco, rum, cotton, sugar and the like.

From 1710, Glasgow became the centre of an economic boom which lasted nearly fifty years. The Tobacco Lords personified this boom and were the nouveau riche of the mid-eighteenth century. Arguably the most successful of these merchants was either Andrew Buchanan of Drumpellier or John Glassford. Glassford entered the tobacco trade in 1750 and soon acquired a fleet of vessels and many tobacco stores across New England. Celebrated in his lifetime, Glassford was the most extensive ship owner of his generation in Scotland and one of the four merchants who laid the foundation of the commercial greatness of Glasgow through the tobacco trade. Tobias Smollett wrote of a meeting with Glassford in 1771:

I conversed with Mr G--ssf--d, whom I take to be one of the greatest merchants in Europe. In the last war, he is said to have had at one time five and twenty ships with their cargos – his own property – and to have traded for above half a million sterling a year.

=== Palaces and churches ===
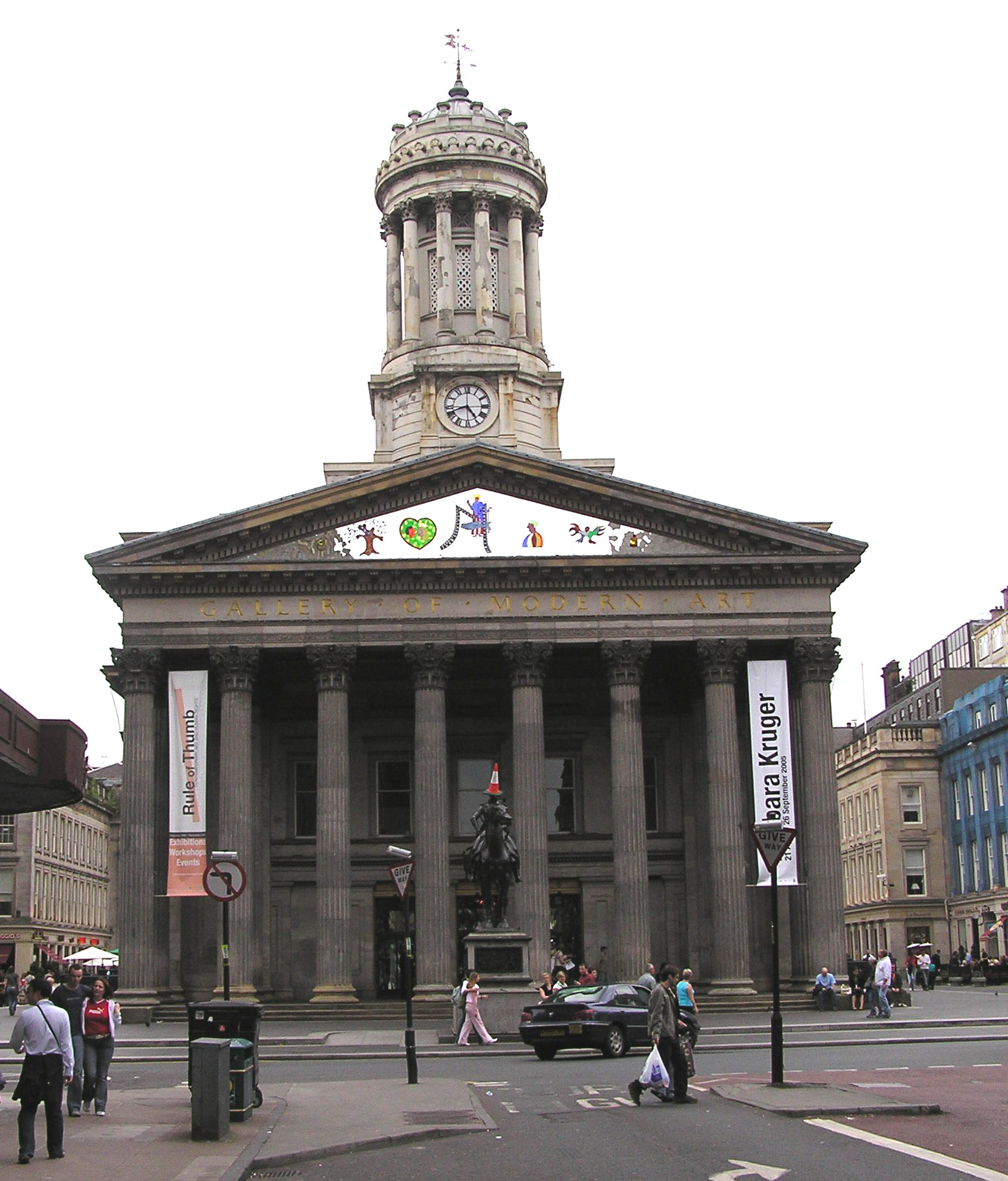
William Cunninghame's neo-classical mansion on Queen St, Glasgow, built in 1780 at a cost of £10,000

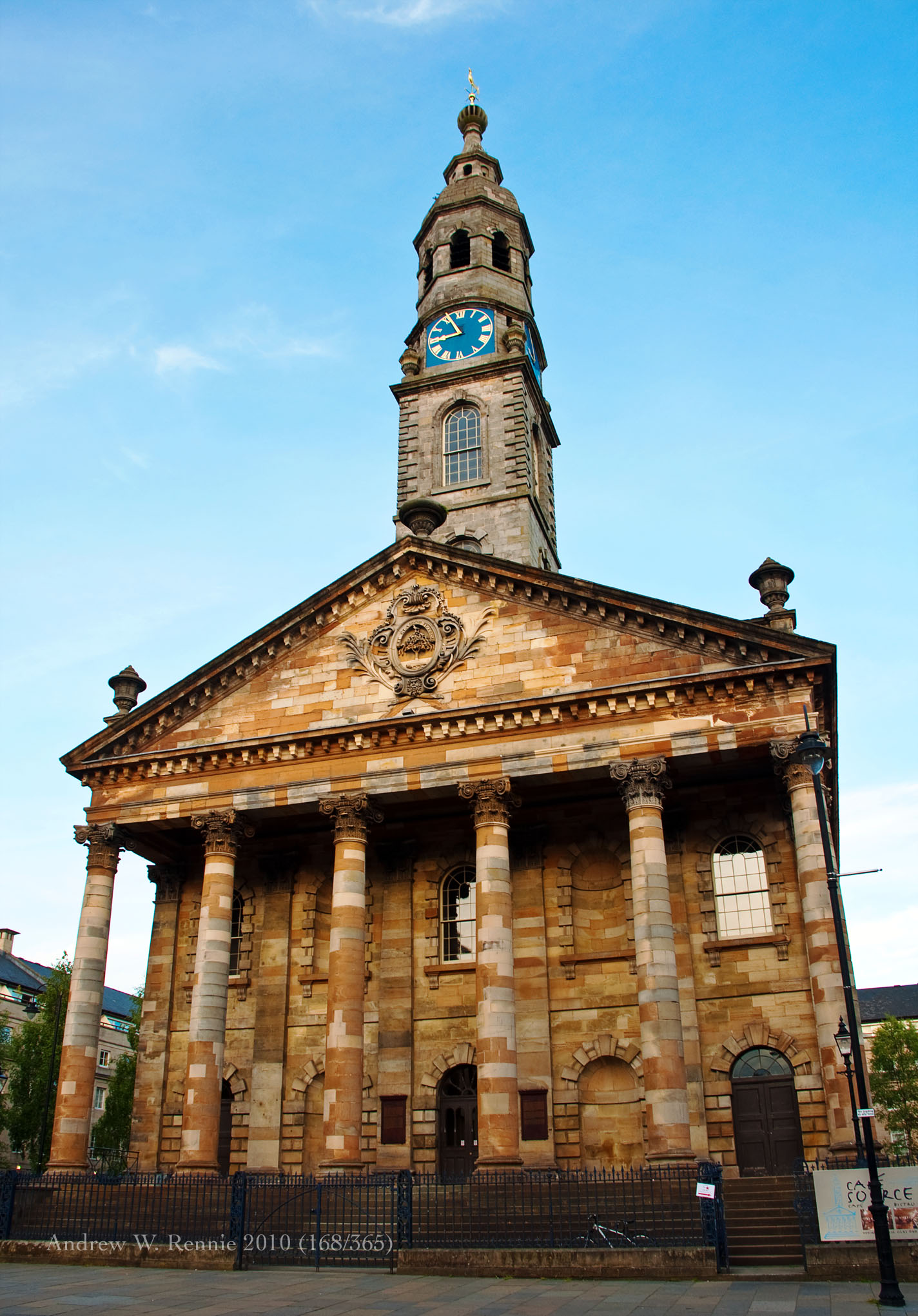
St Andrew's in the Square

Glasgow merchants made such fortunes that they adopted the style of aristocrats in their superior manner and in their lavish homes and churches. The merchants' Calvinist background made sure, however, that display was always of rich but sober materials – black silk clothes, (though startlingly set off by scarlet cloaks), black three-cornered hats, silver- (or even gold-) tipped ebony canes, mahogany furniture, and classical architecture in their domestic and public use. Their mansions were laid out on the western boundaries of the 18th century city, where they gave their names to later streets in what modern Glasgow now calls the Merchant City. Other streets recall the triangular trade more directly, with modern streets bearing names like Virginia Street and Jamaica Street. Among the important Tobacco Lords whose mansions gave their names to streets were Andrew Buchanan, James Dunlop, Archibald Ingram, James Wilson, Alexander Oswald, Andrew Cochrane, and John Glassford. The Virginia Mansion of Alexander Speirs gave Virginia Street its name, and Alexander gave his surname to Speirs Wharf in Port Dundas.

Some idea of the grandeur of the Tobacco Lords' houses - which often dramatically punctuated the ends of the streets named after them – can be had in the original core of Glasgow. The Gallery of Modern Art, which today occupies the (greatly expanded and embellished by later reconstruction as the Exchange) mansion built for William Cunninghame in 1780, at a cost of £10,000 (equivalent to £1.55 million in 2025). A more modest Tobacco Merchant's House (by James Craig, 1775) is being restored at 42 Miller Street.

St Andrew's Parish Church in St Andrew's Square, built 1739–1756 by Alan Dreghorn was the Tobacco Lords' ostentatious parish church. In the same area was the grand house of Alexander Speirs.

St Andrew's in the Square still survives today and is considered one of the finest classical churches in Britain, Today it is Glasgow's Centre for Scottish Culture, promoting Scottish music, song and dance. The church is located in St Andrew's Square, near Glasgow Cross and Glasgow Green, on the edge of the City's East End. The church, inspired by St Martin-in-the-Fields in London, was built between 1739 and 1756 by Master Mason Mungo Naismith. It was the first Presbyterian church built after the Reformation, and was commissioned by the city's Tobacco Lords as a demonstration of their wealth and power.

== American Revolution ==
During the 1760s, tensions grew between Britain and its North American colonies, among which were economic stresses arising out of the perceived unfairness of the Anglo-American tobacco trade. The market in tobacco was dominated by the Tobacco Lords, who American colonists claimed manipulated prices to the detriment of planters in Maryland and Virginia, who by the time of the outbreak of war in 1775 had accumulated debts of around £1,000,000, a huge sum at the time (equivalent to £175 million in 2025). These debts, as much as the taxation imposed by Parliament, were among the colonists' most bitter grievances. It was this extension of cheap credit that made the Tobacco Lords different. English merchants simply sold American tobacco in Europe and took a commission. The Scots, on the other hand, bought the crop at pre-arranged prices and made large (and potentially risky) loans to their customers.

Prior to 1740, the Tobacco Lords were responsible for the import of less than 10% of America's tobacco crop, but by the 1750s Glasgow handled more of the trade than the rest of Britain's ports combined. Heavily capitalised, and taking great personal risks, these men made immense fortunes from the "Clockwork Operation" of fast ships coupled with ruthless dealmaking and the manipulation of credit. Planters in Maryland and Virginia were offered easy credit by the Tobacco Lords, enabling them to buy European consumer goods and other luxuries before harvest time gave them the ready cash to do so. But when the time came to sell the crop, the indebted growers found themselves forced by the traders to accept low prices for their harvest in order to stave off bankruptcy. At his Mount Vernon slave plantation, future President of the United States George Washington saw his liabilities swell to nearly £2,000 by the late 1760s (equivalent to £315,382 in 2025). Thomas Jefferson, on the verge of losing his own slave plantation Monticello, accused British-based merchants of unfairly depressing tobacco prices and forcing Virginia planters to take on unsustainable debt loads. In 1786, he remarked:

A powerful engine for this [mercantile profiteering] was the giving of good prices and credit to the planter till they got him more immersed in debt than he could pay without selling lands or slaves. They then reduced the prices given for his tobacco so that…they never permitted him to clear off his debt.

After the war, few of the enormous debts owed by American colonists would ever be repaid. Despite these setbacks, after the war the Tobacco Lords switched their attention to other profitable parts of the triangular trade, particularly cotton in the British West Indies.

== Legacy ==
The impact of the Tobacco Lords on Glasgow's architectural heritage remains today. St Andrew's in the Square is today Glasgow's Centre for Scottish Culture, promoting Scottish music, song and dance. William Cunninghame's (greatly expanded and embellished) mansion now houses the Glasgow Gallery of Modern Art.

== Notable Tobacco Lords ==
- Andrew Buchanan of Drumpellier
- John Glassford
- Andrew Cochrane of Brighouse
- William Cunninghame
- James Dunlop
- John Glassford
- George Bogle of Daldowie
- Alexander Oswald
- Alexander Speirs
- John McCall of Black house and Belvidere

== See also ==
- History of Maryland in the American Revolution
- Fur Barons of Montreal
- Mercantilism
- British credit crisis of 1772–1773
