= James McDowall (Lord Provost) =

James McDowall or McDouall (1752–1808) was an 18th/19th century Scottish merchant who twice served as Lord Provost of Glasgow.

== Life ==
He was born on 20 January 1752 the son of William McDowall of Garthland and Castle Semple and his wife Elizabeth Graham (known as "Black Bess"). His father traded in sugar and rum in the West Indies.

James operated as a Glasgow merchant based on Buchanan Street. His brother John had premises on Jamaica Street. In 1787 he became a city Bailie under Provost John Riddell.

In 1790 he succeeded John Campbell of Clathick as Lord Provost of Glasgow and was succeeded in 1792 by Gilbert Hamilton of Glenarbuck. In 1796 he served a second term as Lord Provost, succeeding John Dunlop of Rosebank and was succeeded in 1798 by Lawrence Craigie. In his role as Provost he was responsible for establishing the Glasgow Royal Infirmary, the new "industrial prison" known as the Brideswell, the new Trades Hall, the Fleshers Haugh and the addition of John King's Park to Glasgow Green.

On a highly negative note he was chairman of the group lobbying against abolition of the slave trade.

He died on the island of Saint Lucia on 30 May 1808 aged 56.

== Family ==
He married twice: firstly to Isabel Peter (1751-1778) died of fever two days after the birth of her fifth child. He then married Margaret Jamieson with whom he had ten further children.

His elder brother William McDowall was MP for Renfrewshire.
