= Mungo Campbell =

Scottish merchant

Mungo Nutter Cambell

Mungo Nutter Campbell of Ballimore (1785–1862) was a 19th-century Scottish merchant who served as Lord Provost of Glasgow 1824/26.

== Life ==
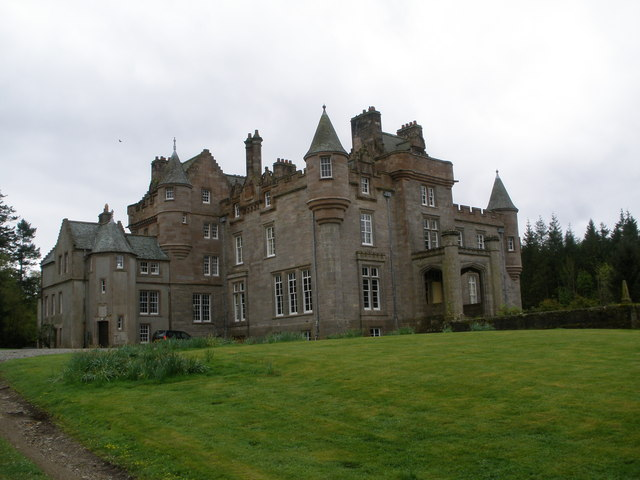
Ballimore House, Loch Fyne

He was born around 1785 the eleventh child of Alexander Campbell of Dallingburn (1739–1811) and his wife, Susanna Nutter Campbell (his father's cousin). His father was collector of customs at Port Glasgow.

He entered Glasgow University in 1799 but there is no record of his graduation.

In 1809 following his first marriage, he joined his father-in-law (and uncle)'s firm of John Campbell & Son, West Indies traders. The company reached its peak in 1821, with sugar plantations in the West Indies and Demerara.

In 1811 he inherited his father's estate at Dellingburn. In 1813 he purchased Belvidere as a residence. In 1820 he sold Belvidere and purchased the Ballimore estate on Loch Fyne.

In 1826 he is listed as a merchant living at 5 Blythswood Place and with premises at 35 Buchanan Street.

In Glasgow Town Council he served as Dean of Guild 1823/24 and Lord Provost 1824 to 1826.

In 1834 he received large compensation (over £50,000) for the loss of slaves (following the abolition of slavery in UK colonies) in British Guyana where he owned the Endeavour, Johanna, Enterprise, Annandale and Perth plantations.

In 1850 he was living at 12 Moore Place in Glasgow.

He died at Ballimore House on 26 July 1862.

== Family ==
He married his cousin, Helen Campbell, daughter of John Campbell of Morristoun (1735–1808), in Liverpool in 1809. They had three daughters.

His first daughter, Marion Helen Campbell (1810–1855) married John Macpherson-Grant, 2nd Baronet of Ballindalloch.

He secondly, in 1824, married Anne Amelia McLellan (born 1792)

His cousin, Colin Campbell of Colgrain (the "son" of John Campbell & Son) was immensely rich.

== Artistic recognition ==
He was painted by Sir Henry Raeburn around 1825.
