= Robert Craigie (Royal Navy officer) =

Royal Navy Admiral (1800–1873)

Admiral Robert Craigie (1800–1873) was a 19th-century Royal Navy officer of Scots descent who rose to the rank of rear admiral in active service and subsequently was promoted to admiral in retirement.

== Life ==
He was born in Canada in 1800 the son of John Craigie and his wife Susanna Coffin (widow of James Grant).

He joined the Royal Navy in 1811 and spent his whole life there, slowly rising through the ranks. Early in his life he was involved in action, when on board HMS Medway in the capture of USS Syren in July 1814.

By 1823 he had reached the rank of lieutenant and was serving on HMS Cameleon in 1824 when she captured an Algerian brig. In 1828 he was promoted to captain and commander. However, he then decided to undergo more formal training and took a leave of absence from the navy for three years to study navigation and mathematics at the Royal Navy College and University of Edinburgh.

In 1835 he had his first full command: HMS Scout, which patrolled the coast of Africa. This included two periods on the west coast when he was tasked with commanding the whole squadron. In March 1837 and again in 1838 he had to command his ship in the Bonny River in Nigeria. Here he was involved in the anti-slavery treaty agreed with King Peppel.

He returned to Britain in 1839 for lighter duties (on half pay). In 1847 he was sent to Shetland to oversee relief of the population which was badly hit by the potato famine of 1846. He spent two years as resident Inspector and a further three years as Inspector General. During this period he was responsible for much road building and road improvement on the island. He lived at 1 Queens Lane in Lerwick.

In November 1854 he was moved to Southampton to oversee steam packet organisation. In February 1855 he was appointed chairman of the Transport Board, organising supplies to the Crimean War. At the end of that war in November 1856 he was put in charge of the Royal William Victualling Yard and Royal Naval Hospital near Plymouth.

From 1858 he was placed on the Reserved List with the rank of rear admiral. He rose on the Reserved List to the rank of Admiral in 1870.

He died on 2 March 1873 in Dawlish on the Devon coast.

== Family ==
In April 1842 he married Charlotte Grant (1820-1887), twenty years his junior, and niece of the Right Hon Sir William Grant, Master of the Rolls. They had two sons and three daughters. The family originally lived with him in Melrose but moved with him to Lerwick when he was posted to Shetland.

His uncles were Robert Craigie, Lord Craigie and Lawrence Craigie, twice Lord Provost of Glasgow.

He was cousin to General Patrick Edmonstone Craigie.
