= John Campbell of Clathick =

Scottish merchant and philanthropist

John Coates-Campbell or John Coats Campbell of Clathick (1721–1804) was an 18th-century Scottish merchant and philanthropist who served as Lord Provost of Glasgow 1788 to 1790.

== Life ==
He was born in 1721 the son of Archibald Coates and his wife Jean Campbell heiress to the Clathick estate in the parish of Monzievaird in Perthshire. He adopted the surname of Campbell in order to inherit the Clathick estate: a 1000 acre estate with a large mansionhouse.

John became 6th laird of Clathick but spent much of his time as a tobacco merchant in Glasgow where he was one of the "Virginia Dons". He owned a large swathe of land in the city known as the Ryding district.

He was joint founder of the Thistle Bank (formally known as Maxwell, Ritchie & Co) in 1761 along with John Glassford, James Ritchie of Busbie and Sir Walter Maxwell of Pollok.

He was Dean of Guild from 1767. From 1771 to 1786 he was a Baillie of the city. In 1783 he was co-founder of the Glasgow Chamber of Commerce along with Gilbert Hamilton of Glenarbuck. In 1787 he is listed as a member of the Clyde Marine Society and on the Committee for the Management of the Forth and Clyde Navigation. He is also listed as Preceptor of Hutchesons' Grammar School.

In 1788 he succeeded John Riddell as Lord Provost of Glasgow. He was succeeded in 1790 by James McDowall. The city had a population of around 50,000 at this time.

From 1790 he retired from most public duties (including Chief Magistrate) and devoted himself to improving and repairing various hospitals, principally St Nicholas Hospital of which he had been "preceptor" since 1788. Despite much financial input the hospital was demolished in 1808 soon after Campbell's death (1804).

Clathick House survives (in a remodelled form) and is now a listed building.

== Family ==
He married Agnes Colquhoun, daughter of Laurence Colquhoun of Killermont. Their eldest surviving son Archibald Campbell (1756–1820) inherited the Clathick estate on the death of his father. When Archibald additionally inherited Killermont House from his mother's family he changed his name to Archibald Campbell-Colquhoun under which name he was renowned as a politician.

== Artistic recognition ==
He was portrayed by Sir Henry Raeburn.
