= John Hamilton (moderator) =

Minister of the Church of Scotland (1713–1780)

John Hamilton (1713–1780) was a minister of the Church of Scotland, who served as Moderator of the General Assembly in 1766.

== Life ==
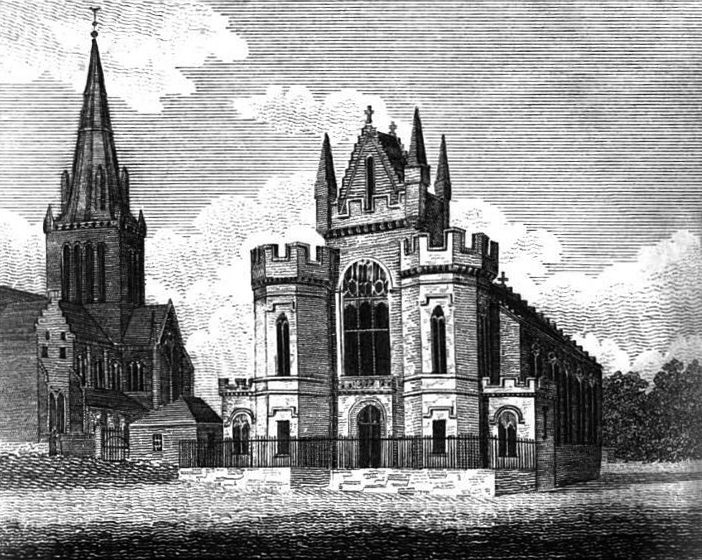
Barony Church, pictured in 1825

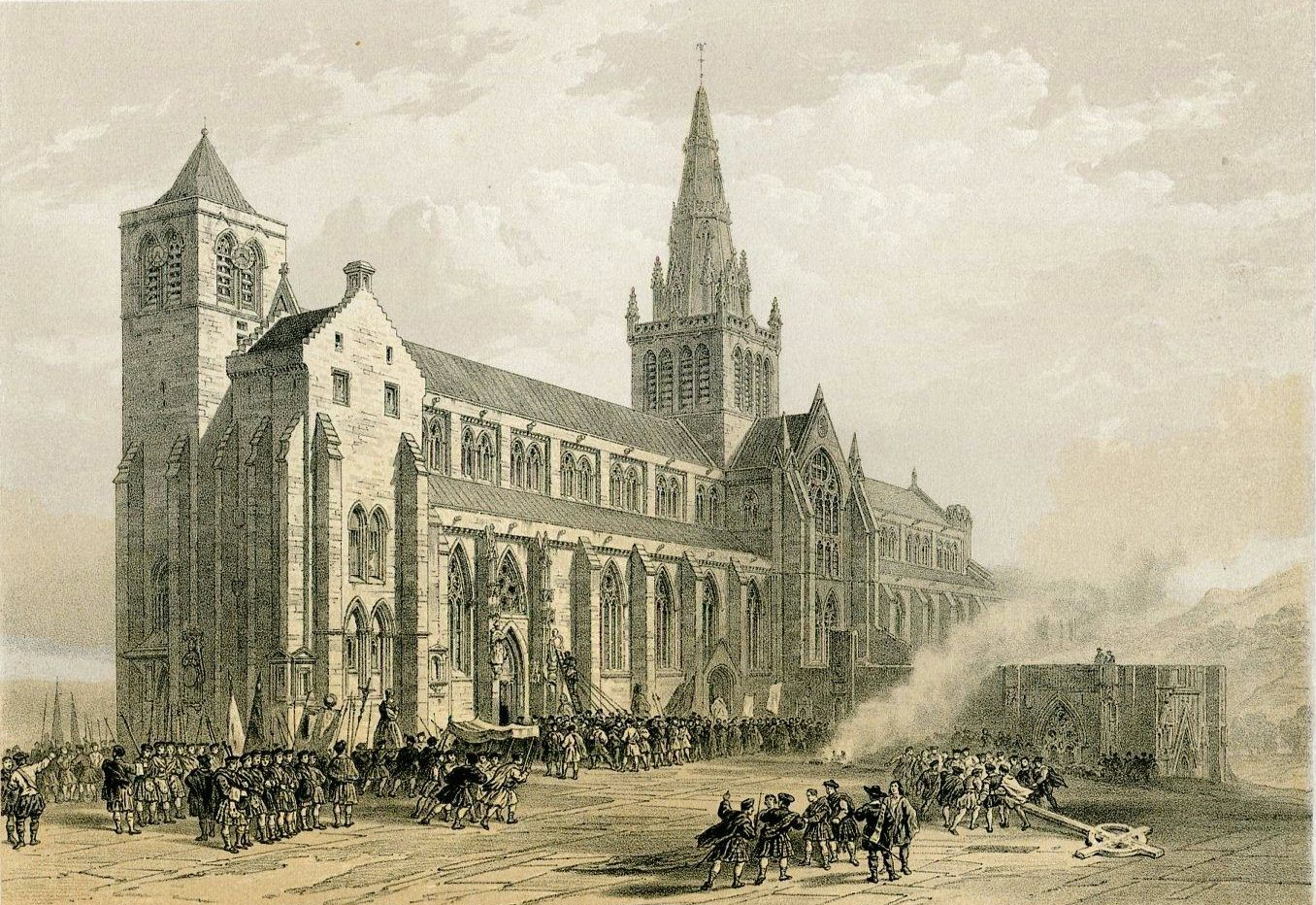
St Mungos High Kirk in Glasgow in the 18th century

He was born in Glasgow on 8 September 1713 the son of Rev John Hamilton (1670–1735) minister of Blackfriars Parish in Glasgow. He studied at Glasgow University.

He was ordained as minister of Barony Parish, Glasgow in September 1737. In December 1748 with George II as his patron, he was presented to the parish of St Mungo's in Glasgow (housed in what is now Glasgow Cathedral) and translated to this new position in March 1749 remaining in this role for over 30 years.

In 1766 he succeeded James Oswald as Moderator of the General Assembly of the Church of Scotland the highest position in the Scottish Church. He was succeeded by James Murison. Glasgow University awarded him an honorary Doctor of Divinity degree in the same year.

He died in Glasgow on 3 February 1780. His position at St Mungo's was filled by William Taylor.

== Family ==
In December 1742 he married Mary Campbell (d. 1747) daughter of George Campbell his predecessor at St Mungo's. They had one son John who died in 1749.

In February 1752 he married Mary Bogle (1727–1808) daughter of John Bogle of Hamilton Farm. Their children included:

- John Hamilton of North Park (1754–1827) three times Lord Provost of Glasgow. His daughter Mary Hamilton (daughter of John) married Rev David Welsh, (Moderator in 1842).
- George (b. 1755) died in infancy
- Patrick Hamilton (1757–1788) went to Jamaica
- William (b. 1758) died in infancy
- George Hamilton (1760–1837) Glasgow merchant. His son John George married Christina, daughter of Henry Monteith; their grandson was General Sir Ian Standish Monteith Hamilton
- Janet (b. 1763) died young
- Margaret (b. 1765) died young
- Mary (b. 1768) died young

== Publications ==
- The Practice of Religion Shewed to be Pleasant and Delightful (1767)
