= Robert Rodger =

Robert Rodger MP (c.1650 – c.1720) was a 17th/18th century Scottish merchant who twice served as Lord Provost of Glasgow including the critical junction of the Act of Union 1707 when the overarching power translated to London. He served as MP for Glasgow Burghs 1708–1710.

== Life ==
He was born in Glasgow the son of William Rodger, a skinner (leather-maker) and Burgess of the city. His father left Glasgow and went to Ireland in 1655 but did not take his family with him. As a merchant Robert traded with the Americas and the West Indies.

He was a Burgess from 1680 and rose to be Treasurer of the City from 1693. He was Bailie multiple times from 1695 onwards, Dean of Guild 1697–1699.

In 1707 he succeeded John Aird as Lord Provost of the city, and after a period of interchange every two years between Aird and Rodgers (the position being held for a duration of two years) ended his second term in 1713.

In the year of Union (1707) he undertook a census of the city and the population was calculated at 12766. The average status was assessed as "very moderate and frugal cast".

Due to a strong reading of the new rules and regulations of elections introduced in 1707 he was elected Member of Parliament for Glasgow Burghs in 1708 and served two years in this position, representing the Whig party and an ardent supporter of the English government. In the London Parliament he spoke against the fishing quotas in February 1709 and against the Royal African Company in March 1709. He did not seek re-election in 1710 and his seat was filled by Thomas Smith II who was his rival for provostship in 1711.

At this time the journey to London was done at the expense of the individual and could be very costly. This was possibly the reason that Rodger stood down in the role.

He died around 1720 and was buried in his family burial plot at Blackfriars (better now known as the Ramshorn Cemetery).

== Family ==
In 1680 he married Margaret Caldwell daughter of John Caldwell, a Glasgow merchant.

He was uncle of Hugh Rodger, Lord Provost 1732–34.
