= John Blackie =

Lord Provost of Glasgow
- In office 1863–1866
- Preceded by: Peter Clouston
- Succeeded by: Sir James Lumsden

Councillor, Glasgow Town Council
- In office 1857–1866

Personal details
- Born: 1805
- Died: 1873
- Political party: Liberal Party

John Blackie LLD DL (1805–1873) was a 19th-century Scottish publisher and the "son" of Blackie & Son who served as Lord Provost of Glasgow from 1863 to 1866.

The company specialised in printing annotated bibles and religious works including Scotland's first religious newspaper, the Scottish Guardian, established in 1832.

== Life ==
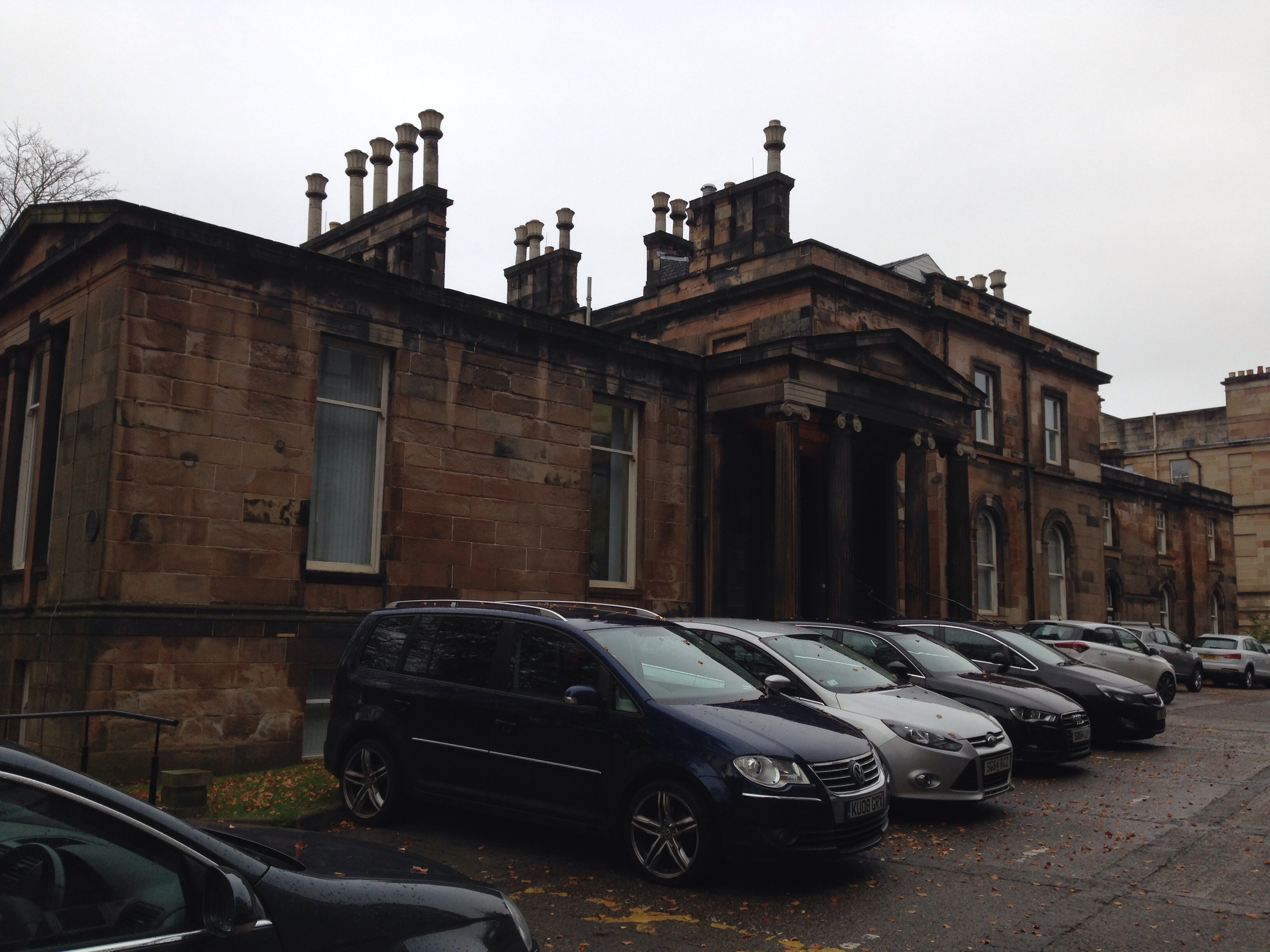
Lilybank House in Glasgow

He was born near Glasgow on 27 September 1805 the eldest of eight children of John Blackie (1782-1874) and his wife, Catherine Duncan. He was educated at William Angus's English School on Ingram Street then at the Glasgow High School.

Around 1830 the family moved to Glasgow where his father was partner in Blackie, Fullarton & Co at 8 East Clyde Street on the north side of the River Clyde. The family then lived at 18 Monteith Row. In 1831 following the death of Fullarton the company renamed as Blackie & Son but still operated from 8 Clyde Street. In 1837 a sister company was set up by John's younger brother, Walter Graham Blackie (1816-1906), and named W. G. Blackie & Co, which existed concurrently with but separate from Blackie & Son.

In 1857 Blackie joined Glasgow town council as a Liberal councillor. He became burgh magistrate in 1859. In 1863 he was elected Lord Provost and served for three years, succeeding to Peter Clouston. His main achievement in this role was in the instigation and implementation of Glasgow Improvements Act 1866 (29 & 30 Vict. c. lxxxv) which began a programme of slum clearance and rebuilding. A fresh water supply from Loch Katrine was also agreed and implemented.

John died of pleurisy on 12 February 1873 at his home Lilybank House in the Hillhead district.

At the death of John Blackie senior in 1874 (outliving his son) the company passed to various of his grandsons and the company was rebranded as Blackie & Co Ltd.

== Family ==
In 1849 he married Agnes Gourlay daughter of William Gourlay, a Glasgow merchant of 8 South Frederick Street.

They had three sons who later rebranded the company as Blackie & Co.

== Artistic recognition ==
Blackie's photograph, by David Octavius Hill is held by the Scottish National Portrait Gallery.
