= John Hamilton (Lord Provost) =

Lord Provost of Glasgow

John Hamilton of Northpark (1754–1829) was an 18th/19th century Scottish merchant who served three times as Lord Provost of Glasgow.

== Life ==
He was born in Glasgow on 17 June 1754 the son of Rev John Hamilton minister of St Mungo's Parish (now better known as Glasgow Cathedral, and his second wife, Mary Bogle daughter of John Bogle of Hamilton Farm.

In 1787 he was a joint founder of the Glasgow Golf Club.

By 1790 he was a successful Glasgow merchant dealing in sugar, rum and wine. He owned several plantations in Jamaica. As a trader in Glasgow he was nicknamed "Johnnie Sma' Bottles" as he specialised in half bottles of spirits.

As he became Chief Magistrate of Glasgow around 1790 he presumably had trained in Scots Law. Around this same time, with the expansion of the city, Great Hamilton Street (a new access on the east side) was named in his honour.

In 1799 he bought the Northpark (North Park) estate on the north side of the city centre.

From 1793 to 1799 he was a Bailie of the city. In 1800 he served his first term as Lord Provost of Glasgow succeeding Lawrence Craigie and served the standard two years in office before Craigie retook the position. He succeeded Craigie for a second term 1804 to 1806 and after two other Lord Provosts served a third term from 1810 to 1812 the role then passing to Kirkman Finlay. He was Treasurer of the city in 1807 and Lord Dean of Guild 1808/9.

He died in Glasgow in 1829.

William Hamilton inherited North Park House and it was demolished and redeveloped in 1869 soon after William's death.

== Family ==
He married his cousin, Helen Bogle (d.1825), daughter of Archibald Bogle of Shettleston. Helen's brother Robert Bogle, operated the Glasgow firm of Bogle & Co. and donated the lands upon which the current Glasgow University was built.

- John Hamilton, died in Jamaica
- Archibald Hamilton took over the Glasgow business with his younger brother William
- George William Hamilton (1786-1857)
- Robert Hamilton (d.1840) London merchant
- William Hamilton of Northpark (1790-1866) Lord Provost of Glasgow from 1826 to 1828
- Mary Hamilton (1797-1873) married Rev David Welsh of Edinburgh Moderator of the General Assembly of the Church of Scotland in 1842

== Artistic recognition ==
He was portrayed by Sir Henry Raeburn.
