= Robert Craigie =

Robert Craigie may refer to:

- Robert Craigie, Lord Glendoick (1688–1760), Scottish politician and judge
- Robert Craigie, Lord Craigie (1754–1834), Scottish lawyer and judge
- Robert Craigie (Royal Navy officer) (1800–1873)
- Sir Robert Craigie (diplomat) (1883–1959), British ambassador
- Robert William Craigie (1849–1911), Royal Navy officer

== See also ==
- Robert Craigie Cross (1911–2000), professor of logic and vice principal of Aberdeen University
