= Walter Stewart (bishop) =

Scottish clergyman

Walter Stewart (c.1568–1635) was a prominent Scottish clergyman in post-Reformation Scotland who served as Protestant Archbishop of Glasgow from 1587 to 1598.

== Life ==
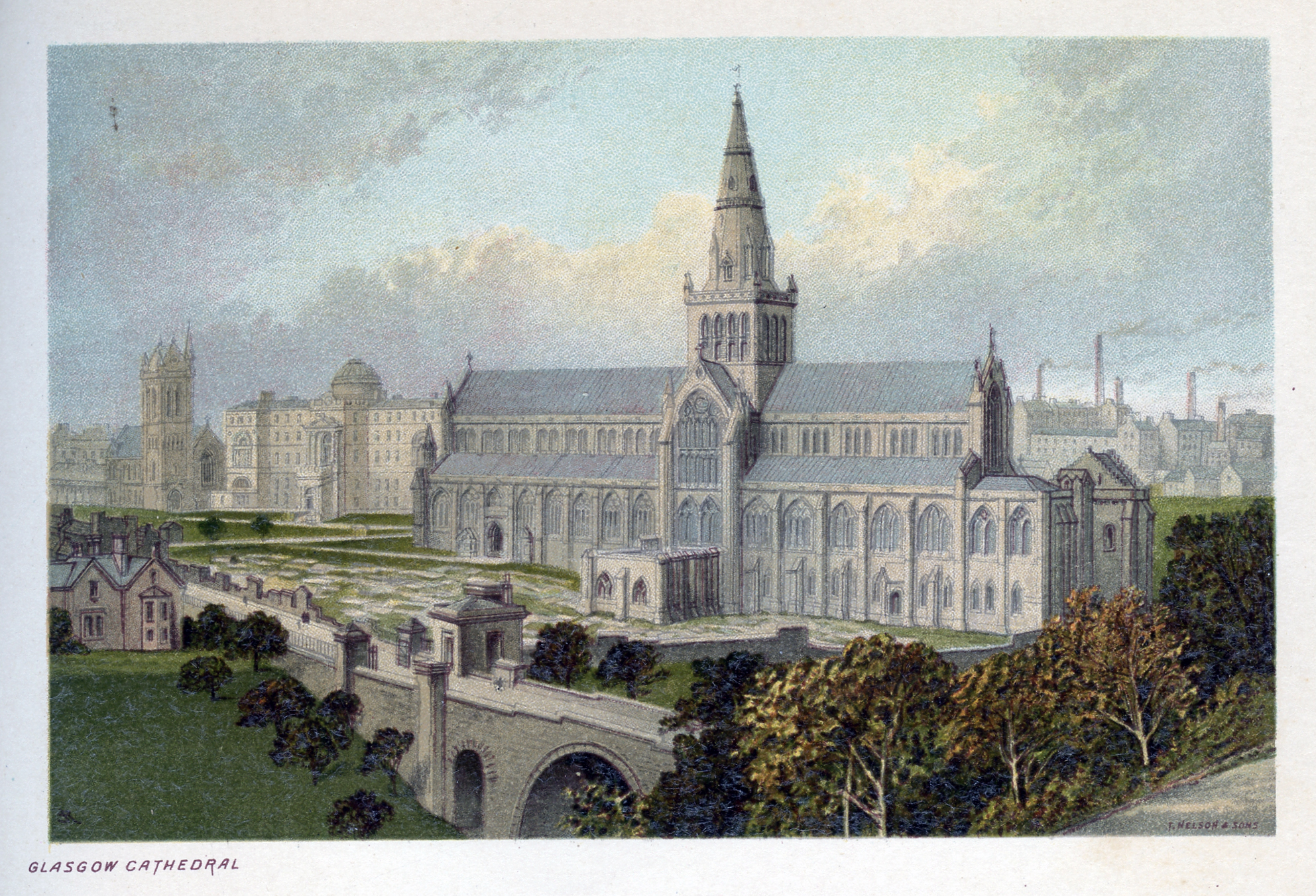
Glasgow Cathedral

He was the son of Matthew Stewart of Barscube (near Paisley) and Minto. His uncle, John Stewart of Minto, was Lord Provost of Glasgow. Walter studied at Glasgow University graduating MA in 1584. In 1587 he was presented to the parish of Old Kilpatrick under patronage of King James VI. He was also appointed Commendator of Blantyre.

He was Archbishop of Glasgow from 1587 to 1598 also being given "Lordship of Glasgow" by the King. He was succeeded by the elderly James Beaton.

He was Chancellor of Glasgow University 1587 to 1589.

On several occasions, under his title of Lord of Glasgow, he made his elder brother, Matthew Stewart of Minto, Lord Provost of Glasgow.

In 1606 he was made Constant Moderator of the Presbytery of the Church of Scotland in the absence of John Blackburn of Cardross. He was a member of the Court of High Commission in both 1610 and 1634. He died in March 1635. He is buried in Glasgow Cathedral.

== Family ==
He married firstly Katherine Inglis, sister of Thomas Inglis of Paisley. Their daughter Margaret married James Lennox of Woodhead. Katherine died in 1610/11. He then married Eupham Lindsay (d.1622) and had a son, Walter, and two daughters, Jean and Mary. He thirdly married Agnes Boyd, who outlived him.
