= Henry Dunlop of Craigton =

Scottish cotton manufacturer and merchant

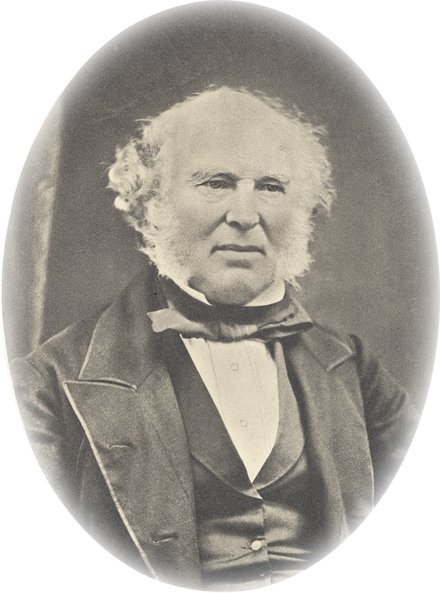
Henry Dunlop of Craigton

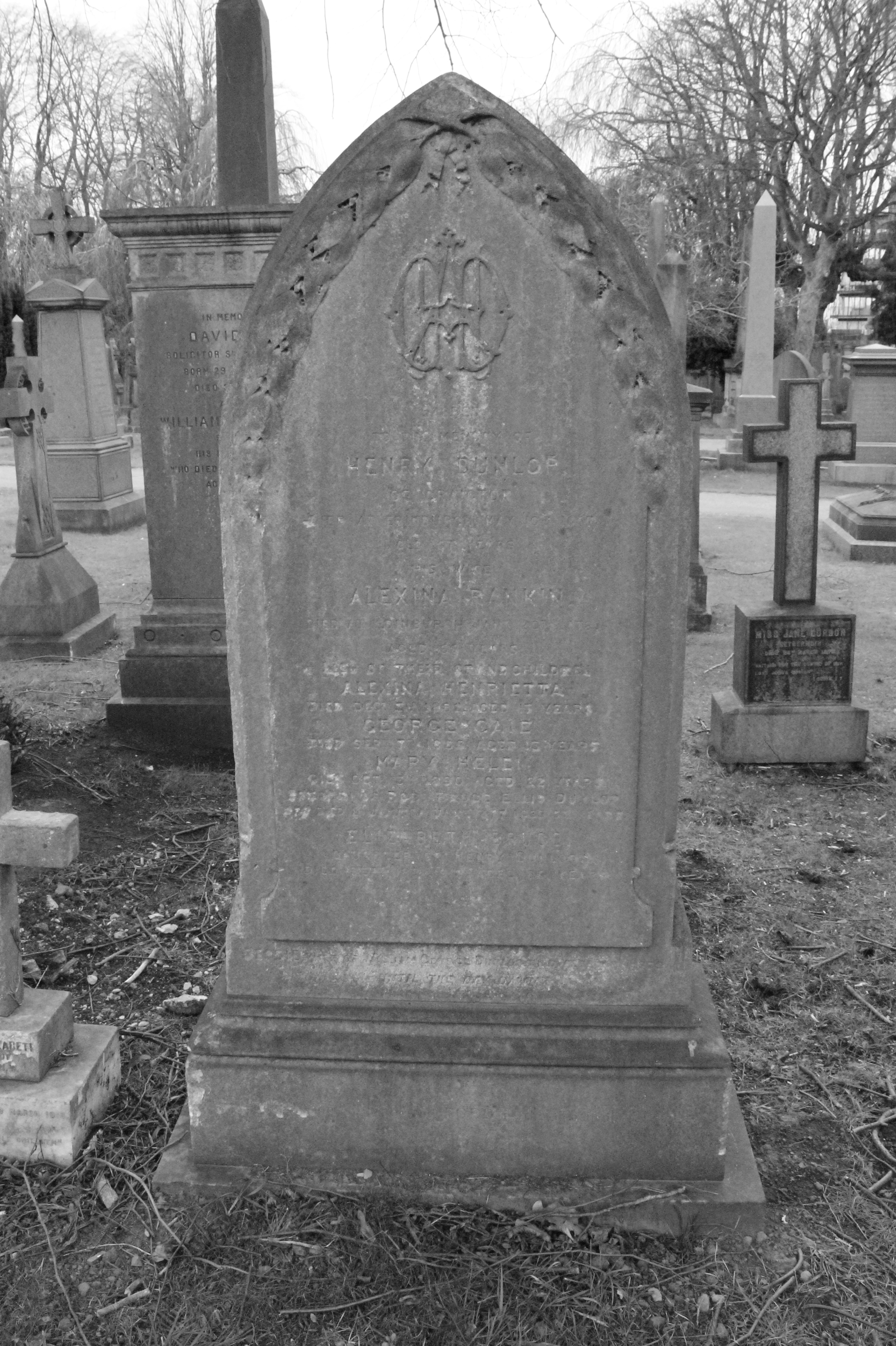
The grave of Alexina, widow of Henry Dunlop of Craigton, Dean Cemetery

Henry Dunlop of Craigton FRSE DL (1799–1867) was a Scottish cotton manufacturer and merchant who served as Lord Provost of Glasgow from 1837 to 1840.

== Life ==
He was born on 7 June 1799 in Kilbarchan in Renfrewshire the third son of James Dunlop of Linwood (1762–1826) and his wife, Bruce Alice (sic) (1769–1855), daughter of Rev James Alice of Paisley. He joined the family firm of James Miller & Sons (one of the oldest cotton firms in Scotland) around 1813. He was educated at Glasgow High School and spent some time at Glasgow University (without graduating). In 1829 he purchased the estate of Craigton in south-west Glasgow.

He was a leading member of the Glasgow Chamber of Commerce from 1830 until death.

He was elected Lord Provost of Glasgow in 1837 aged only 37, one of the city's youngest Lord Provosts. During his period in office he lived at 86 Miller Street in Glasgow. His was a bitterly contested election which had to be settled by the House of Lords.

In the Disruption of 1843 in the Church of Scotland he played a leading role in the political guidance upon the religious schism.

In 1854 he was elected a Fellow of the Royal Society of Edinburgh his proposer being John Learmonth his counterpart, being the former Lord Provost of Edinburgh.

He was later Vice Chairman of the Edinburgh and Glasgow Railway and remained Vice Chairman when it amalgamated to create the far larger North British Railway. He sold Craigton House to a merchant, Graham Hutchison, several years prior to his death.

He died during a visit to Edinburgh on 10 May 1867 from a "painful internal complaint." His widow moved to Edinburgh where she died on 20 January 1872.

== Family ==
He married twice, firstly in 1826 to Ann Cairnie (1800–1829) by whom he had two children Margaret Ann Dunlop (who died in childhood) and James Dunlop (1828–1898). Secondly in 1831 he married Alexina Rankin from Greenock (1804–1872) by whom he had ten further children.

== Artistic recognition ==
He was photographed several times by David Octavius Hill.
