= William McDowall =

Scottish politician (c.1749–1810)

William McDowall (c. 1749 – 3 April 1810) of Garthland and Castle Semple was a Scottish Member of Parliament.

== Life ==
He was the eldest son of William McDowall, Member of Parliament for Renfrewshire from 1768 to 1774, and Elizabeth Graham. His youngest brother, David McDowall-Grant, was also briefly a Member of Parliament for Banffshire.

He was educated at Glasgow University, matriculating in 1761, and admitted as an advocate in 1771.

He sat as Member of Parliament for Renfrewshire from 1783 until 1786, for Ayrshire from 1789 until 1790, for Glasgow Burghs from 1790 to 1802, and again for Renfrewshire from 1802 until 1810.

He owned property in Grenada and St Kitts as well as extensive lands in west-central Scotland which he bequeathed in trust to his nephew William McDowall (1770–1840), son of his brother James.

He was a partner in the firm of Alexander Houston & Co., a major Glasgow firm trading in the West Indies, which failed in 1801.

He was Lord Lieutenant of Renfrewshire from 1794 until his death, and Rector of Glasgow University from 1795 to 1797.

== Family ==
His younger brother James McDowall was twice Lord Provost of Glasgow.

Parliament of Great Britain
Preceded by John Shaw-Stewart	Member of Parliament for Renfrewshire; 1783–1786	Succeeded by John Shaw-Stewart
Parliament of Great Britain
Preceded by Hugh Montgomerie	Member of Parliament for Ayrshire; 1789–1790	Succeeded by Sir Adam Fergusson
Parliament of Great Britain
Preceded by John Craufurd	Member of Parliament for Glasgow Burghs; 1790–1802	Succeeded by Alexander Houstoun
Parliament of the United Kingdom
Preceded by Boyd Alexander	Member of Parliament for Renfrewshire; 1802–1810	Succeeded by Archibald Speirs
