= John Colin Dunlop =

Scottish advocate and historian

John Colin Dunlop FRSE (1785–1842) was a Scottish advocate and historian.

== Life ==
He was born near Glasgow on 30 December 1785 the son of John Dunlop, of Rosebank, Glasgow, who was Lord Provost of Glasgow, 1794–1796.

John Colin was studious and reclusive. He was admitted to the Faculty of Advocates in 1807 in 1807, but was only nominally at the Scottish bar. He became sheriff-depute of Renfrewshire in 1816 and served this role until his death.

He worked with the firm of Dunlop Rowand & Co at 63 St Vincent Street in central Glasgow.

He was elected a Fellow of the Royal Society of Edinburgh in 1833 his proposers being Alexander Maconochie, Lord Meadowbank and Sir Thomas Dick Lauder.

In later life he lived at 12 India Street in Edinburgh's Second New Town.

He died in Edinburgh on 26 January 1842.

== Works ==
Dunlop wrote:

- History of Fiction (Edinburgh, 1814, other editions 1816 and 1845). Another edition (1888) was edited by Henry Wilson; and there was a German translation as John Dunlop's Geschichte der Prosadichtungen (1851), by Felix Liebrecht.
- History of Roman Literature, from its Earliest Period to the Augustan Age, first volumes 1823, to 1828.
- Memoirs of Spain during the Reigns of Philip IV. and Charles II. (1834). This filled the gap between existing histories, supplementing Robert Watson and William Thomson's Philip II and III, and William Coxe's Memoirs of the Kings of Spain of the House of Bourbon.
- Translations from the Latin Anthology (1838), accused of plagiarism in Blackwood's Magazine when it appeared.
