= Peter Murdoch of Rosehill =

Scottish sugar merchant and refiner

Peter Murdoch of Rosehill (1670–1761) was an 18th-century Scottish sugar merchant and refiner who served as Lord Provost of Glasgow from 1730 to 1732.

== Life ==
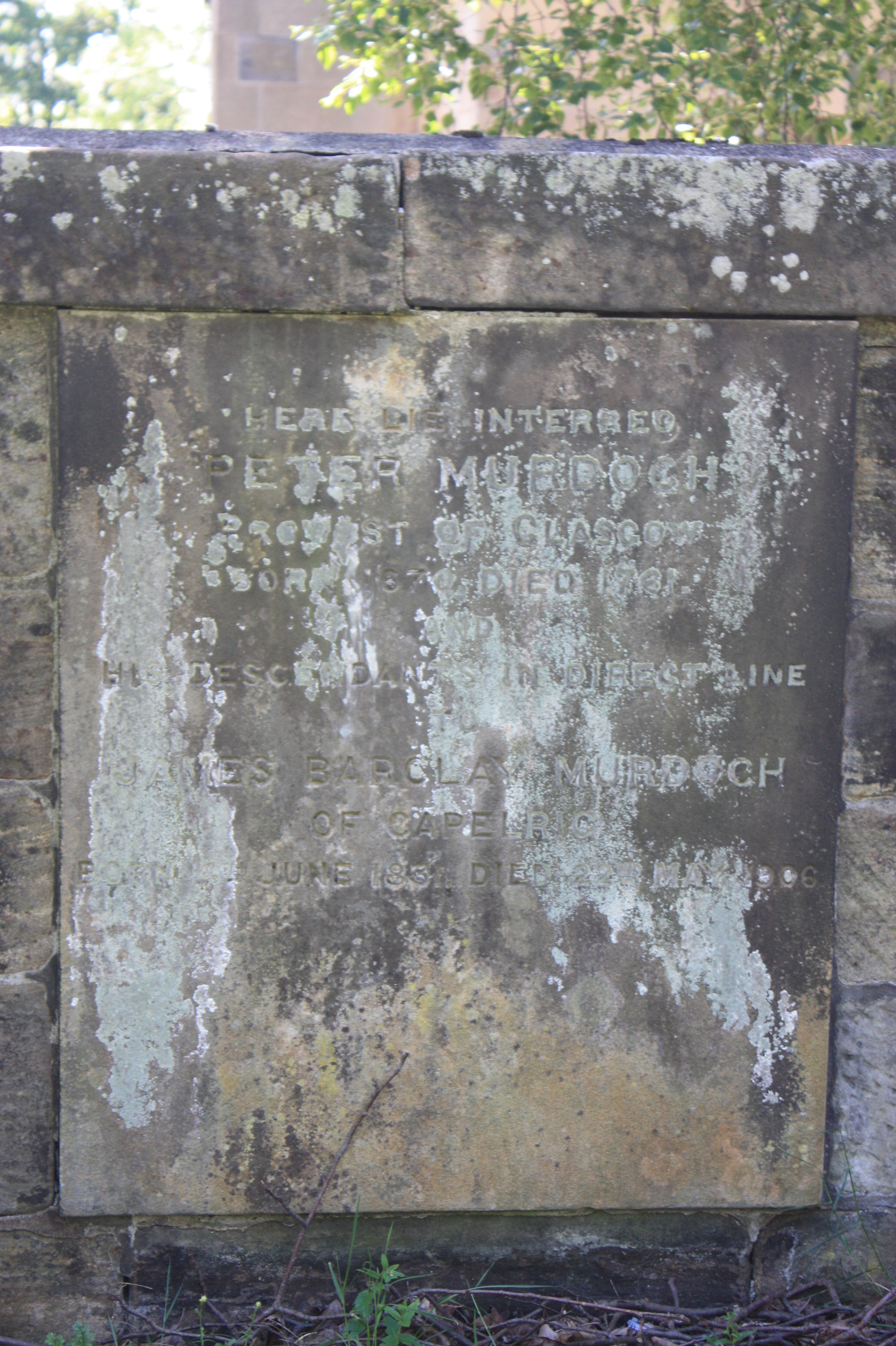
The grave of Peter Murdoch, Glasgow Cathedral burial ground

He was born in Glasgow in 1670, the son of Patrick Murdoch (1627–1681) and his wife, Margaret Gemmill.

He was owner of the King Street Sugar Works in Glasgow. This was probably built by his father around 1660/1670 and was one of the first sugar-houses in Scotland. It was financially damaged from 1707 onwards when the Treaty of Union started taxing sugar.

In 1711 he joined Glasgow Town Council as a Bailie. In 1730 he succeeded John Stirling as Lord Provost of Glasgow and was himself succeeded by Hugh Rodger in 1732.

Peter Murdoch died in 1761. He is buried against the south wall of Glasgow Cathedral burial ground.

In 1765 the bulk of sugar interests transferred from Glasgow to Greenock.

== Family ==
His brother Zacrie Murdoch married Elizabeth Rodger, daughter of Robert Rodger, Lord Provost in 1707 and 1712.

In 1696 he was married to Mary Luke of Claythorn, daughter of John Luke of Claythorn.

His eldest son, Peter Murdoch (1704-1734) died young. His son, also Peter Murdoch (1734-1817) was born just after his death. Peter Murdoch (b.1795), the original Peter's great grandson, served at the Battle of Waterloo.

He was father to John Murdoch of Rosebank, three times Lord Provost of Glasgow.

His daughter Janet Murdoch married Andrew Cochrane of Brighouse, also three times Lord Provost.

His daughter Martha Murdoch married Archibald Buchanan, 1st Baronet of Auchentorlie. They lived at Hillington House in Renfrewshire.

He is thought to be uncle to George Murdoch Lord Provost from 1754 to 1756 and from 1766 to 1768.
