= Andrew Cochrane =

Andrew Cochrane of Brighouse (1693 – 1777) was a Scottish merchant who served as Lord Provost of Glasgow three times, more than any other person: 1744/5, 1748/9, and 1760/1. Cochrane Street in central Glasgow was renamed in his honour in 1799; the street previously being known as Cotton Street.

== Life ==
He was born in Ayr in 1693 the son of David Cochrane.

He moved to Glasgow in 1722.

In 1723/4 he went into partnership with his brother-in-law John Murdoch (1709-1776) creating the Virginia trading company of Cochrane, Murdoch & Company.

In 1743 he founded the Political Economy Club whose members included Adam Smith.

In 1745 in his role as Lord Provost he had the arduous task of negotiating a levy on the town placed by Bonnie Prince Charlie to support the Jacobite cause, all the harder as Cochrane was a Hanoverian sympathiser. Whilst the ex Lord Provost Andrew Buchanan of Drumpellier (as part of the commission of people resolving the issue) negotiated a drop in the demanded levy from £15,000 to £5,500 the town nevertheless ended paying £14,000 to host the Young Pretender and his army. Cochrane was deeply upset by this and following the defeat of the Jacobite army at the Battle of Culloden he went to London with his brother-in-law George Murdoch (a Bailie and future Lord Provost) to lobby for compensation, eventually being successful the town received £10,000 in 1749.

In 1750 he was one of the first patrons of the odd bank, the Glasgow Tanwork Company (also known as Bell's Tanyards) which combined tanning and banking. It later became the Ship Bank.

In 1761 he was a joint founder (with 25 others) of the Glasgow Arms Bank and also became a partner in Bell's Tanyard which served the curious twin function of bank and tannery.

He died in Glasgow in 1777. A monument to his memory is in the nave of Glasgow Cathedral.

== Family ==
In 1723 he married Janet Murdoch (1699-1786), daughter of Peter Murdoch of Rosehill Lord Provost from 1730 to 1732, and sister of John Murdoch of Rosebank.

They had no children.

== Publications ==
The Maitland Club published the "Cochrane Correspondence", a series of his letters concerning governance of the city and council affairs.
