= John Stirling (Lord Provost) =

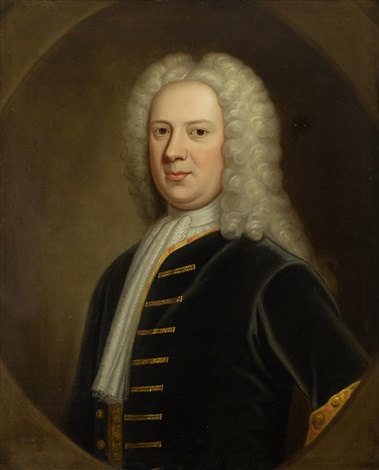

Lord Provost of Glasgow
- In office 1728–1730
- Succeeded by: Peter Murdoch of Rosehill

Baillie
- In office 1716, 1724

Personal details
- Born: 1677
- Died: 1736
- Spouse: Isabella Hunter
- Children: 6
- Occupation: merchant

John Stirling (1677–1736) was an early 18th-century Scottish merchant who served as Lord Provost of Glasgow from 1728 to 1730.

== Life ==
As a merchant he traded with Virginia and the Caribbean so is presumed to have traded in tobacco and sugar but there is no mention of his owning any plantations there.

He served as Baillie in 1716 and 1724 and was elected Lord Provost of Glasgow in 1728 being succeeded by Peter Murdoch of Rosehill in 1730.

He died in Glasgow in 1736.

== Family ==
He married Isabella Hunter. Their children included William Stirling (b.1717), founder of William Stirling & Sons calico printers. He was uncle to Walter Stirling founder of the Stirling Library in Glasgow. His daughter Janet Stirling married the Glasgow goldsmith Robert Luke.

== Artistic recognition ==
He was portrayed by William Aikman around 1720.
