= Cochrane Street, Glasgow =

Street in Glasgow, Scotland

Coordinates: 55°51′37.2″N 4°14′48.6″W

Cochrane Street
- Interactive map of Cochrane Street
- Type: Commercial
- Maintained by: Glasgow City Council
- Length: 0.135 mi (0.217 km)
- Location: Glasgow
- Postal code: G1
- Nearest Glasgow Subway station: St. Enoch's

Cochrane Street is a major thoroughfare in the city of Glasgow, the largest city in Scotland. The street runs east from the junction of George Square and South Frederick Street through the Merchant City until it meets Montrose Street.

== History ==
The street was originally known as Cotton Street, as known from an advertisement in a Glasgow paper in 1789. The street was opened in 1787 and evidently ran a shorter length from South Frederick Street to John Street.

== Re-naming of the street ==
The street was originally planned to be extended as Cross Street in 1799 - the extension ran from John Street to Montrose Street.

However the whole street - Cotton Street and the extended Cross Street - was instead named together as one street - Cochrane Street - in honour of Andrew Cochrane, the Tobacco Lord and former Lord Provost of Glasgow.
