= George Murdoch (disambiguation) =

George Murdoch (1850–1910) was a Canadian politician and mayor of Calgary, Alberta.

George Murdoch may also refer to:

- George Murdoch (Lord Provost) (1715–1795), Lord Provost of Glasgow
- Tyrus (wrestler) (born 1973), the pseudonym of professional wrestler George Murdoch
- George Murdoch (murder victim) (1924/1925–1983), Scottish taxi driver and victim of the "Cheese Wire Murder"

== See also ==
- George Murdock (1897–1985), American anthropologist
- George Murdock (actor) (1930–2012), American actor
