= John Murdoch of Rosebank =

Scottish tobacco lord

John Murdoch of Rosebank (1709–1776) was a Scottish tobacco lord and politician who served as Lord Provost of Glasgow three times: 1746–1748, 1750–1752 and 1758–1760, with his brother-in-law Andrew Cochrane serving in the intervening years. Murdoch Avenue in Cambuslang is named after him.

== Life ==
John Murdoch was born on 4 October 1709 the son of Peter Murdoch of Rosehill (1670-1761), a Glasgow merchant and sugar refiner (owner of the King Street Sugar Works) who later served as Lord Provost of Glasgow (1730-1732), and his wife, Mary Luke, daughter of John Luke of Claythorn.

He lived at Rosebank House in the Cambuslang district.

In 1744 he became a Bailie in Glasgow Town Council (under Andrew Cochrane) and two years later succeeded him as Lord Provost.

In 1750 he built the first house on Argyle Street (standing on the corner of Dunlop Street) and long-known as the Buck's Head Inn.

He died in Glasgow on 30 June 1776.

Rosebank House passed to John Dunlop who himself became Lord Provost in 1794 and in 1801 was purchased by David Dale. The house was demolished in 1937.

== Family ==
His sister, Janet Murdoch, married Andrew Cochrane.

In 1732 he was married to Margaret Lang, daughter of William Lang. Their only child, Ann Murdoch, who married John Wallace of Cessnock but died before 1754.

Margaret Lang died in 1734 (possibly in childbirth) and John then married Margaret Bogle by whom he had one further daughter, Margaret Murdoch, who married Thomas Miller, Lord Glenlee. Their daughter Jessy married John Dunlop of Rosebank.
