= John Craigie (politician) =

Canadian politician

John Craigie (ca. 1757 – November 26, 1813) was a businessman and political figure in colonial Quebec and Lower Canada.

== Life ==
Born in Scotland circa 1757, he was the third son of John Craigie, of Kilgraston in the Ochil Hills, by his cousin and wife Anne Craigie, daughter of President Craigie. His grandfather, Lawrence, was a Baron of the Exchequer and the brother of Robert Craigie, Lord President of the Court of Session.

Craigie came to Quebec in 1781 as deputy Commissary-General for the British Army there. Craigie was named commissary general in 1784. The following year, he became private secretary to Lieutenant Governor Henry Hope. In 1793, he helped found the Batiscan Iron Work Company. Craigie represented Buckingham in the Legislative Assembly of Lower Canada from 1796 to 1804. In 1801, Craigie was named to the Executive Council. He was dismissed as commissary general in 1808 for misappropriation of funds, but retained his seat on the Executive Council.

He died at Quebec City in 1813.

== Family ==
In 1792, he had married Susannah, the daughter of John Coffin (1729-1808), and widow of James Grant, Esq. Their eldest son, John Craigie, Esq., advocate, sheriff-substitute of Roxburghshire, became the representative of the Craigies of Kilgraston. His daughter, Susannah, married George Hamilton, and his step-daughter, Isabella, married Benjamin Joseph Frobisher. His second son (born 1800) was Rear Admiral Robert Craigie RN.

His brothers included Lawrence Craigie twice Lord Provost of Glasgow and Robert Craigie, Lord Craigie a Senator of the College of Justice.
