= John Aird (Lord Provost) =

Lord Provost of Glasgow

John Aird (John Aird Junior) (1655–1730) was a Scottish merchant who served as Lord Provost of Glasgow five times (ten years in total).

== Life ==
Aird was born in 1655, the son of John Aird.

In 1692 Aird appears as a Bailie in Glasgow Town Council and from 1695 he appears as Dean of Guild in the Council. He served as Dean five times in total up to 1721. He served as Lord Provost five times: 1705–1707, 1709–1711, 1713–1715, 1717–1719 and 1721–1723.

In the Jacobite Rebellion of 1715 Aird and the city sided strongly with the new government, rather than the Jacobite "rebels", and Aird raised an army of 600 volunteers to defend the city against Jacobite capture.

Aird lived in a mansion house on Aird's Lane (now called Goosedubbs). One of his main trades appears to have been in selling geese.

Aird died in Glasgow in 1730.

== Artistic recognition ==
Aird's portrait in frock-coat and wig is held in the Merchant's House on George Square in Glasgow.
