= Andrew Galbraith =

Scottish businessman (1799–1885)

Andrew Galbraith (1799–1885) was a 19th-century Scottish businessman who served as Lord Provost of Glasgow from 1857 to 1860.

== Life ==
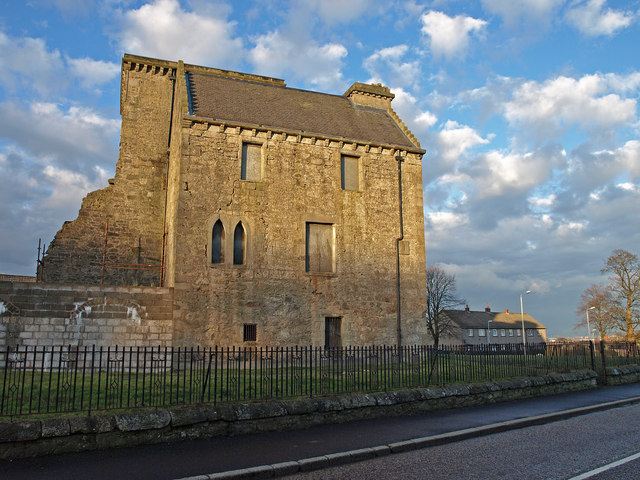
Johnstone Castle, Renfrewshire

He was born in Campbeltown on 6 February 1799.

Together with his younger brother Archibald Galbraith they ran A & A Galbraith, cotton spinners in Glasgow. The business had offices at 4 Bothwell Street and factories on Garngad Road. Later he also had mills at Oakbank near Glasgow. His mills employed 1200 persons.

He joined Glasgow town council in the 1840s and served as Dean of Guild from 1848 to 1850. He was elected Lord Provost of Glasgow in 1857. At this time he lived at 153 St Georges Road in Glasgow.

He retired to Johnstone Castle in Renfrewshire.

He died at the castle on 29 November 1885 and was buried with his wife and daughters in the Glasgow Necropolis.

== Family ==
He was married to Margaret Bogle Scott (1807-1850) from Port Glasgow.

== Artistic recognition ==
He was portrayed in old age by Norman Macbeth.
