= Sir James King, 1st Baronet =

Scottish businessman

Sir James King, 1st Baronet FRSE
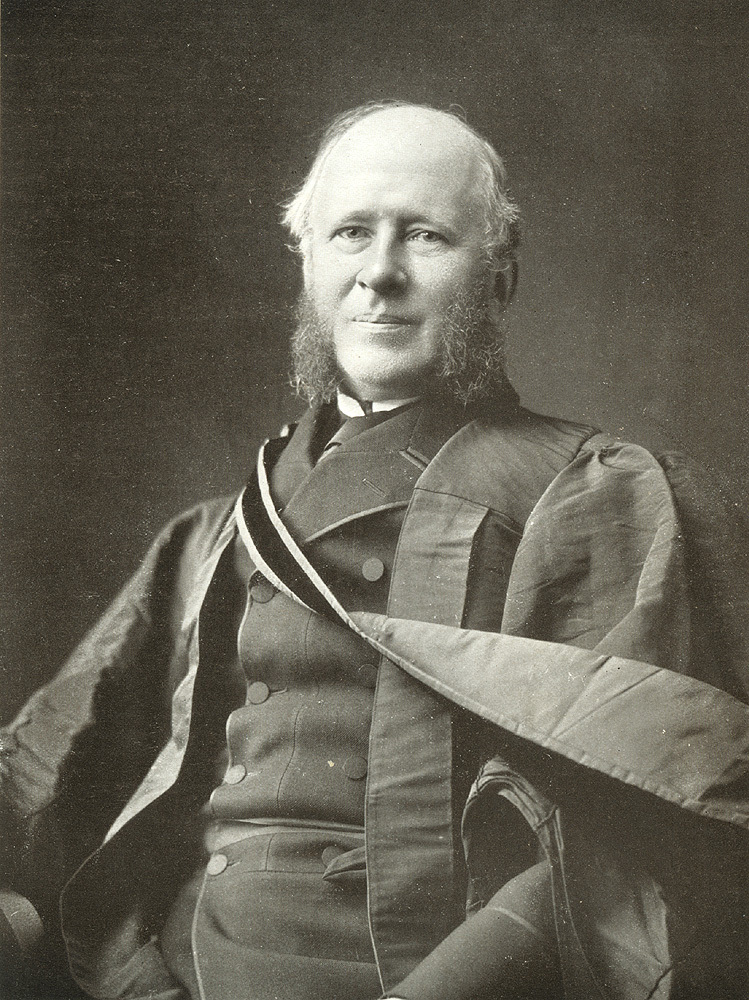

Lord Provost of Glasgow
- In office 1886–1889
- Preceded by: William McOnie
- Succeeded by: Sir John Muir, 1st Baronet

Personal details
- Born: 13 July 1830 Glasgow
- Died: 1 October 1911 (aged 81)
- Parents: William Collins (father); Jane Barclay (mother)

Sir James King, 1st Baronet, FRSE (13 July 1830 – 1 October 1911) was a Scottish businessman who served as Lord Provost of Glasgow 1886 to 1889. He was Director of the Clydesdale Bank for over forty years. He was also Chairman of the Caledonian Railway Company. His family motto was “Honos Industriae Praemium”.

== Life ==
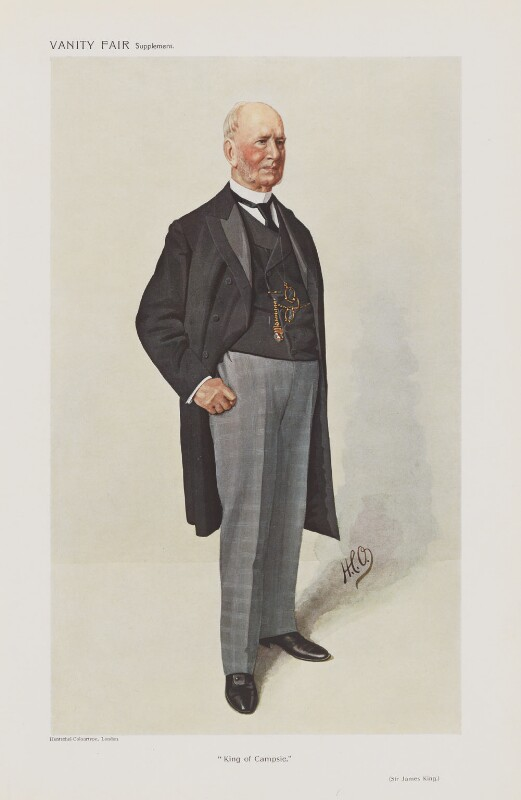
"King of Campsie", caricature by HCO in Vanity Fair, 1910.

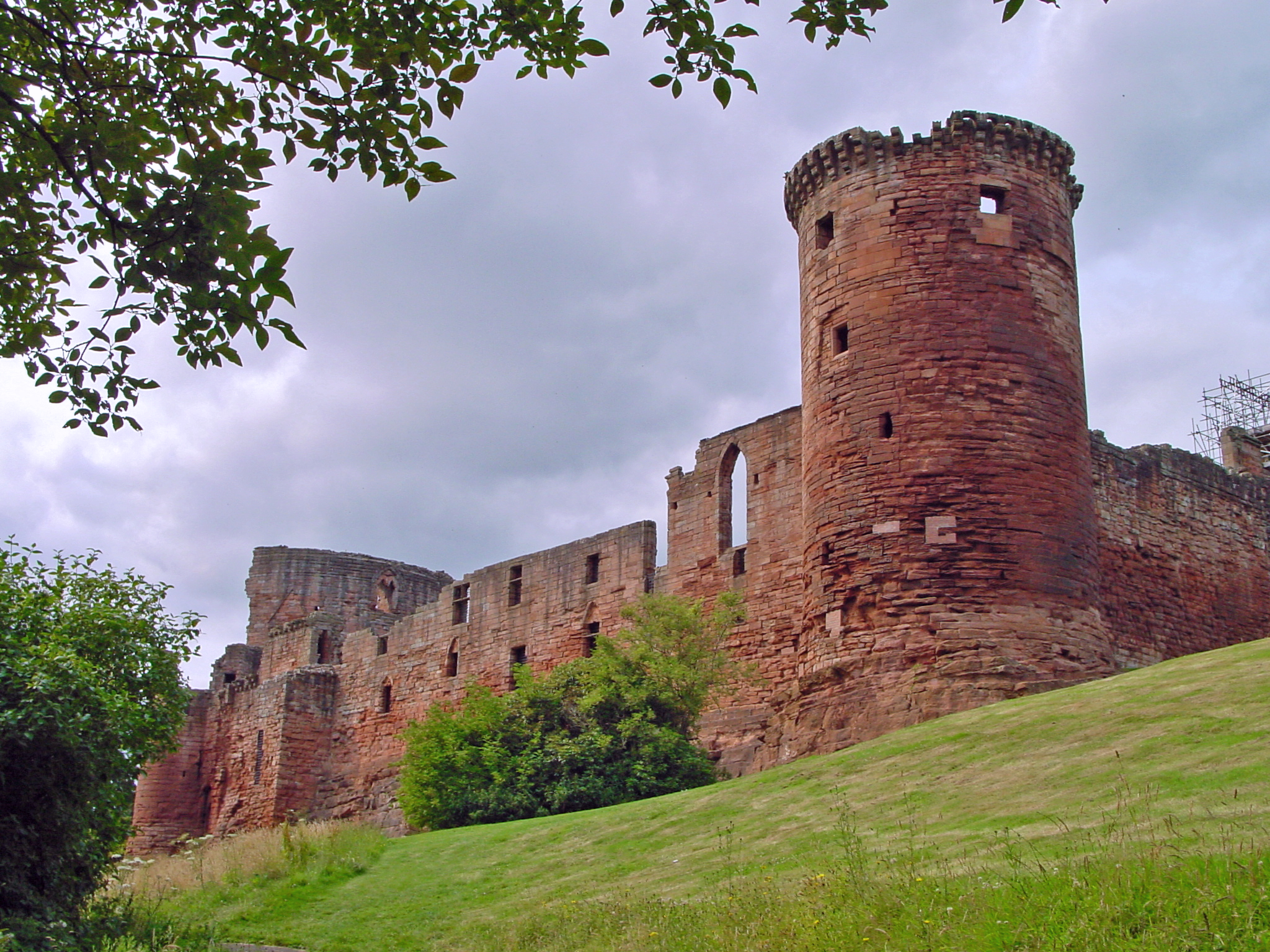
Bothwell Castle

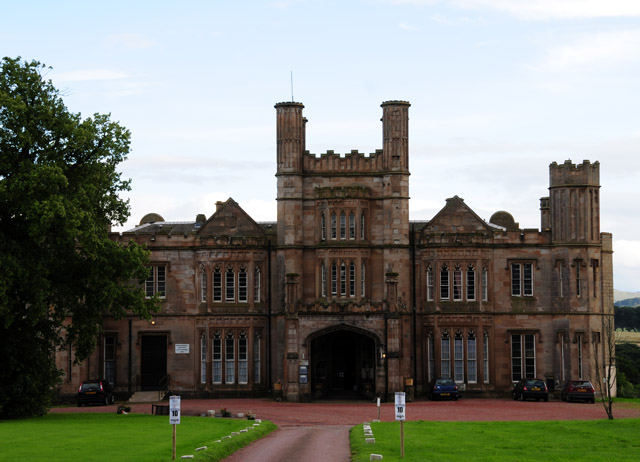
Carstairs House (renamed Monteith House)

He was born in Glasgow on 13 July 1830 the eldest of seven children to John King of Leverholme and Campsie, and his wife, Christina McNie. He attended Glasgow High school then Glasgow University before joining the family business of Hurlet & Campsie Alum Company, in their offices at 77 Union Street in Glasgow. The firm made various raw chemical products, including potash and alum.

He played a very active part in the life of Glasgow joining the Town Council in 1874 and being variously Dean of Guild, Chairman of the Glasgow Chamber of Commerce, Dean of Faculties at the University of Glasgow, and Chairman of the Clyde Navigation Trust. He was also Deputy Lieutenant and a Justice of the Peace for Lanarkshire.

In 1877, he was elected a Fellow of the Royal Society of Edinburgh. His proposers were William Thomson, Lord Kelvin, Sir Charles Wyville Thomson, Sir James David Marwick and James Bryce.

He was knighted by Queen Victoria in 1887 following her official visit to the city. In 1888 he oversaw the Glasgow International Exhibition in his role of Lord Provost. He was then raised to the rank of Baronet. In 1889 he served on the Royal Commission on the Highlands and Islands and was involved in paving the way for the Crofters Commission.

Through the 1880s and 1890s he rented the habitable sections of Bothwell Castle from the Earl of Home.

In 1910, he has two listed addresses: 115 Wellington Street in Glasgow and Carstairs House. Carstairs House was later renamed Monteith House in part due to the confusion and stigma for the similarly named Carstairs Hospital, a hospital once linked with the criminally insane, and itself now also renamed.

He died on 1 October 1911.

== Family ==
In 1861 he married Marian Westall, daughter of William Westall of Streatham Common. They had seven children two of which died in early infancy.

He was succeeded by John Westall King (1863-1940) 2nd Baronet. He in turn was succeeded by James Granville le Neve King, 3rd Baronet.

== Artistic recognition ==
His full-length portrait by Edward Arthur Walton (commissioned in 1889) is held by Glasgow Council.

The Clydesdale Bank commissioned a portrait by Sir George Reid.

In 1910 he was subject as one of the highly popular series of figures of the day in the magazine Vanity Fair. He appeared under the title of “King of Campsie”. The portrait is signed HCO.

Baronetage of the United Kingdom
New creation	Baronet (of Campsie); 1888–1911	Succeeded by John Westall King
