= Henry Monteith =

Scottish businessman and Tory politician (1764–1848)

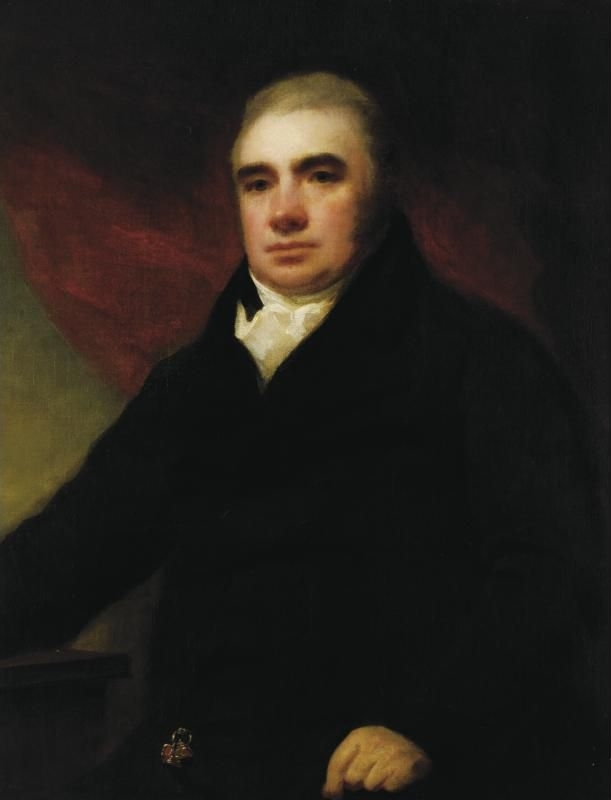
Portrait by Henry Raeburn

Henry Monteith of Carstairs (1764–1848) was a Scottish businessman and Tory politician who twice served as Lord Provost of Glasgow from 1814 to 1816 and 1818 to 1820, and as MP for Linlithgow 1820 to 1826 and 1830 to 1831.

== Life ==
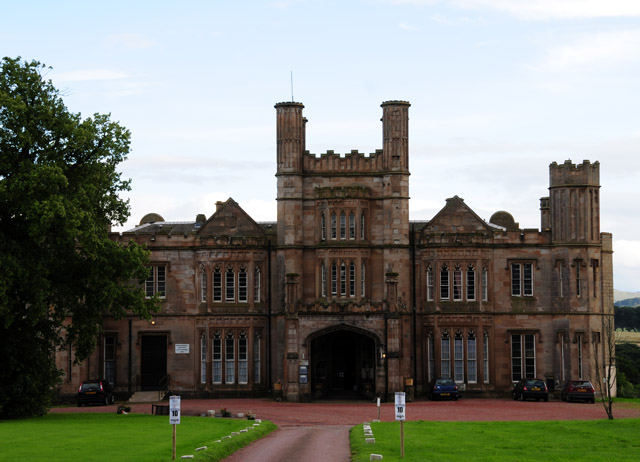
Carstairs House, now known as Monteith House

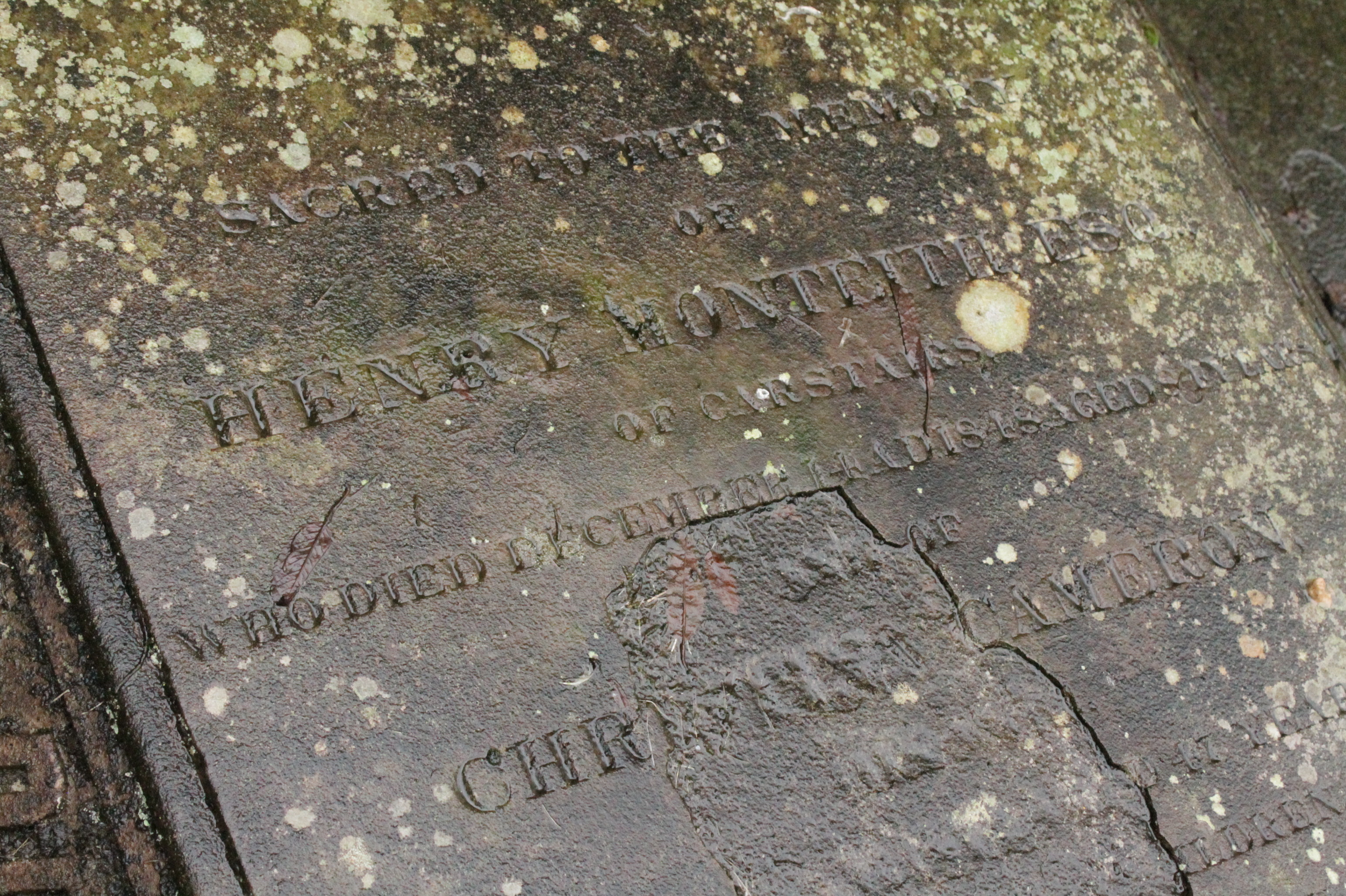
The grave of Henry Monteith, Ramshorn Cemetery

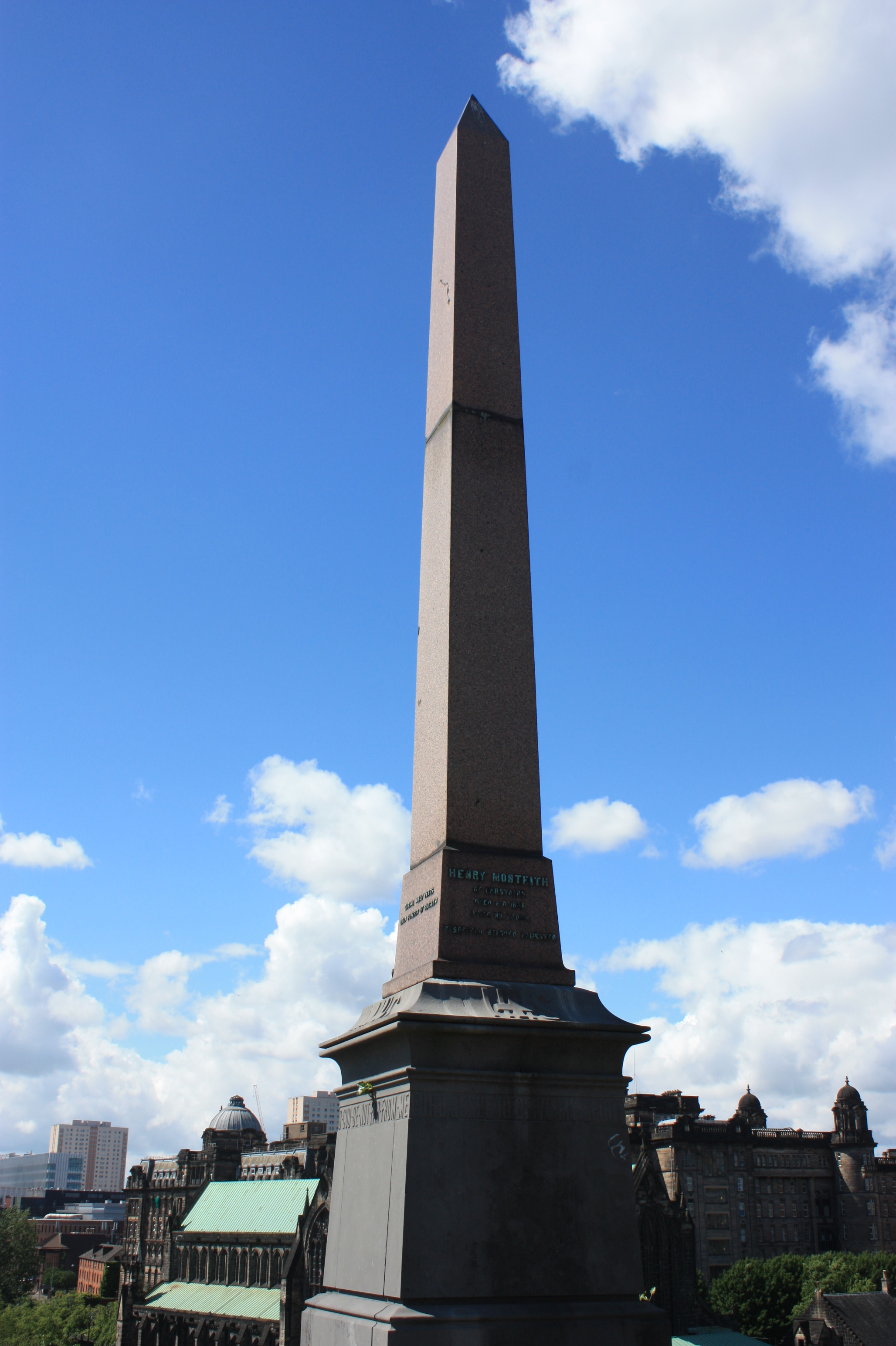
Memorial to Henry Monteith, Glasgow Necropolis

He was born the sixth son of James Monteith (b. 1734) a merchant-weaver making cambric on Bishop Street in the Anderston district of Glasgow, and his wife, Rebecca Thomson. His eldest brother, John Monteith, had Scotland's first steam-driven power loom factory in Pollokshaws. The family were originally from the Aberfoyle area and had fought off raids from Rob Roy.

He studied at Glasgow University graduating in 1776. Trained in the family weaving business he owned his own factory Henry Monteith & Company by 1785. In 1802 he opened a second factory making handkerchiefs in the Barrowfield district, and when James died later that year also took over his power loom factory in Pollokshaws. His workforce peaked in 1804 with a huge 6000 employees.

In May 1820 in his role as Lord Provost, he had to make provisions for the "Radical War" of the Scottish workforce, employing militia to counteract this insurrection. In the same capacity he oversaw the hanging of James Wilson on 30 August 1820 on the alleged charge of treason.

He was succeeded as Lord Provost by John Thomas Alston.

He lived at Westbank House on Renfrew Road in Glasgow. In 1820 he came to an arrangement with the Fullerton family (whose daughter he later married) to acquire their estate in Carstairs and commissioned William Burn to design a country seat for him, known as Carstairs House, which was completed 1823/4.

His most controversial parliamentary action was his involvement in the Jamaican slave trials of 1826.

He died at Carstairs House in December 1848. He is buried in the Ramshorn Cemetery in central Glasgow. The grave, flanked by short granite columns, lies on the west outer side of the central enclosure. He also has a very large memorial on the northern slope of the Glasgow Necropolis overlooking Glasgow Cathedral.

Carstairs House was bought by Sir James King, also a former Lord Provost of Glasgow, in 1899. It was renamed Monteith House in his memory on the late 20th century. Monteith Row in Glasgow was also named in his memory.

== Family ==
He was married twice: in 1788 to Christian Cameron and in 1826 to Sarah Fullerton of Carstairs.

He was father to Janet b. 1789, Rebecca b. 1790 d. 1868, Jean b. 1792, Christina b. 1792, Agnes b. 1799, Mary Henry b. 1801 d. 1878, Henry b. 1803, Robert b. 1804, John b. 1807, Catherine b. 1808, James b. 1809 d. 1809. Christina is the Mother of children listed. Henry also fathered Henry Monteith b. 1822 d. 1903 by Janet Hodge b. 1802. Henry and Janet never married, she is said to have been a member of staff at his home in Carstairs.

== Artistic recognition ==
He was portrayed by Sir Henry Raeburn.
