= Lawrence Craigie =

Scottish merchant

Lawrence Craigie (c. 1755–1840) was an 18th/19th century Scottish merchant and local politician who twice served as Lord Provost of Glasgow.

== Life ==
He was the eldest son of Laurence Craigie of Dumbarnie, son of Laurence Craigie of Kilgraston (a Baron of the Exchequer). He is listed as a merchant in Glasgow trading from the Counting House on Miller Street with lodgings on St Enoch Square in the late 18th century.

In 1787, he is listed as a member of the West India Club and as Secretary of Glasgow Golf Club. He was first elected Lord Provost in 1798, in succession to James McDowall. After two years in office he lost to a rival, John Hamilton, but returned to office two years later in 1802.

On 2 March 1803 he laid the foundation of the new theatre on Queen Street in Glasgow along with the architect David Hamilton. By 1810, he was living permanently at 8 St Enoch Square. In 1832 his address jumps to 21 St Enoch Square (but this may be due to renumbering). After his role of Lord Provost he was Tory Collector of Taxes (Cess Tax) for the City of Glasgow.

He retired around 1834 and went to live in Edinburgh, where he died on 11 September 1840.

== Family ==
He was married to Margaret Hall around 1780. Their eldest son appears at the visit of King George IV to Scotland in 1822, alongside John Thomas Alston as the then Lord Provost, as Laurence Craigie Jr. Their children included General Sir Patrick Edmonstone Craigie. Among his cousins were John Craigie and Robert Craigie, Lord Craigie (a Lord of Session and Senator of the College of Justice from 1811).
