= Walter Gibson (Lord Provost) =

Scottish merchant

Walter Gibson (c. 1635–1723) was a 17th century Scottish merchant who served as Lord Provost of Glasgow in 1688. He was joint owner of three ships including the Carolina Merchant which transported a group of Covenanters to Charleston in 1684.

== Life ==
He was the eldest son of John Gibson of Overnewton, a mansion in Glasgow.

Walter initially traded as a "maltster" (brewer) then operated a herring boat. He organised an interesting barter involving a Dutch ship which transported 3600 barrels of herring to France in exchange for 3600 barrels of brandy plus 3600 crowns. This lucrative deal set him on a new path. He began importing iron (the first importation in Scotland). He then invested in the "great company of Virginie and the Carribby Islands" (Virginia Company?) and began transatlantic trading. He operated three ships and mainly traded with Sweden and Spain. On at least one occasion he took Scottish settlers to America in 1683 (the East Jersey settlement?).

In July 1684, he was co-owner with his younger brother Baillie James Gibson of the ship Carolina Merchant moored at Gourock bay (see below).

Walter Gibson was the last Lord Provost to be chosen by the Bishop of Glasgow as this practice terminated with the Glorious Revolution of 1688. Under the revised system fellow Burgesses elected the Provost. Under this new system Gibson did not serve the standard two year term and was replaced by John Anderson III in February 1689.

Sadly Gibson fell on troubled times and his bankruptcy of 1691 not only ruined his reputation but resulted in his imprisonment. He died in relative poverty in 1723.

Gibson had built a large and very beautiful tenement (c.1680) on the Saltmarket in Glasgow centre, known as "Gibson's Land". It gave its name to the adjacent alley, Gibson's Wynd, which was later widened to create Princes Street. The building stood on an arcade with 18 columns and 17 arches and displayed the different architectural orders on each floor. By 1810 Gibson's Land was in a poor state of repair and was being used as a brothel. It was demolished and redeveloped in 1823.

== The ship Carolina Merchant ==
The Carolina Merchant was a 170 ton timber vessel carrying an armament of 16 cannon. It is said she was previously named the Pelican.

It had a far smaller 50-ton ship, the James, also owned by the Gibson brothers. This was hired by the Carolina Company in 1682 to transport goods and people from Irvine to Charleston, South Carolina vua Bermuda under command of Walter's brother, Captain James Gibson. This Carolina venture was disrupted by the involvement of two company members in the Rye House Plot of 1683.

When she sailed from Gourock Bay in July 1684 she contained 32 to 35 Covenanter prisoners and a woman "kidnapped" or under duress: Elizabeth Linning. She was captained by James Gibson, Walter's brother, and joint owner of the ship. The total number of passengers was 148. After a difficult journey the ship reached Charleston, South Carolina in October 1684. Not all the passengers were prisoners: Henry Erskine, 3rd Lord Cardross and Rev William Dunlop were on board with a group of over 100 emigrants and they established their own settlement called Stuart Town (near the now Beaufort, South Carolina). 31 of the emigrants were the servants and entourage of both Cardross and Dunlop. 14 were servants of William Gibson inferring he was also part of the settlement plan. The fourth gentleman on board was John Montgomerie of Crevock.

Only 49 settlers reached Stuart Town (and none of the Covenanters). Considering there to be a surfeit of servants a number were sold in Charleston (note- this is one of the few clear records of white persons being sold), but continued well into the 18th century (see Peter Williamson (Indian Peter)). Later that year Gibson's rival for government transportation, Robert Malloch, sailed 150 persons "he had been made a gift of" from Leith to the Americas on his ship the Alexander.

In 1684 either the Carolina Merchant or the James is the likely "Glasgow vessel" which transported David Toschach, Lord Minevard and his entourage plus 3 rebel prisoners (Covenanters) from Stirling on a voyage from Glasgow to East Jersey.

From 1684 Walter Gibson was advertising his transportation service in broadsheets.

== Family ==
Son John Gibson (c. 1666–1713)
