= Robert Craigie, Lord Craigie =

Scottish lawyer

Robert Craigie, Lord Craigie (1754–1834) was an 18th/19th century Scottish lawyer who rose to be a Lord of Session and Senator of the College of Justice.

== Life ==
He was born in Dunbarney House the second son of Anne Craigie and her husband and cousin, John Craigie of Kilgraston, son of Lawrence Craigie (a Baron of the Exchequer).

He trained as a lawyer and became an advocate in July 1776. He appears in Edinburgh around 1785 as an advocate living and working from Covenant Close (166 High Street) on the Royal Mile. In 1786 he was appointed as Sheriff Depute of Orkney and in 1791 as Sheriff of Dumfriesshire.

In 1800 he was living and working from 17 North Frederick Street in Edinburgh.

In 1811 he was elected a Senator of the College of Justice replacing William Baillie, Lord Polkemmet who had retired.

In 1814 he was living at 90 George Street in Edinburgh's New Town.

He died unmarried and childless at 90 George Street in Edinburgh in 1834. He is buried with his parents in the burial ground of Dunbarney just west of Bridge of Earn in Perthshire.

== Family ==
His great uncle was Robert Craigie, Lord Glendoick. His brothers were John Craigie and Lawrence Craigie, twice Lord Provost of Glasgow. His nephews included Rear Admiral Robert Craigie RN.
