= Matthew Stewart of Minto =

Matthew Stewart of Minto (c.1545 – c.1612) was a prominent Scottish merchant who was four times Lord Provost of Glasgow.

== Life ==
He was the son of John Stewart of Minto, Lord Provost of Glasgow from 1565 to 1573, and his first wife Joanna Hepburn. Many of his ancestors and uncles also served as Lord Provost. His uncle Walter Stewart was Archbishop of Glasgow.

In 1573 he purchased a tenement in the Drygate district of Glasgow.

He was a merchant and city burgess in Glasgow and was first elected Provost for the term 1581/2. He is one of the only people to have later served three consecutive terms in office: totalling from 1588 until 1599.

In 1588 he was created Justiar and Baillie of the Regality of Glasgow.

He died around 1612.

== Family ==
In 1569 he firstly married a cousin Jonet Stewart of Castlemilk. He secondly married Jean Colquhoun daughter of Sir John Colquhoun of Luss.

He had at least four children and was succeeded in his estates by Sir Walter Stewart of Minto, a son of his first marriage.

He was half-brother to Walter Stewart, 1st Lord Blantyre
