= Benjamin Joseph Frobisher =

Canadian merchant, militia officer and politician (1782–1821)

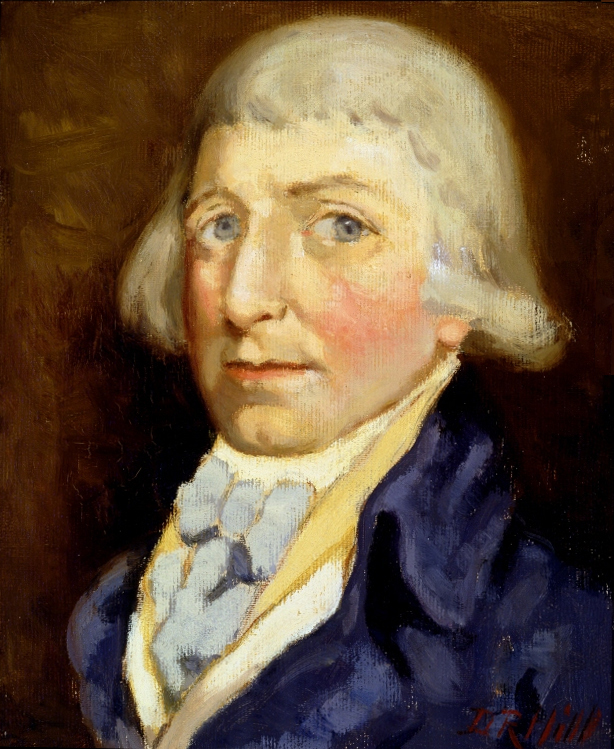
Portrait of Frobisher

Lieutenant-Colonel Benjamin Joseph Frobisher (26 March 1782 – 18 March 1821) was a Canadian merchant, militia officer and politician.

== Career ==
He was born in Montreal, the son of Joseph Frobisher, and studied in England. In 1799, he joined the North West Company and travelled west, becoming clerk in the English River department. He later worked as a clerk for a merchant in the fur trade at Quebec City. Frobisher represented Montreal County in the Legislative Assembly of Lower Canada from 1804 to 1808. He was named a justice of the peace for Trois-Rivières district in 1805. He served in the local militia, rising to the rank of lieutenant colonel. In 1815, he was named provincial aide-de-camp for colonial administrator Sir Gordon Drummond and, in 1816, for Governor Sir John Coape Sherbrooke.

In 1817, he led an attack by the North West Company against a Hudson's Bay Company fort at Île-à-la-Crosse, located in what is now Saskatchewan. In 1819, he was taken prisoner by the HBC and detained at York Factory. He later escaped and returned to Quebec.

== Family ==
In 1804, he married Isabella Grant, daughter of James Grant and Susannah Coffin. Mrs Frobisher was a niece of both The Rt. Hon. Sir William Grant and General Sir Roger Hale Sheaffe. After the death of her father, her mother had remarried The Hon. John Craigie. Benjamin Frobisher died at Quebec City in 1821. After his death his widow and their only son went to live in England at Barton House, Dawlish, the home of her aunt, the widow of Admiral John Schank, and two of Mrs. Frobisher's uncles, Sir William Grant, of Beldorney Castle, and Major John Grant (1766-1837).

The Frobishers were the parents of one son, Rev. James Joseph Frobisher (1805-1843), who was educated at Trinity College, Cambridge. In 1841, at Ringwood, Rev. James married Mary Willis, daughter of George Willis, of Sopley Park, Hampshire. They were the parents of one daughter, Mary Isabella Frobisher (1842-1854), who died at age 12, at Clifton.
