= Patrick Edmonstone Craigie =

General Sir Patrick Edmonstone Craigie KCB
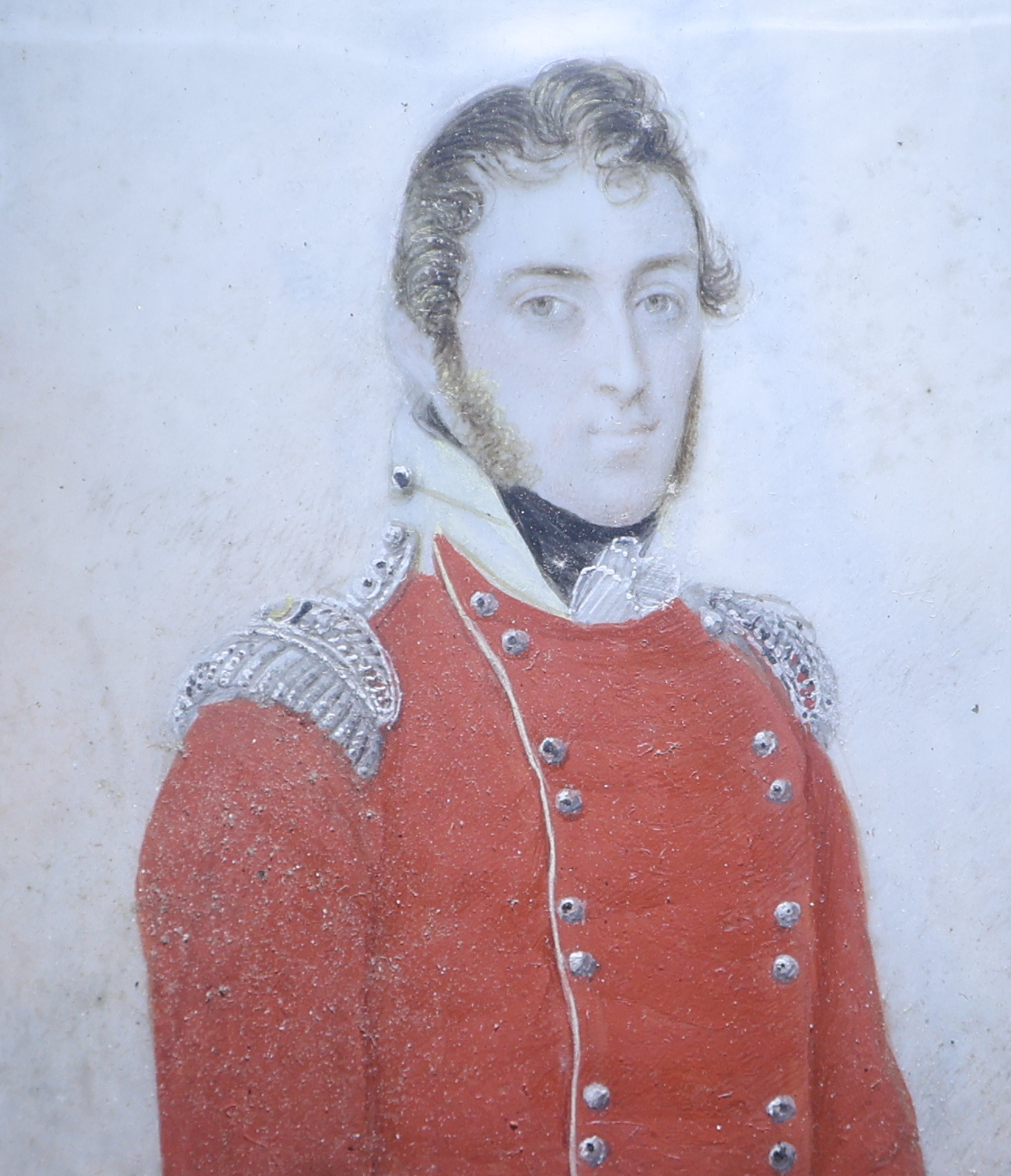
- Miniature of Craigie, 1815
- Born: 3 February 1794; Glasgow
- Died: 13 December 1873 (aged 79); St Leonards-on-Sea, Sussex
- Military career
- Allegiance: United Kingdom
- Branch: Army
- Rank: General
- Conflicts: Napoleonic Wars; First Opium War; Indian Mutiny
- Awards: KCB

General Sir Patrick Edmonstone Craigie, KCB (3 February 1794 – 13 December 1873), also known as Peter Edmonstone Craigie, was a senior officer in the British Army.

== Life ==
Craigie was born the third son of Lawrence Craigie, later twice Lord Provost of Glasgow. He was educated at Glasgow School and College and, in 1813, joined the 52nd (Oxfordshire) Regiment of Foot (Light Infantry) as an ensign.

He served with the 2nd Battalion in Holland during the Napoleonic Wars in the campaign of 1813–14. He took part in the attacks on the fortified village of Merxem on the outskirts of Antwerp, where he led the advance party of Major-General Sir Herbert Taylor's Brigade, and in the bombardment of Antwerp itself. He became Lieutenant by purchase in 1814, Captain by purchase in 1821, and Major by purchase in 1826. In 1834, he transferred as a Lieutenant-Colonel to take command of the 55th Foot.

In 1841, he was posted to China under Lord Gough and commanded the 55th Foot during the First Opium War. There he led a brigade at the capture of Amoy, Chusan and Chinhai. He was subsequently made governor of the Island of Chusan for eight months until the peace treaty had been signed. In reward for his services, he was promoted Colonel in 1842, made Aide-de-Camp to Queen Victoria and a Companion of the Order of the Bath (CB).

From 1855 to 1860, he commanded the Centre Division of the Madras Army and was promoted Major-General in 1854 and Lieutenant-General in 1860. During the Indian Mutiny of 1857, he was in command of the Mysore division at Bangalore until the fall of Delhi.

He was made Colonel of the 31st (Huntingdonshire) Regiment of Foot in 1859, transferring to be Colonel of the 55th Foot from 1862 until his death in 1873. In 1867, he was created KCB and he was promoted to full General on 21 January 1868.

== Death ==
Craigie died at his home in St Leonards-on-Sea, Sussex. He had married twice; firstly Belle, the daughter of Henry Williams and secondly Mary Jane, the daughter of Lt-General Trewman. He had two sons and seven daughters.
