= John Thomas Alston =

John Thomas Alston of Moore Park (1780–1857) was a 19th-century Scottish merchant who served as Lord Provost of Glasgow from 1820 to 1822.

== Life ==
He was born in Glasgow, one of six children of John Alston (1743–1818), a bank cashier with the Thistle Bank, and his wife, Patrick Craigie (sic). The family later lived at 56 Virginia Street. John Thomas moved to separate lodgings at Clyde Street in 1818.

In 1820 he succeeded Henry Monteith as Lord Provost. He then bought Moore Park, a simple Georgian villa by David Hamilton in the Broomloan district of Glasgow. The house was photographed in 1870 by Thomas Annan just prior to its demolition for railway improvements in the city.

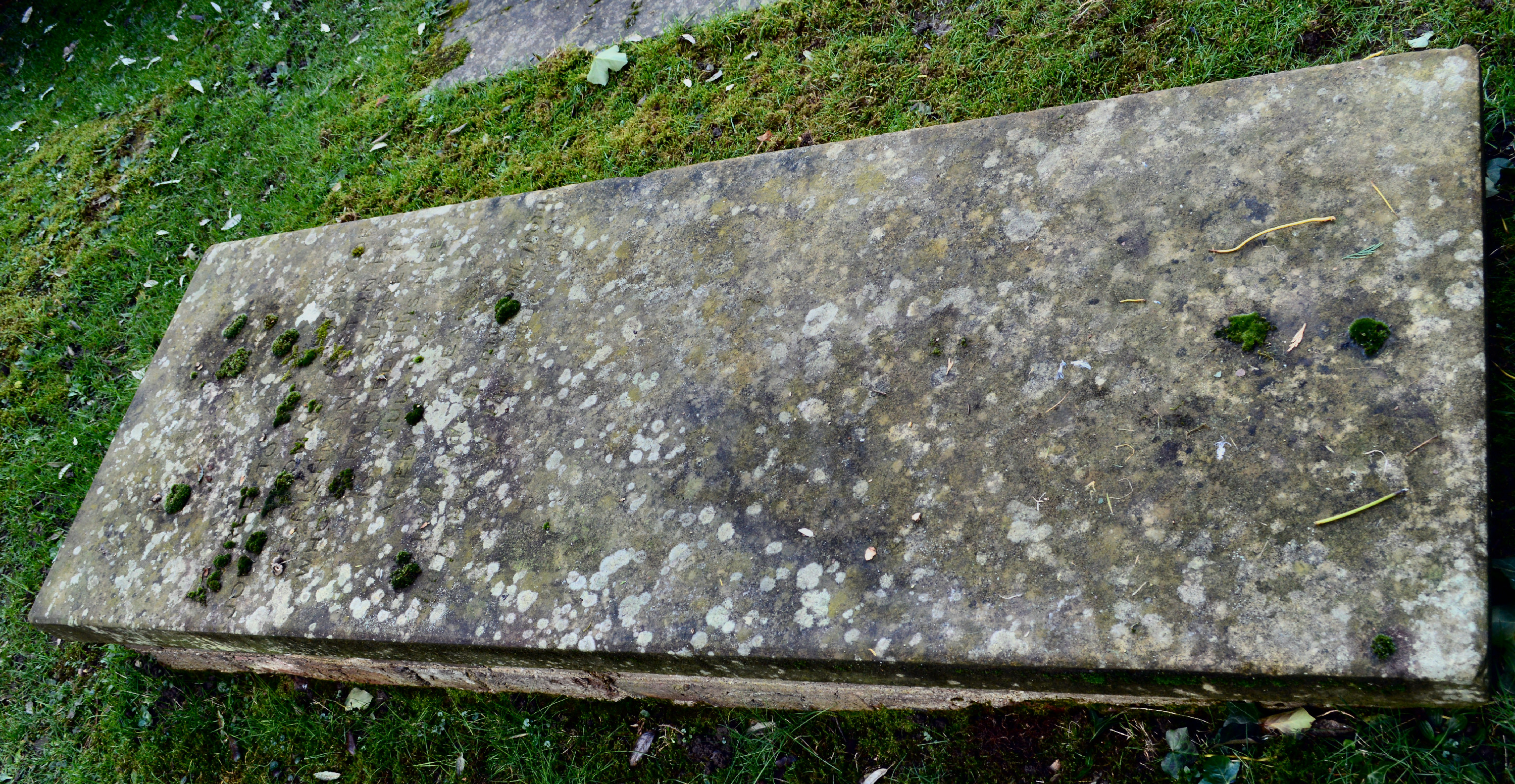
Ledger stone at Petersham

He died on 19 July 1857 in Richmond, Surrey, and is buried at St Peter's Church, Petersham.

== Family ==
In 1810 he was married to Annabella Findlay (1787–1870) daughter of Robert Findlay of Easterhill. Their seven children included Robert Findlay Alston.
