= Gilbert Hamilton of Glenarbuck =

Scottish merchant (1744–1808)

Gilbert Hamilton of Glenarbuck (1744–1808) was an 18th/19th century Scottish merchant who served as Lord Provost of Glasgow 1792 to 1794. His skeletal appearance and dress resulted in his being called a "scarecrow of a provost".

== Life ==
He was born in Glasgow in 1744 the son of Archibald Hamilton.

In 1783 he was joint founder of the Glasgow Chamber of Commerce and served as its first Secretary. The Chamber was set up to protect the interests of the "Virginia Dons" - the tobacco traders who lost many of their assets in America due to the American War of Independence.

Around 1790 he built Glenarbuck House near Bowling, Dunbartonshire.

Around 1795 he was the first President of the Glasgow Humane Society.

Before the Bank of Scotland established its first Glasgow branch, Hamilton acted as Collector for the Glasgow Area.

In 1792 he succeeded James McDowall as Lord Provost of Glasgow. He was succeeded in 1794 by John Dunlop of Rosebank. During his provostship Glasgow banks suffered a major collapse and Hamilton went to London to plead for financial aid and was successful in this task. He also accomplished the rebuilding of the Tron Church and major repairs to Glasgow Cathedral.

He died in Glasgow in 1808.

== Family ==
Not known.

== Artistic recognition ==
He was portrayed in a low-relief cameo by James Tassie.

An oil portrait is held by the Glasgow Chamber of Commerce.
