= Peter Clouston =

Scottish insurance broker and philanthropist (1807–1888)

- Born: 10 August 1807; Greenock, Scotland
- Died: 30 August 1888 (aged 81); Glasgow, Scotland
- Occupations: Insurance broker and philanthropist

Peter Clouston (1807–1888) was a Scottish insurance broker and philanthropist who served as Lord Provost of Glasgow from 1860 to 1863.

== Life ==
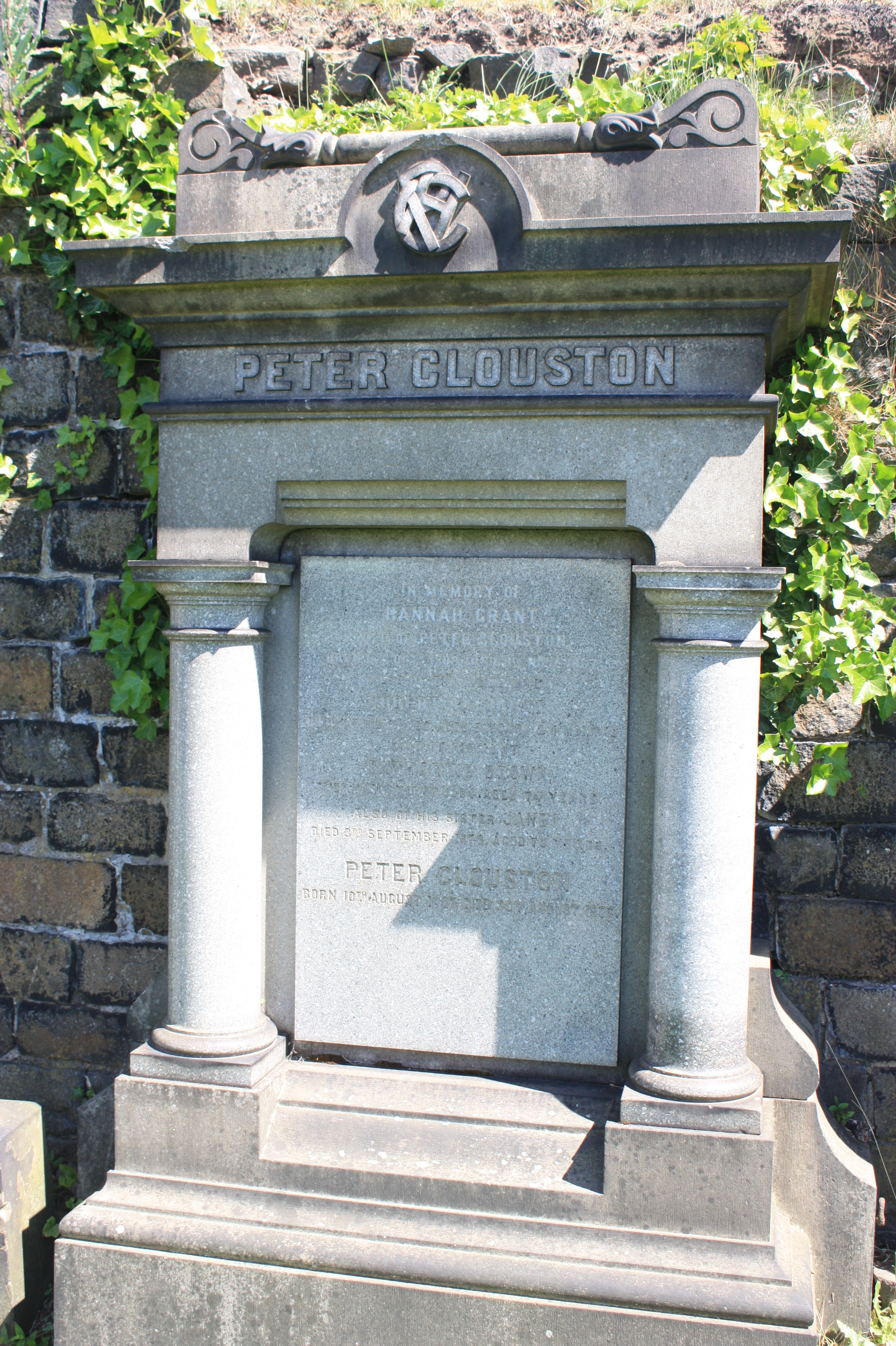
The grave of Peter Clouston, Glasgow Necropolis

He was born in Greenock on 10 August 1807. His father died when he was an infant and his widowed mother moved to Glasgow.

In 1821, at age 14 he was apprenticed to William Bennet & Co, an insurance broker at 185 Exchange in the city centre. The company specialised in marine insurance for Glasgow ships.

Not until around 1840 does he appear as an independent householder, then living at 28 Abbotsford Place in Glasgow and working for Bennet & Browne, an amalgamated firm now operating from 126 Queen Street. William Bennet had died of cholera in 1832 and Clouston and then been made a junior partner with James Browne, but his name never appeared in the company title.

In 1854 he became a town councillor, rising to be Lord Provost in 1860. By this time he was living at 1 Park Terrace, a very attractive five storey Victorian end-terraced house close to Kelvinside Park.

He was later Chairman of the Glasgow and South Western Railway Company

He died in Glasgow on 30 August 1888, aged 81. He is buried in the Glasgow Necropolis. The grave lies on one of the western terraces.

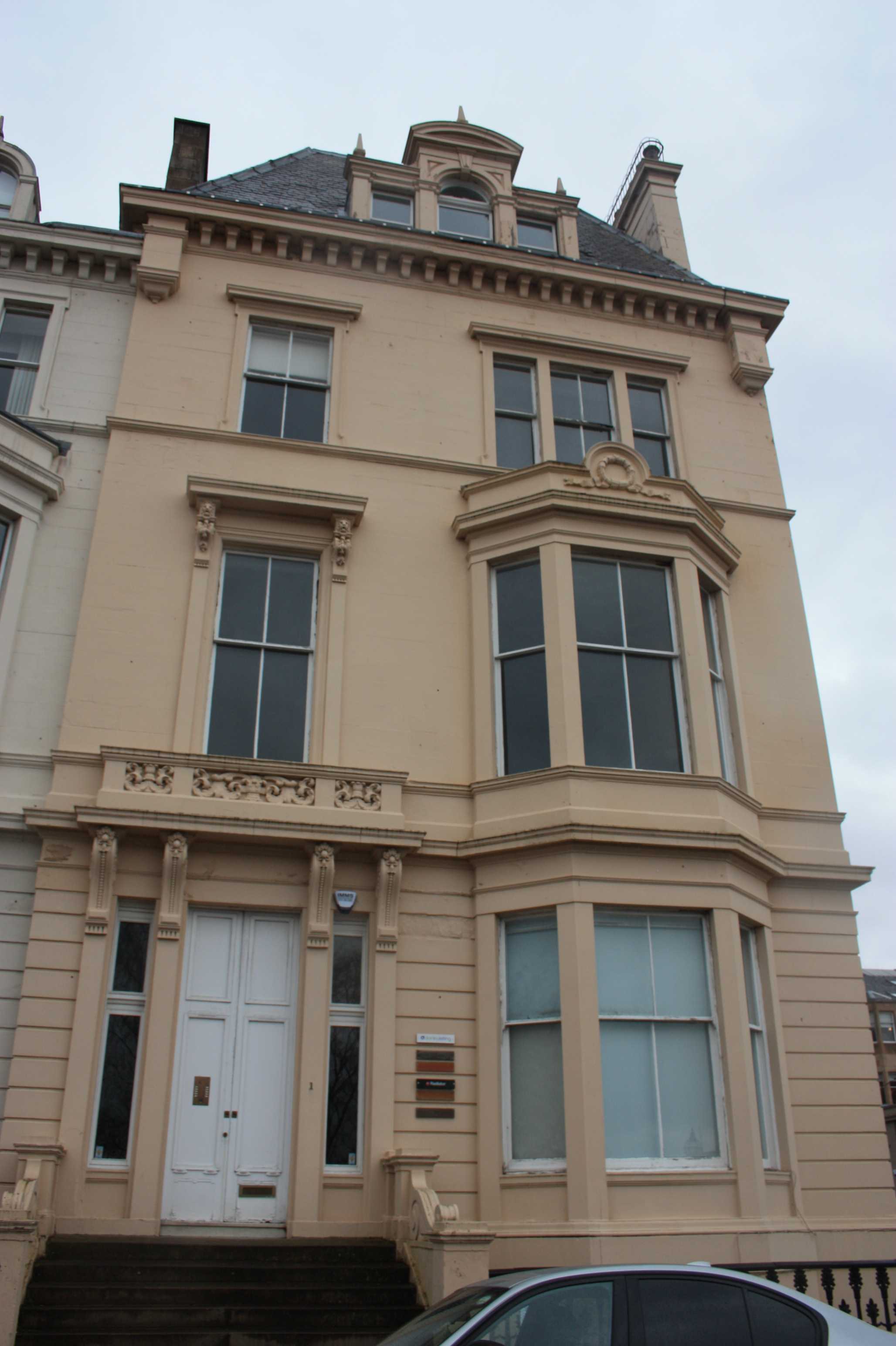
1 Park Terrace, Glasgow

== Artistic recognition ==
Whilst in office he was portrayed by Robert Herdman.

He was also photographed by Camille Silvy.

== Family ==
He was married to Hannah Grant (d.1867).

His daughters married the brothers James and Matthew Bulloch of the "Bay Line" Shipping Company and Bulloch Lade & Co distillers (owners of the Caol Ila distillery) respectively.
