= John Stewart of Minto =

Sir John Stewart of Minto (1525–1583) was a Provost of Glasgow.

He was the son of Robert Stewart of Minto, also a Provost of Glasgow, and Janet Murray. Their ancestral lands were at Minto in the Scottish borders. His uncle John Stewart was Lord Provost 1543/4.

He was Provost of Glasgow from 1565 to 1573.

Stewart was knighted at Holyrood Palace by Mary, Queen of Scots on 8 February 1562 during the festivities at the wedding of the queen's half-brother Lord James Stewart and Agnes Keith.

In 1567 he was one of the senior politicians invited to the coronation of King James VI at Stirling.

In May 1570, he held Glasgow Castle against the forces of the Hamilton family, who were supporters of the queen in exile.

Minto wrote to the lawyer Patrick Vaus of Barnbarroch from the Place of Daildowe (Daldowie) on 21 February 1579 mentioning that he was confined to bed with a sore leg, and had hardly been in the garden for 17 weeks. Their legal business concerned an old loan and reversion of Galloway lands and Agnes Keith, Countess of Moray and her deceased husband and his secretary John Wood.

He died in 1583.

== Marriages and children ==
John Stewart first married Joanna Hepburn. His second wife was Margaret Stewart (1539–1577), daughter of James Stewart of Cardonald and Alice Keith; also sister to James, captain of the guard to the queen of Scotland. Their children included:

- Matthew Stewart of Minto, who married Jonet Stewart. Four times Lord Provost of Glasgow
- Walter Stewart, 1st Lord Blantyre, (d. 1617)
- Marion Stewart, married William Clelland of Clelland
- Janet Stewart (1548–1613), who married Archibald Stewart of Castlemilk
- Agnes Stewart, married John Wallace of Auchans.
