= Glasgow Golf Club =

Golf course and club in Bearsden, Scotland

Coordinates: 55°54′35″N 4°18′5″W

- Interactive map of Glasgow Golf Club

Club information
- Location: Bearsden, East Dunbartonshire (Scotland)
- Established: 1787
- Type: Private
- Owner: Glasgow Golf Club
- Tota holes: 18
- Tournaments: Scottish PGA Championship, Scottish Amateur Championship
- Website: glasgowgolfclub.com

Killermont
- Designed by: Old Tom Morris, James Braid
- Par: 70
- Length: 5,977

Gailes Links
- Designed by: Willie Park Jnr
- Par: 71
- Length: 6,903

Glasgow Golf Club, founded in May 1787, is the ninth oldest golf club in the world. It has changed location several times during its history, but has been based at Killermont in Bearsden since 21 May 1904. The club is unusual in also having a links course, at Gailes, near Irvine, on the Ayrshire coast, some 35 miles away.

== History ==
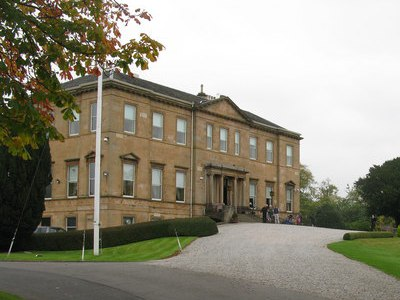
Georgian neoclassical style club house of Glasgow Golf Club, built 1805.

The club was founded in May 1787, the first golf club in the west of Scotland, and now the ninth oldest golf club in the world. Its first Secretary was Lawrence Craigie and it was presided over by Cpt. James Clark.

It was first established at Glasgow Green by 22 men, wealthy merchants and army officers, who would have obtained a permit for the playing of golf in this public space from the town council. The club met here between 1787 and 1794, at which point, active military service in the Napoleonic Wars reduced the number of available players below practical levels. Golf playing recommenced in 1809 and remained at Glasgow Green until 1835 despite some municipal drainage works making the location somewhat unpleasant for leisure activities.

In 1870, the club started to expand, initially at Queen's Park, but moving just four years later to Alexandra Park. There was one further move to Blackhill (in 1895) before the current course at Killermont was secured for private play. It was during this phase of the club's history that the Gailes Links, Irvine, Ayrshire were opened (19 May 1892).

The Killermont course is based in the grounds of the B-listed Georgian neoclassical style Killermont House, built in 1805 by the Campbell-Colquhoun family. It was leased for a 20-year period by Glasgow Golf Club in the autumn of 1903, and a permanent tenancy was agreed in 1922. A similar arrangement with the Colquhoun family is in place with Loch Lomond Golf Club, which has occupied Rossdhu House and the accompanying grounds at Luss since 1993. In 1924 the land on which the Gailes Links course lies was bought from the Duke of Portland.

The Killermont course does not encourage visitors (except for member's guests), but it is possible to play as a visitor on the Gailes course.

== Course details ==
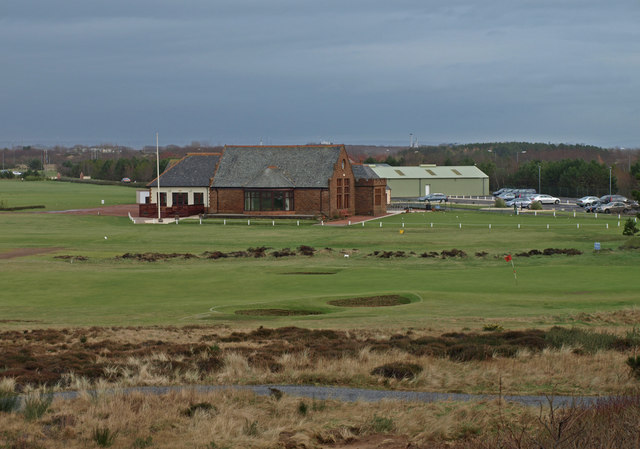
Glasgow Gailes golf course. Showing the original part of the club house.

Killermont is a par-70, parkland course of 5,977 yards (5,465 m), designed in 1904 by Old Tom Morris. The course was altered in 1924 by James Braid, lengthening some of the holes by moving tees further back from the greens and by adding and changing bunkers.

Gailes is a par-71, championship golf links of 6,903 yards (6,312 m) with heather-lined fairways. The current layout was designed by Willie Park Jnr in 1912. It is the only Open Championship Final Qualifying course in Scotland to be selected by The Royal and Ancient Golf Club of St Andrews from 2014 to 2017.

== Arms ==
Coat of arms of Glasgow Golf Club

Escutcheon
Per chevron Azure and Argent in chief a barrulet wavy Argent and in base on a mount in base Vert an oak tree Proper the stem at the base thereof surmounted by a salmon on its back also Proper with a signet ring in its mouth Or on the top of the tree a redbreast and in the sinister fess point an ancient hand bell both also Proper on a chief wavy Argent between two pellets in pale two golf clubs heads upwards in saltire Sable.
Motto
Above the shield is placed a helm suitable to a society (videlicet: a salade Proper lined Gules) with a mantling Azure doubled Argent and in an escrol over the same this motto: SEMPER CUM SUPERBIA.

== See also ==
- Gailes railway station
