= John Dunlop (writer) =

Scottish songwriter

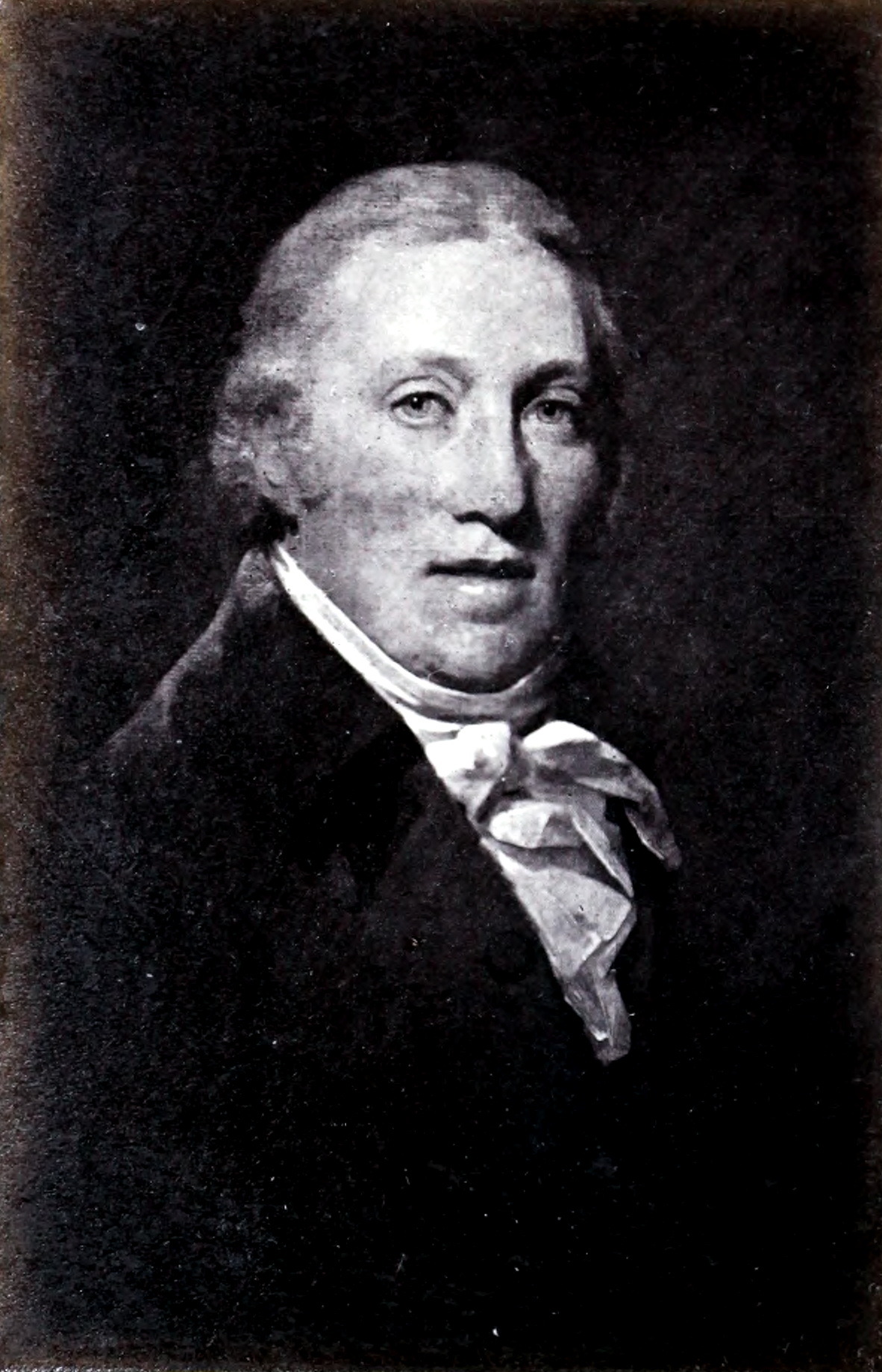
- John Dunlop by Henry Raeburn
- Born: 1755
- Died: 1820 (aged 64–65)

John Dunlop of Rosebank (November 1755 – 4 September 1820) was a Scottish songwriter who served as Lord Provost of Glasgow from 1794 to 1796.

== Life ==
Dunlop was the youngest son of provost Colin Dunlop of Carmyle in the parish of Old Monkland, Lanarkshire.

He began his career as a merchant, and was then collector of customs in Bo'ness and Greenock and was Bailie in Glasgow 1786 to 1788. He lived at Rosebank, near Glasgow, a property which he planted and beautified. Early in the eighteenth century it came into the possession of Provost Murdoch, and through his daughter, Margaret, it fell to her son-in-law, John Dunlop. He was appointed collector of customs at Borrowstounness, whence he was afterwards moved to Port Glasgow. He served as Lord Provost of Glasgow 1794–96.

He was later Collector of Customs at Port Glasgow and died there on 4 September 1820, aged 65.

== Character ==
An active-minded man, he is described as "a merchant, a sportsman, a mayor, a collector, squire, captain and poet, politician and factor". His humour and social qualities made him sought after. He sang well and wrote songs, some of which show a graceful lyrical faculty and are still popular. Oh dinna ask me gin I lo'e ye is perhaps the best known, and with Here's to the year that's awa is often included in collections of Scottish poetry. These and two others by him are in the Modern Scottish Minstrel (1857, v. 77–81) of Dr. C. Rogers. Dunlop was also known as a writer of monumental and other inscriptions. He was a leading member of the convivial Hodge Podge Club in Glasgow, for which some of his verses were composed. In figure he was a "hogshead", but "as jolly a cask as ere loaded the ground". In 1818, he edited for a son of Sir James and Lady Frances Steuart some letters to them from Lady Mary W. Montagu, since reprinted by Lord Wharncliffe. He printed for private circulation a couple of volumes of his occasional pieces, and his son, John Colin Dunlop, the author of the History of Fiction, edited a volume of his poems in 1836. According to the statement of the Rev. Charles Rogers, four volumes of poetry in manuscript are in existence.

== Family ==
He married Jessy Miller of Glenlee, daughter of Thomas Miller, Lord Glenlee and granddaughter of John Murdoch of Rosebank.

== Publications ==
His works are:

1. "Poems on several Occasions", Greenock, 1817–19, 2 vols. octavo (only ten copies, privately printed; one is in the Abbotsford Library).
2. Original Letters from the Right Hon. Lady Mary W. Montagu to Sir James and Lady Frances Steuart, and Memoirs and Anecdotes of those distinguished Persons, duodecimo, Greenock, 1818 (privately printed).
3. "Poems on several Occasions from 1793 to 1816", octavo, Edinburgh, 1836 (only fifty copies privately printed by J. Colin Dunlop).

Not one of these three works is in the British Museum.
