= George Murdoch (Lord Provost) =

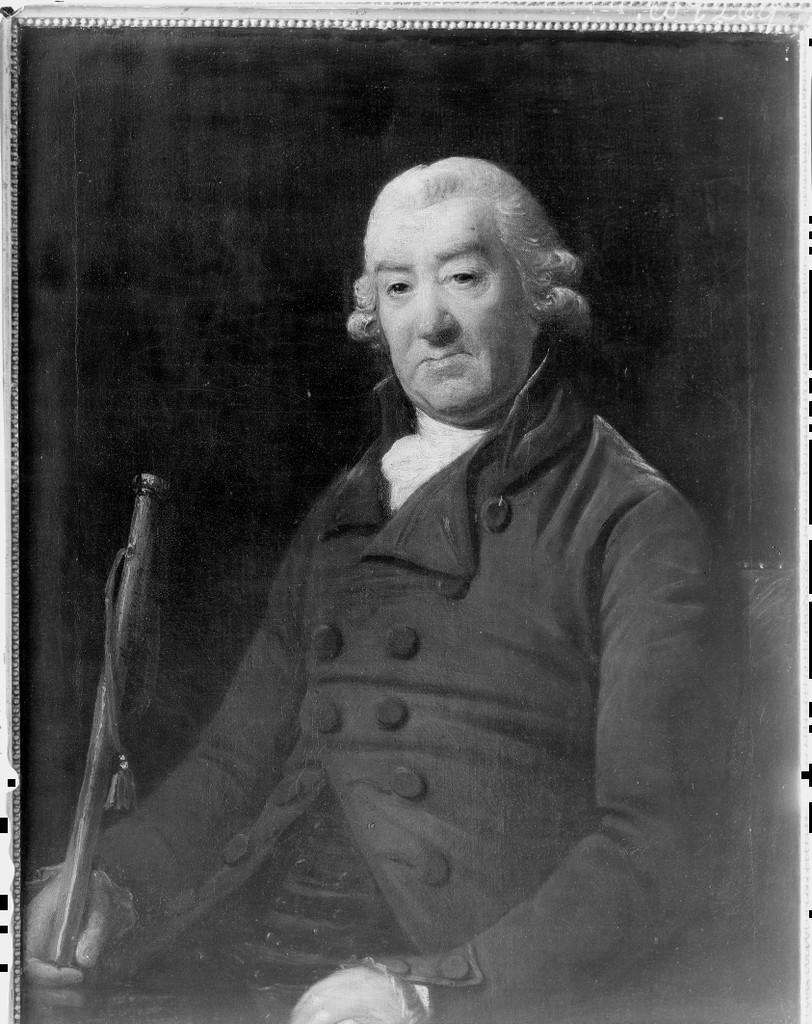
- portrait by David Martin
- Born: January 1715; Glasgow
- Died: 19 September 1795 (aged 79–80)
- Occupation: Merchant

George Murdoch (1715–1795) was an 18th-century Scottish merchant who twice served as Lord Provost of Glasgow: 1754–1756 and 1766–1768.

== Life ==
He was born in Glasgow on 23 January 1715 the son of James Murdoch and his wife Elizabeth Wingate. As a merchant he was primarily involved in the importation of Madeira wine and in connection to this was joint founder of the Glasgow Bottle Works in 1742. He also was partner in the Murdoch & Warroch company who built and operated the Anderston Brewery from around 1762.

An active freemason Murdoch was Master of Lodge Glasgow Kilwinning no.4 and rose to be regional Grand Master.

In 1754 he succeeded John Brown as Lord Provost of Glasgow being succeeded in 1756 by Robert Christie. He served a second time, in 1766 he succeeding John Bowman as Lord Provost of Glasgow. After this second term he was succeeded in 1768 by James Buchanan of Drumpellier. In his role as Lord Provost he laid the foundation stone of Jamaica Bridge in September 1768 (the second bridge over the River Clyde in the city). He was chastised for not informing his fellow masons in advance of this action.

In 1775, during his control of Anderston Brewery, they began brewing Glasgow porter which became a national success.

He died at Frisky Hall on the banks of the Firth of Clyde, at Bowling Dunbartonshire on 19 September 1795.

== Family ==
He married three times: Amelia Campbell, Janet Bogle and Margaret Leitch. He had at least eleven children.

== Artistic recognition ==
He was portrayed by both Sir Henry Raeburn and David Martin.
