= List of provosts of Glasgow =

Ceremonial officer in Glasgow, Scotland

The Right Honourable Lord Provost of Glasgow is the convener of the Glasgow City Council. The Lord Provost serves as the chair of the city council and is elected by the city councillors from among its members at the council's first meeting.

The Lord Provost of the City of Glasgow, by virtue of office, is also:

- Lord-Lieutenant of the County of the City of Glasgow
- a Commissioner of Northern Lighthouses.

Each of the 32 Scottish local authorities elects a provost, but it is only the four biggest cities, Glasgow, Edinburgh, Aberdeen and Dundee that have a Lord Provost, who also serves as the lord-lieutenant for the city. This is codified in the Local Government etc. (Scotland) Act 1994. As of 2017, the role attracts a salary of £41,546, plus an annual expenses budget of £5000.

The Lord Provost of Glasgow elected in May 2022 was Dr Jacqueline McLaren.

The Lord Provost of Glasgow has the use of an official limousine which is always black and always carries the registration plate "G0". Past limousines are on display at the city's Transport Museum. The current limousine is a Rolls-Royce Ghost, donated by Boyd Tunnock in 2018. It was sold in 2022 for approximately £105,000, to go to the Duke of Edinburgh scheme.

== List of provosts and lord provosts ==
The Medieval burgh of Glasgow was administered on behalf of the Bishops of Glasgow by officials known as Bailies or Provosts. The office of Provost as a single chief magistrate was not created until the early 1450s.

=== 15th century ===
- (1450x1453–1479) John Stewart
- (1480) Sir Thomas Stewart of Minto
- (1485–1489) Robert Stewart
- (1491) Andrew Otterburn
- (1497) Matthew Stewart, 2nd Earl of Lennox
- (1498) Sir Patrick Blacader of Tulliallan
- (1498–1499) John Stewart

=== 16th century ===
- (1502–1505) Allan Stewart of Cardonald
- (1505–1507) Patrick Colquhoun of Glen
- (1507–1509) Sir John Stewart of Minto
- (1509–1513) Matthew Stewart, 2nd Earl of Lennox
- (1513–1514) John Shaw
- (1514–1516) George Colquhoun of Glen
- (1526–1536) Sir Robert Stewart of Minto
- (1537–1539) Archibald Dunbar of Baldoon
- (1543–1544) Sir John Stewart of Minto
- (1544–1549) Archibald Hamilton of Medop
- (1549–1550) James Hamilton of Torrance
- (1550–1559) Andrew Hamilton of Cochno
- (1559–1562) Robert Lindsay of Dunrod
- (1565–1573) Sir John Stewart of Minto
- (1573–1576) Robert Boyd, 5th Lord Boyd
- (1577) Thomas Crawford of Jordanhill
- (1578–1579) Robert Stewart, 7th Earl of Lennox
- (1580) Esmé Stewart, 8th Earl of Lennox
- (1581–1582) Sir Matthew Stewart of Minto
- (1583) John Graham, 3rd Earl of Montrose
- (1584–1585) Sir William Livingstone of Kilsyth
- (1588–1589) Sir Matthew Stewart of Minto
- (1594–1597) Sir Matthew Stewart of Minto
- (1599) Sir Matthew Stewart of Minto

=== 17th century ===
- (1600–1601) Sir George Elphinstone of Blythswood
- (1604–1605) Sir George Elphinstone of Blythswood
- (1607–1608) John Houston of Houston
- (1609–1612) James Inglis
- (1613) James Stewart I
- (1614–1616) James Hamilton
- (1617–1618) James Stewart I
- (1619–1620) James Inglis
- (1621–1622) James Hamilton
- (1623–1624) Gabriel Cunningham
- (1625–1626) James Inglis
- (1627–1628) James Hamilton
- (1629–1632) Gabriel Cunningham
- (1633) William Stewart
- (1634–1635) Patrick Bell
- (1636) Colin Campbell I
- (1637) James Stewart II
- (1638) Patrick Bell
- (1639) Gabriel Cunningham
- (1640) James Stewart II
- (1641–1642) William Stewart
- (1643–1644) James Bell
- (1645–1646) George Porterfield
- (1647) James Stewart
- (1648) Colin Campbell II
- (1648–1649) George Porterfield
- (1650) John Graham
- (1651) George Porterfield
- (1652) Daniel Wallace
- (1655–1656) John Anderson I
- (1658) John Anderson II
- (1658–1659) Sir John Bell
- (1660–1661) Colin Campbell II
- (1662–1663) Sir John Bell
- (1664–1666) William Anderson
- (1667) John Anderson II
- (1668) William Anderson
- (1669) James Campbell
- (1670–1673) William Anderson
- (1674–1675) Sir John Bell
- (1676–1677) James Campbell
- (1678–1681) Sir John Bell
- (1682–1683) John Barns
- (1684–1685) John Johnston
- (1686–1687) John Barns
- (1688-1689) Walter Gibson
- (1689–1690) John Anderson III
- (1691–1692) James Peadie of Ruchill
- (1693–1694) William Napier
- (1695–1696) John Anderson III
- (1697–1698) James Peadie of Ruchill
- (1699–1700) John Anderson III

=== 18th century ===
- (1701–1703) Sir Hugh Montgomery
- (1703–1705) John Anderson III
- (1705–1707) John Aird
- (1707–1709) Robert Rodger (Whig)
- (1709–1711) John Aird
- (1711–1713) Robert Rodger (Whig)
- (1713–1715) John Aird
- (1715–1717) John Bowman I
- (1717–1719) John Aird
- (1719–1721) John Bowman I
- (1721–1723) John Aird
- (1723–1725) Charles Miller
- (1725–1727) John Stark
- (1727–1728) James Peadie II
- (1728–1730) John Stirling
- (1730–1732) Peter Murdoch of Rosehill
- (1732–1734) Hugh Rodger
- (1734–1736) Andrew Ramsay
- (1736–1738) John Coulter
- (1738–1740) Andrew Alton
- (1740–1742) Andrew Buchanan of Drumpellier
- (1742–1744) Lawrence Dinwiddie
- (1744–1746) Andrew Cochrane
- (1746–1748) John Murdoch of Rosebank
- (1748–1750) Andrew Cochrane
- (1750–1752) John Murdoch of Rosebank
- (1752–1754) John Brown
- (1754–1756) George Murdoch
- (1756–1758) Robert Christie
- (1758–1760) John Murdoch of Rosebank
- (1760–1762) Andrew Cochrane
- (1762–1764) Archibald Ingram
- (1764–1766) John Bowman II
- (1766–1768) George Murdoch
- (1768–1770) James Buchanan of Drumpellier
- (1770–1772) Colin Dunlop of Carmyle
- (1772–1774) Arthur Connell
- (1774–1776) James Buchanan of Drumpellier
- (1776–1778) Robert Donald
- (1778–1780) William French
- (1780) James Coats Campbell
- (1780–1782) Hugh Wyllie
- (1782–1784) Patrick Colquhoun
- (1784–1786) James Coats Campbell
- (1786–1788) John Riddell
- (1788–1790) John Campbell of Clathick
- (1790–1792) James McDowall
- (1792–1794) Gilbert Hamilton of Glenarbuck
- (1794–1796) John Dunlop of Rosebank
- (1796–1798) James McDowall
- (1798–1800) Lawrence Craigie

=== 19th century ===
- (1800–1802) John Hamilton
- (1802–1804) Lawrence Craigie
- (1804–1806) John Hamilton
- (1806–1808) James MacKenzie of Craigpark
- (1808–1810) James Black
- (1810–1812) John Hamilton
- (1812–1814) Kirkman Finlay (Tory)
- (1814–1816) Henry Monteith
- (1816–1818) James Black
- (1818) Kirkman Finlay (Tory)
- (1818–1820) Henry Monteith
- (1820–1822) John Thomas Alston
- (1822–1824) William Smith of Carbeth Guthrie
- (1824–1826) Mungo Nutter Campbell
- (1826–1828) William Hamilton son of John Hamilton
- (1828–1830) Alexander Garden
- (1830–1832) Robert Dalglish
- (1832–1833) James Ewing
- (1833–1834) Robert Grahame of Whitehill (Whig)
- (1834–1837) William Mills (Whig)
- (1837–1840) Henry Dunlop of Craigton FRSE (Whig)
- (1840–1843) Sir James Campbell (Conservative)
- (1843–1846) James Lumsden (Whig)
- (1846–1848) Alexander Hastie (Whig)
- (1848–1851) Sir James Anderson
- (1851–1854) Robert Stewart
- (1854–1857) Sir Andrew Orr (Liberal)
- (1857–1860) Andrew Galbraith
- (1860–1863) Peter Clouston
- (1863–1866) John Blackie (Liberal)
- (1866–1869) Sir James Lumsden (Liberal)
- (1869–1871) William Rae Arthur
- (1871–1874) Sir James Watson
- (1874–1877) Sir James Bain
- (1877–1880) Sir William Collins (Liberal)
- (1880–1883) John Ure
- (1883–1886) Sir William McOnie
- (1886–1889) Sir James King
- (1889–1892) Sir John Muir
- (1892–1896) Sir James Bell
- (1896–1899) Sir David Richmond

=== 20th century ===
- 1899–1902 – Sir Samuel Chisholm (Liberal)
- 1902–1905 – Sir John Ure Primrose (Conservative)
- 1905–1908 – Sir William Bilsland
- 1908–1911 – Sir Archibald McInnes Shaw (Conservative)
- 1911–1914 – Sir Daniel Macaulay Stevenson (Liberal)
- 1914–1917 – Sir Thomas Dunlop (Unionist)
- 1917–1920 – Sir James Stewart
- 1920–1923 – Sir Thomas Paxton (Unionist)
- 1923–1926 – Sir Matthew Walker Montgomery (Unionist)
- 1926–1929 – Sir David Mason (Moderates)
- 1929–1932 – Sir Thomas Kelly (Moderates)
- 1932–1935 – Sir Alexander B Swan (Moderates)
- 1935–1938 – Sir John Stewart (Labour)
- 1938–1941 – Sir Patrick Dollan (Labour)
- 1941–1943 – John McLaren Biggar (Labour)
- 1943–1945 – James Welsh (Labour)
- 1945–1949 – Sir Hector McNeill (Labour)
- 1949–1952 – Sir Victor Warren (Progressive)
- 1952–1955 – Thomas Kerr (Labour)
- 1955–1958 – Andrew Hood (Labour)
- 1958–1960 – Sir Myer Galpern (Labour)
- 1960–1963 – Dame Jean Roberts (Labour)
- 1963–1965 – Sir Peter Meldrum (Labour)
- 1965–1969 – John Johnston (Labour)
- 1969–1972 – Sir Donald Liddle (Progressive)
- May–July 1972 – John Mains (Labour)
- 1972–1975 – Sir William Gray (Labour)
- 1975–1977 – Peter McCann (Labour)
- 1977–1980 – David Hodge (Labour)
- 1980–1984 – Michael Kelly (Labour)
- 1984–1988 – Robert Gray (Labour)
- 1988–1992 – Susan Baird (Labour)
- 1992–1994 – Robert Innes (Labour)
- 1994–1995 – James Shields (Labour)
- 1995–1996 – Tommy Dingwall (Labour)
- 1996–1999 – Pat Lally (Labour)
- 1999–2003 – Alex Mosson (Labour)

=== 21st century ===
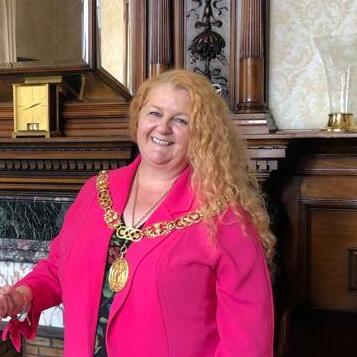
Dr Jacqueline McLaren, Lord Provost of Glasgow in 2022

- 2003–2007 – Liz Cameron (Labour)
- 2007–2012 – Bob Winter (Labour)
- 2012–2017 – Sadie Docherty (Labour)
- 2017–2019 – Eva Bolander (Scottish National Party)
- 2019–2022 - Philip Braat (Labour)
- 2022– Jacqueline McLaren (Scottish National Party)

== Deputy lieutenants ==
A deputy lieutenant of Glasgow is commissioned by the Lord Lieutenant of Glasgow. Deputy lieutenants support the work of the lord-lieutenant. There can be several deputy lieutenants at any time, depending on the population of the county. Their appointment does not terminate with the changing of the lord-lieutenant, but they usually retire at age 75.

=== 19th Century ===
- 6 February 1894: Charles Douglas-Home, 12th Earl of Home
- 6 February 1894: Lieutenant Colonel Archibald Campbell, 1st Baron Blythswood
- 6 February 1894: William Thomson, 1st Baron Kelvin
- 6 February 1894: John White, 1st Baron Overtoun
- 6 February 1894: Sir John Stirling-Maxwell
- 6 February 1894: Sir Charles Tennant
- 6 February 1894: Sir James King
- 6 February 1894: Sir John Burns
- 6 February 1894: Sir William Wallace Hozier
- 6 February 1894: Sir John Muir
- 6 February 1894: Sir Charles Cameron
- 6 February 1894: Brigadier General Sir Donald Matheson}
- 6 February 1894: Sir William Collins
- 6 February 1894: Sir James Bain
- 6 February 1894: Sir John Neilson Cuthbertson
- 6 February 1894: Sir William McOnie}
- 6 February 1894: Sir William Kenny Watson
- 6 February 1894: John Anderson
- 6 February 1894: William Rae Arthur
- 6 February 1894: James G. A. Baird
- 6 February 1894: J. C. Bolton
- 6 February 1894: Hugh Brown
- 6 February 1894: James Alexander Campbell
- 6 February 1894: Charles Gairdner
- 6 February 1894: Donald Graham
- 6 February 1894: Sir Thomas Mason
- 6 February 1894: Alexander Osborne
- 6 February 1894: John Guthrie Smith
- 6 February 1894: James Reid Stewart
- 6 February 1894: John Ure
- 16 December 1902: Sir Samuel Chisholm

=== 21st Century ===
- 9 July 2004: Christine Devine
- 9 July 2004: Alex Mosson
- 9 July 2004: Mary Paris
- 9 July 2004: Robert Winter
