= Dean of Guild =

A Dean of Guild, under Scots law, was one of a group of burgh magistrates who, in later years, had the care of buildings. The leader of the group was known as Lord Dean of Guild.

Originally, the post was held by the head of the Guild brethren of Scottish towns, and dates back to the 12th century. Later, the phrase Dean of Guild also described the courts set up in the 14th century to settle trade disputes. In the 19th century they became responsible for enforcing the burgh's building regulations, a role that was replaced in the mid 20th century by statutory legislation.

This should not be confused with the Dean of a guild, the head of such association.

A more recently formed body - The Court of Deans of Guild of Scotland - exists to incorporate the Guildry organisations of Aberdeen, Arbroath, Ayr, Berwick-upon-Tweed, Brechin, Dundee, Edinburgh, Glasgow, Lanark, Perth and Stirling, and represent them as an umbrella organisation.

== Lord Dean of Guild ==
In several Scottish burghs the dean of guild was accorded the honorific style Lord Dean of Guild. The Scottish National Dictionary records the form as characteristic of Edinburgh and Dundee usage, and notes that after the Burgh Reform Act of 1833 the dean sat as a constituent member of the town council. By the mid-twentieth century the dean was chosen by the councillors from among their own number in most burghs, the exceptions being Aberdeen, Dundee, Edinburgh, Glasgow and Perth, where the guildry itself continued to elect him. The style attached to the office rather than to the holder, was held only for the duration of the term, and conferred no peerage or other rank outside the burgh. Section 360 of the Local Government (Scotland) Act 1947 expressly preserved the right of any guildry, merchants house or trades house to elect its own dean of guild free of control by the town council.

=== The office in Edinburgh ===
The Lord Dean of Guild of Edinburgh presided over the Dean of Guild Court of the burgh, whose records run from 1529 to 1975. The court was initially concerned with the common welfare of the city, the private rights and duties of burgesses and the conduct of trade, and its remit later broadened to take in disputes between neighbours, weights and measures and public nuisances. The dean of guild had been given statutory recognition as one of the ordinary magistrates of a royal burgh in 1469, and the Edinburgh court in particular heard offences against "nychtburheid", or neighbourliness. A new constitution laid down by the town council in 1584 was ratified by Parliament in 1593, and an act of the same year confirmed the dean's jurisdiction over disputes between merchants and between merchants and mariners. Writing in 1890, Bell's Dictionary of the Law of Scotland described the Edinburgh court as consisting of the dean of guild, the old dean of guild, and a council of merchants and tradesmen chosen annually.

The court's geographical jurisdiction covered the Old Royalty of the city, Leith, the Canongate, the West Port, Potterrow, the Pleasance and later the Extended Royalty of the New Town; Leith was detached in 1842 and had its own court until Edinburgh regained jurisdiction in 1920. Following serious fires, council acts of 1674 and 1698 gave the court responsibility for building regulation and for ruinous buildings, and by the middle of the seventeenth century it had begun to require the submission of plans before building. Its older functions were progressively stripped away: admiralty cases passed to a separate court under Charles II, weights and measures were removed by the introduction of imperial standard measures in 1824, and the exclusive trading rights of burgesses were abolished in 1846. The Edinburgh Municipal and Police Amendment Act 1891 made the court's permission necessary before erecting or altering a building, and from 1964 it enforced the building standards introduced under the Building (Scotland) Act 1959. The Dean of Guild Court of Edinburgh was abolished on 16 May 1975 under the Local Government (Scotland) Act 1973, its remaining functions passing to the building control department of the district council.

=== Precedence and modern use ===
The Lord Dean of Guild ranked as the second citizen of Edinburgh, after the Lord Provost. Burgess tickets, which historically had to be held by anyone wishing to earn a living in the city, were signed in the presence of the Lord Dean of Guild.

When the burgess system lapsed at the local government reorganisation of 1973, the Company of Merchants of the City of Edinburgh took the office to itself. The style is now conferred on the Old Master, the immediately preceding holder of the Company's mastership, who signs the certificates of new members admitted to the guildry alongside the Master, and who sits on the joint committee formed with the Incorporated Trades to consider nominations for burgess-ship, an arrangement agreed with the City of Edinburgh Council in 2007.

=== Other burghs ===
The style survives elsewhere in Scotland. In Glasgow the Lord Dean of Guild heads the Merchants House and is described by the city council, together with the Deacon Convener of the Trades House, as the second and third citizens of the city after the Lord Provost. The Lord Dean of Guild of Dundee presides over the Guildry Incorporation of Dundee, and the Aberdeen Burgesses of Guild record that the style was bestowed on them by the Lord Lyon King of Arms in February 2015. Holders of the office represent their guildries on the Court of Deans of Guild of Scotland, established in 1989, whose chair is styled Lord President.

== See also ==
- Convention of Royal Burghs
