= Lord provost =

Head political office of major Scottish cities

A lord provost (Scottish Gaelic: Àrd-Phrobhaist) is the convenor of the local authority, the civic head and the lord-lieutenant of one of the principal cities of Scotland. The office is similar to that of a lord mayor. Only the cities of Aberdeen, Dundee, Edinburgh, Stirling and Glasgow have a lord provost; other Scottish local authorities have provosts or convenors, which are similar offices to that of a mayor (as a presiding officer of the local council, not as a chief executive of a local authority). Perth (as a city) previously termed its civil leader a "lord provost", but from the Second World War onwards has preferred the simple term Provost of Perth.

A lord provost has a higher status than a lord mayor in other parts of the United Kingdom. They are ex officio the lord-lieutenant for that city, in accordance with section 1 of the Lieutenancies Act 1997, which allows the city council to choose its own representative for the monarch.

The lord provosts of Edinburgh and Glasgow enjoy the style of "The Right Honourable" before their office, but not their names.

Permission to use the title is granted to a city by the monarch, under the royal prerogative, acting on the advice of government ministers.

== See also ==
- Provost (civil)
- List of provosts of Aberdeen
- List of provosts of Dundee
- List of provosts of Edinburgh
- List of provosts of Glasgow
- Lord mayor
