= Dundee Futsal Club =

- Full name: Dundee Futsal Club
- Founded: 2013
- Ground: Dundee International Sports Centre, Dundee
- League: Scottish Futsal Super League
- Website: http://www.dundeefutsalclub.co.uk/
Home colours

Dundee Futsal Club is a Scottish futsal club based in the city of Dundee, who compete in the Scottish Futsal League. The club made history by becoming the first ever SFA Quality Marked Futsal Club in 2014.

== History ==
Dundee Futsal Club was founded in 2013. The club made history by becoming the first ever SFA Quality Marked futsal club in January 2014 and became Scottish Futsal League Two Champions in May 2014 in the club's first ever season playing futsal.

== Colours and badge ==
Dundee Futsal Club's colours are Blue and White

== Scottish Futsal Super League ==
Dundee Futsal Club played their Scottish Futsal League matches at Bells Sports Centre, Perth, ending the season as League Two Champions 2013/14. In season 2014/15, the club moved to the newly created Dundee Regional League under the Scottish Futsal League.

2014/15 saw the Club finish 3rd in the league and were runners Up in the East Region Cup.

2015/16 saw the Club finish 2nd place and make the last 16 of the newly formatted Scottish Futsal Cup.

Dundee achieved their highest ever finish in the Super League finishing second behind reigning champions, PYF Saltires.

== Scottish Futsal Cup ==
Dundee Futsal Club made it to the finals of the Scottish Futsal Cup in their debut season, finishing in third place. The Scottish Futsal Cup returned in 2015-16 with a new format in which the club made it to the last 16 of the competition.

In the 2023 season, Dundee Futsal Club reached the final of the Scottish Cup. However, they were defeated by Aberdeen Futsal Academy.

== First Team Squad 2016/2017 ==
Note: Flags indicate national team as defined under FIFA eligibility rules; some limited exceptions apply. Players may hold more than one non-FIFA nationality.

No.	Pos.	Nation	Player
2	MF	(Portugal) POR	Joel Rocha
3	MF	(Scotland) SCO	Sam Pirrie
4	MF	(Scotland) SCO	Ross McGregor
5	MF	(Scotland) SCO	Andrew Santos
6	MF	(Scotland) SCO	Sean Mohan

No.	Pos.	Nation	Player
8	MF	(Scotland) SCO	Matthew Morgan
14	MF	(Germany) GER	Christian Beckers
13	GK	(Scotland) SCO	Sean Moran
12	GK	(Poland) POL	Marek Ciepacz

Note: Flags indicate national team as defined under FIFA eligibility rules; some limited exceptions apply. Players may hold more than one non-FIFA nationality.

No.	Pos.	Nation	Player

== Honours ==
=== Leagues ===
- Scottish Futsal League Dundee
  - Winners (1) 2016–17
- SFA East Region Summer League
  - Winners (B Team) 2016
- Scottish Futsal League Dundee
  - Runners Up (1) 2015–16
- Scottish Futsal League Two
  - Winners (1) 2013–14

=== Cups ===
- East Region Futsal Cup
  - Runners Up 2014–15
- Scottish Futsal Cup
  - 3rd Place 2013–14

=== Awards ===
- SFLDundee Fair Play Award
  - Winner 2015–16
