= Glasgow Necropolis =

Victorian cemetery in Glasgow, Scotland

Coordinates: 55.86217°N 4.23340°W

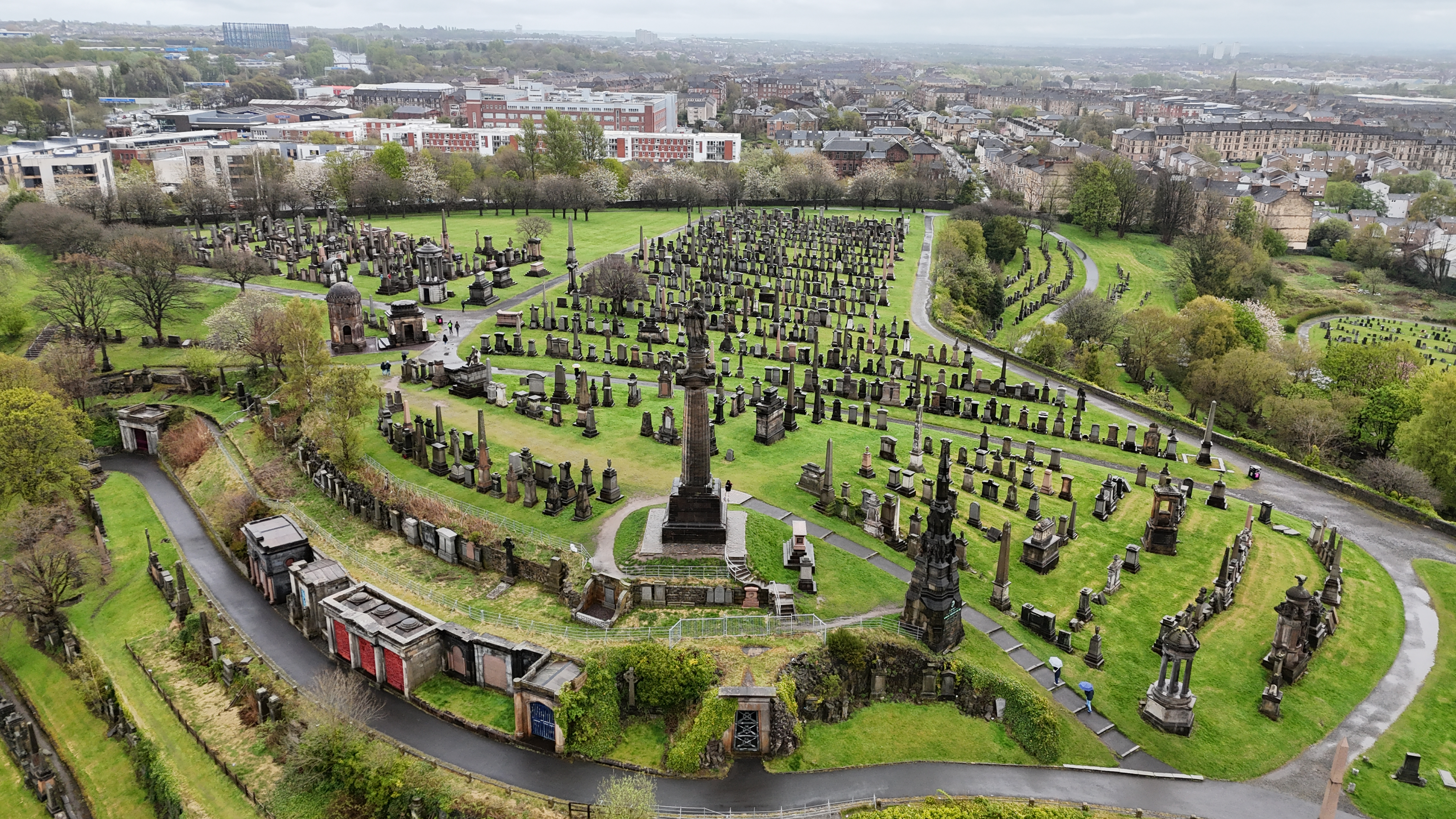
- Aerial view of Glasgow Necropolis
- Interactive map of Glasgow Necropolis

Details
- Established: 1832; 194 years ago
- Location: Glasgow
- Country: Scotland
- Type: Public
- Size: 37 acres (15 ha)
- No. of interments: 50,000
- Website: http://www.glasgownecropolis.org
- The Political Graveyard

Inventory of Gardens and Designed Landscapes in Scotland
- Official name: The Necropolis
- Designated: 1 July 1987
- Reference no.: GDL00366

The Glasgow Necropolis is a Victorian garden cemetery in Glasgow, Scotland. It is on a low but very prominent hill to the east of Glasgow Cathedral (St Mungo's Cathedral) in an area bordered by the Townhead and Dennistoun districts to the north east of the modern city centre. Fifty thousand individuals have been buried here. Typical for the period, only a small percentage are named on monuments and not every grave has a stone. Approximately 3,500 monuments exist here.

== Background ==
Following the creation of Père Lachaise Cemetery in Paris, a wave of pressure began for cemeteries in Britain. This required a change in the law to allow burial for profit. Previously, the parish church held responsibility for burying the dead but there was a growing need for an alternative. Glasgow was one of the first to join this campaign, having a growing population, with fewer and fewer attending church. Led by Lord Provost James Ewing of Strathleven, the planning of the cemetery was started by the Merchants' House of Glasgow in 1831, in anticipation of a change in the law. The Cemeteries Act was passed in 1832 and Glasgow Necropolis officially opened in April 1833. Just before this, in September 1832, a Jewish burial ground had been established in the north-west section of the land. This small area was declared "full" in 1851.

== History ==
Monument to John Knox at the summit of Fir Park (on the right) in 1831, with Glasgow Cathedral on the left. The Bridge of Sighs is not yet built

Gate to the Bridge of Sighs

Pre-dating the cemetery, the statue of John Knox standing on a column at the top of the hill in Fir Park, as the area was called at the time, dates from 1825.

The first burials were in 1832 in the extreme north-west on the lowest ground and were exclusively for Jewish burials (see section below).

Alexander Thomson designed a number of its tombs, and John Bryce and David Hamilton designed other architecture for the grounds.

The main entrance is approached by a bridge over what was then the Molendinar Burn. The bridge, which was designed by David Hamilton was completed in 1836. It became known as the "Bridge of Sighs" because it was part of the route of funeral processions (the name is an allusion to the Bridge of Sighs in Venice). The ornate gates (by both David and James Hamilton) were erected in 1838, restricting access onto the bridge.

Three recent memorials lie between the gates and the actual bridge: a memorial for stillborn children and neonatal deaths; a memorial to the Korean War; and a memorial to Glaswegian recipients of the Victoria Cross.

At the necropolis end of the Bridge of Sighs stands a facade, which was originally meant as the entrance to a catacomb, where bodies could be stored. However, this setup proved to be unviable. The 1836 facade itself remains.

The cemetery, as most early Victorian cemeteries, is laid out as an informal park, lacking the formal grid layouts of later cemeteries. This layout is further enhanced by the complex topography. The cemetery's paths meander uphill towards the summit, where many of the larger monuments stand, clustered around the John Knox Monument.

The Glasgow Necropolis was described by James Stevens Curl as "literally a city of the dead". Glasgow native Billy Connolly has said: "Glasgow's a bit like Nashville, Tennessee: it doesn't care much for the living, but it really looks after the dead."

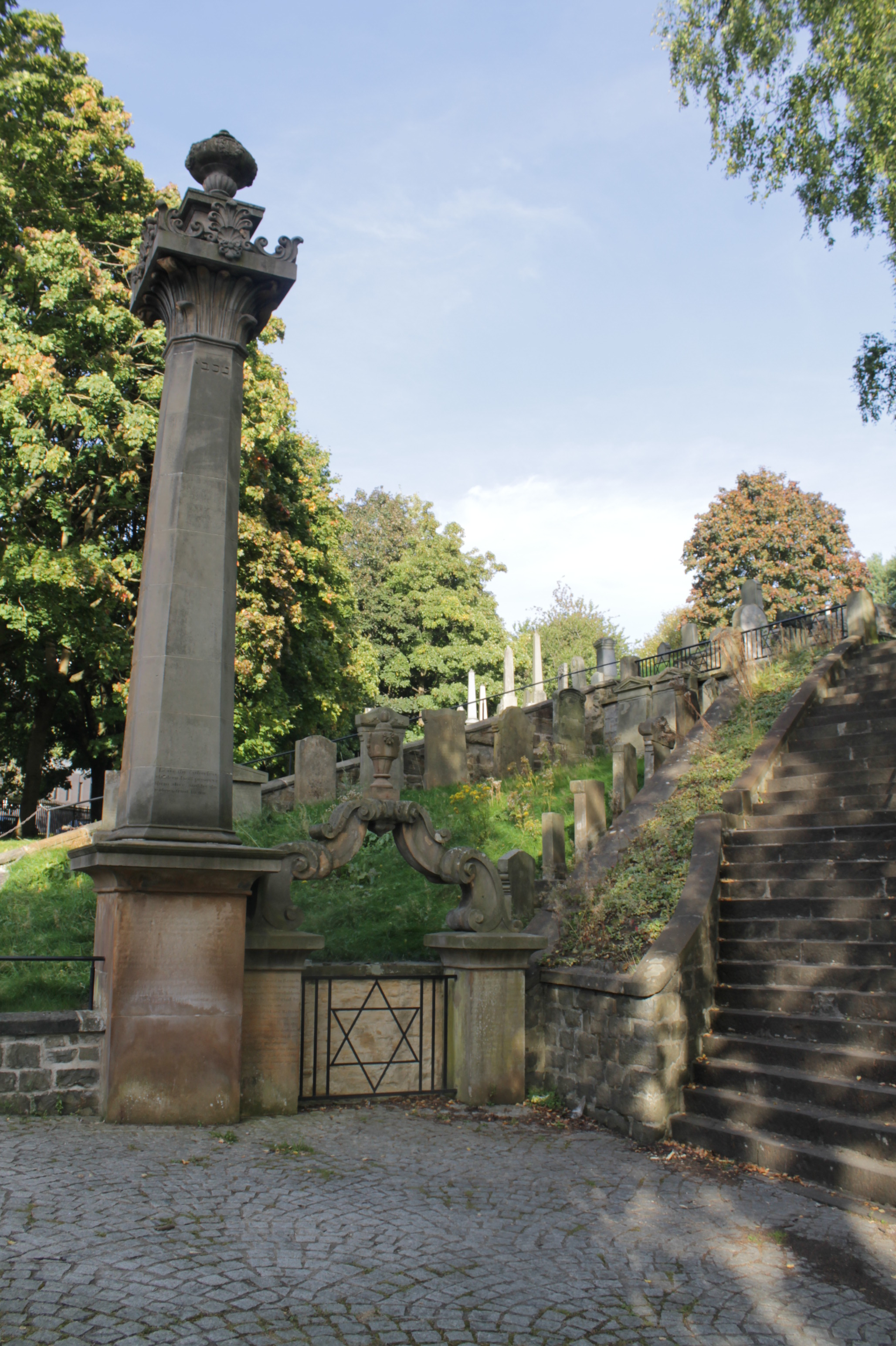
Jewish cemetery, Glasgow Necropolis

== Jewish section ==
As Jewish people were not allowed to be interred within Christian burial grounds, a small area outwith the boundary of the main cathedral graveyard was allocated to them. The ground contains 57 burials.

Before this time, Glaswegian Jews were buried in Edinburgh. Jewish burials took place in the Glasgow Necropolis from 1832 to 1855, after which they were in the Eastern Necropolis.

The Jewish cemetery was restored in 2015.

Oldest of the three monuments

== Women of the Glasgow Royal Infirmary ==
Within the Glasgow Necropolis there are three monuments to 16 nurses and domestic staff from the Glasgow Royal Infirmary who are buried in the cemetery.

The oldest of these headstones lists six menbers of staff who died between 1872 and 1887. Five of them were nurses from outside Glasgow - they were for example from Orkney, Caithness, Midlothian or Peterhead - and they died in their twenties as a result of work-related illnesses.

The burials appear to have been arranged and funded by the hospital and are mostly for staff whose families did not live near Glasgow, or did not have the funds to pay for the funeral.

== War graves ==
Glasgow Necropolis holds graves of 19 Commonwealth service personnel, 15 from World War I and 4 from World War II, that are registered and maintained by the Commonwealth War Graves Commission. The first, and highest ranking, of those buried here is Lieutenant-General Sir James Moncrieff Grierson, who died in August 1914 in France and whose body was repatriated. His grave is in section Primus 38.

== Volunteers ==
The Friends of Glasgow Necropolis is a charity whose aim is to maintain and restore the site. It was founded in 2005. As of June 2025, it has 140 volunteer members and has raised over £100,000 to support its goals. The organisation also runs private tours for visitors to the necropolis.

== Proposed eastern entrance ==
In 2025, Glasgow City Council proposed a new eastern pedestrian entrance into the Glasgow Necropolis from Firpark Street as part of the "Learning Quarter" regeneration plans. The entrance was intended to improve access for residents in Dennistoun and surrounding east-end neighbourhoods.

Local community groups, including Dennistoun Community Council (DCC), supported the proposal. The GCC organised drop-in events to review the design and highlighted the potential benefits of improved pedestrian access and connections to local streets and facilities. Local councillors also backed the plan, noting that it would give east-end residents better access to the Necropolis and create a convenient pedestrian route connecting the Bridge of Sighs to the Cathedral precinct and city centre. Commentary in The Herald described the move as reflecting a shift toward greater public access and community integration, noting that most residents welcomed the proposal.

While the proposal reflects broad local support for improved accessibility and community benefit, Friends of Glasgow Necropolis (FoGN) publicly opposed the entrance. In an open letter to GCC, FoGN warned it could be "detrimental in the long term to the heritage of the cemetery," citing risks of vandalism and antisocial behaviour. The letter does not provide any evidence or data to support these claims.

== Notable statues and sculptures ==
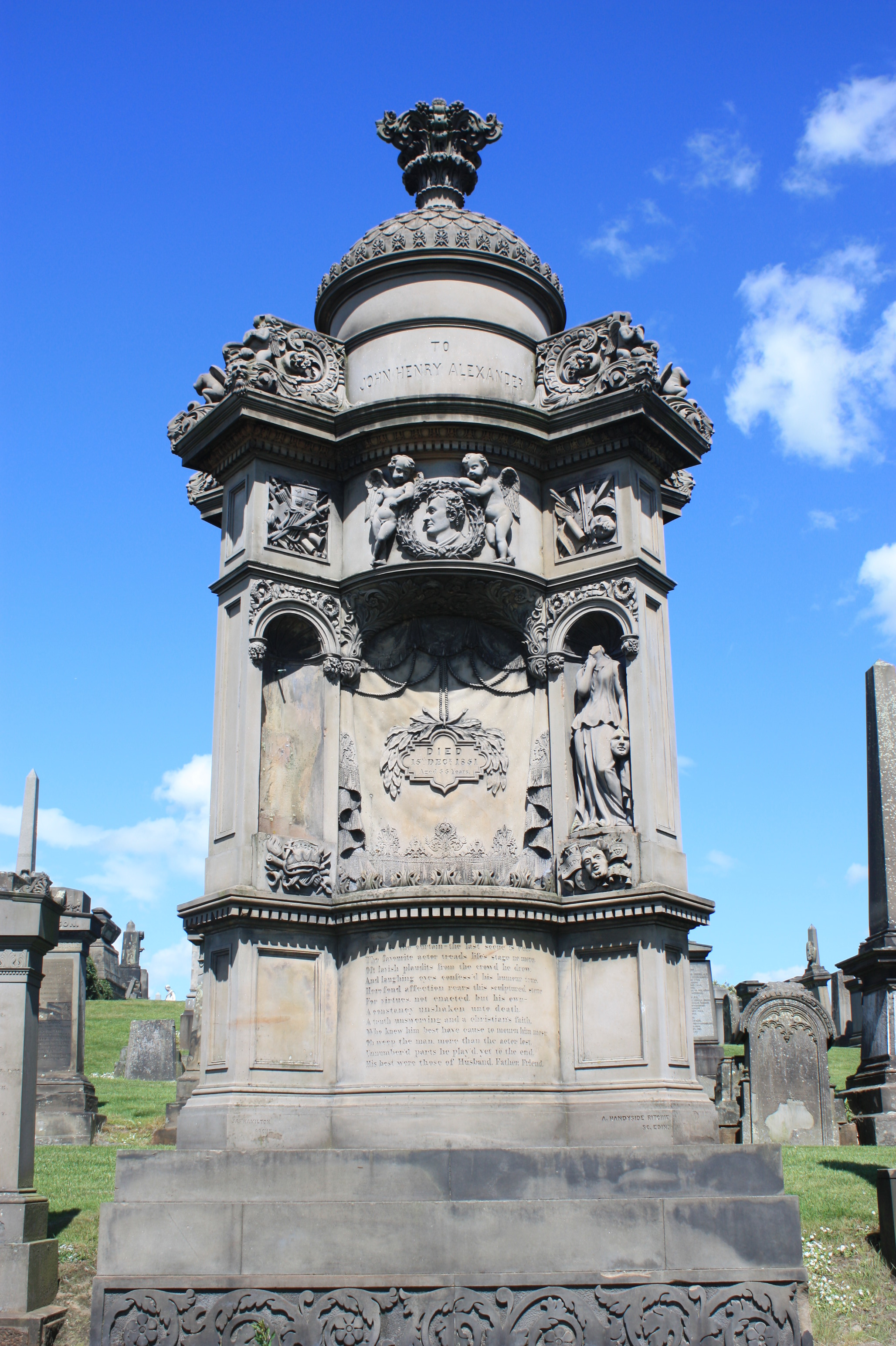
John Henry Alexander Monument

Charles Tennant Monument

Tomb/mausoleum	Statue/sculpture	Designer/artist	Year
Memorial column on summit of the hill	Monument to John Knox	Doric column by Thomas Hamilton and 12 ft (3.7 m) statue by William Warren (carved by Robert Forrest)	1825
Tomb of Mrs Lockhart	Sculpture	William Mossman	1842
Mausoleum of Major Archibald Douglas Monteath	Large tiered octagonal building of neo-Norman design	David Cousin	1842
Tomb of William Motherwell	Marble bust	James Fillans	1851
Tomb of actor-manager John Henry Alexander of the Theatre Royal	Scene representing stage and proscenium arch with flanking figures of "Tragedy" and "Comedy" (As of 2012, one figure is missing and the other is headless.)	James Hamilton, sculpted by Alexander Handyside Ritchie	1851
Houldsworth Mausoleum	Flanking angels and "Hope" and "Charity", with "Faith" visible inside the mausoleum	John Thomas	1854
Tomb of Charles Tennant	Seated marble figure of Charles Tennant of St Rollox	Patric Park	1838
Tomb of Walter Macfarlane, of the Saracen Foundry	Art-nouveau portrait panel	Bertram Mackennal of London	1896
Blackie publishing family tomb	Tomb slab	Talwin Morris (carved by J & G Mossman Ltd.)	1910
Monument to William McGavin	Statue by Robert Forrest	John Bryce	1834
Andrew McCall	Celtic cross to Andrew McCall	Charles Rennie Mackintosh	1888
Monument to Peter Lawrence	Statue of Life with a dashed torch	William Mossman	1840
Tomb to Mrs Margaret Montgomerie	Statues of "Hope" and "Resignation"	J G & W Mossman	1856

== Lords Provosts in the Necropolis ==
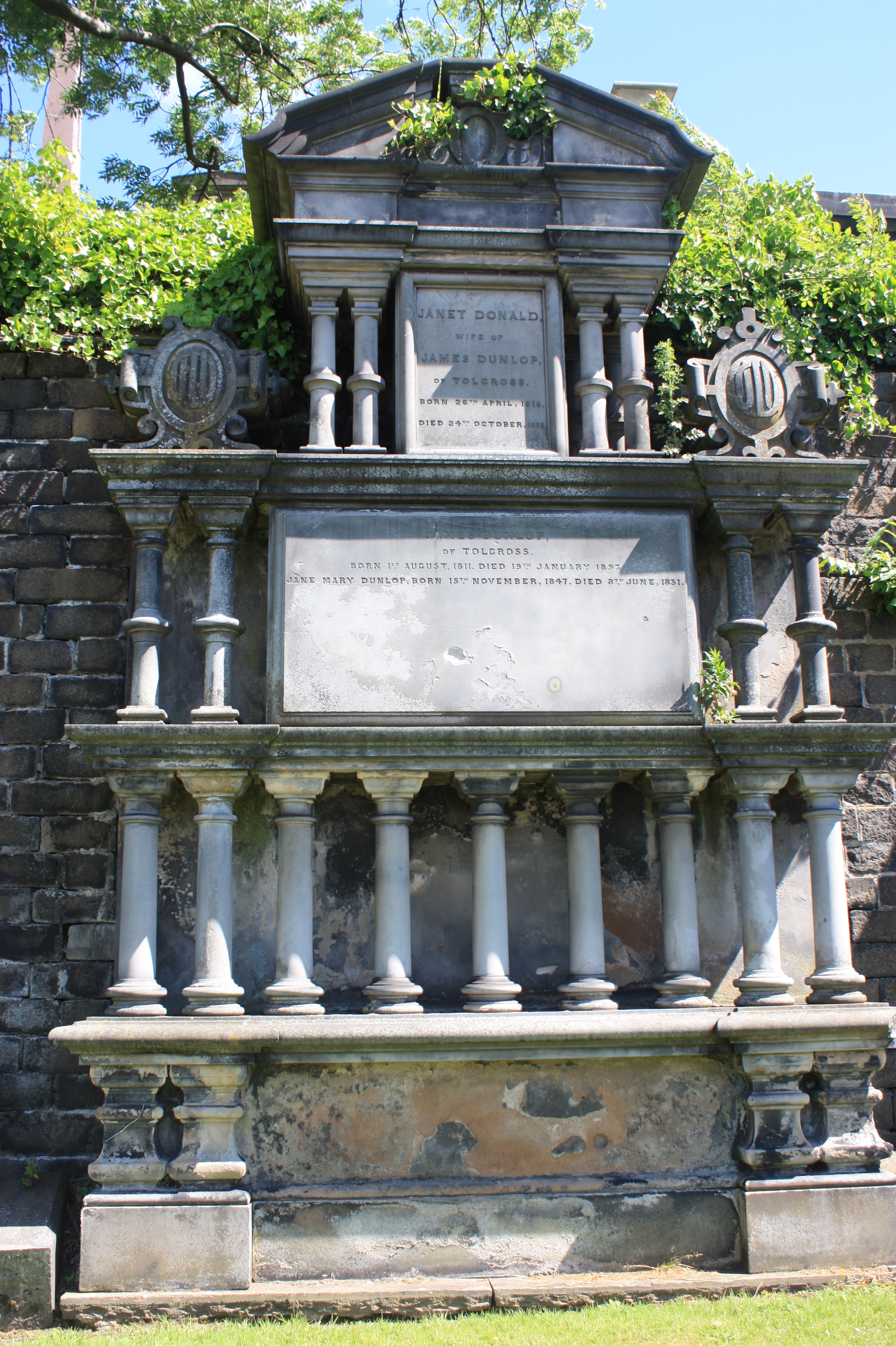
The grave of James Dunlop of Tolcross, Glasgow Necropolis

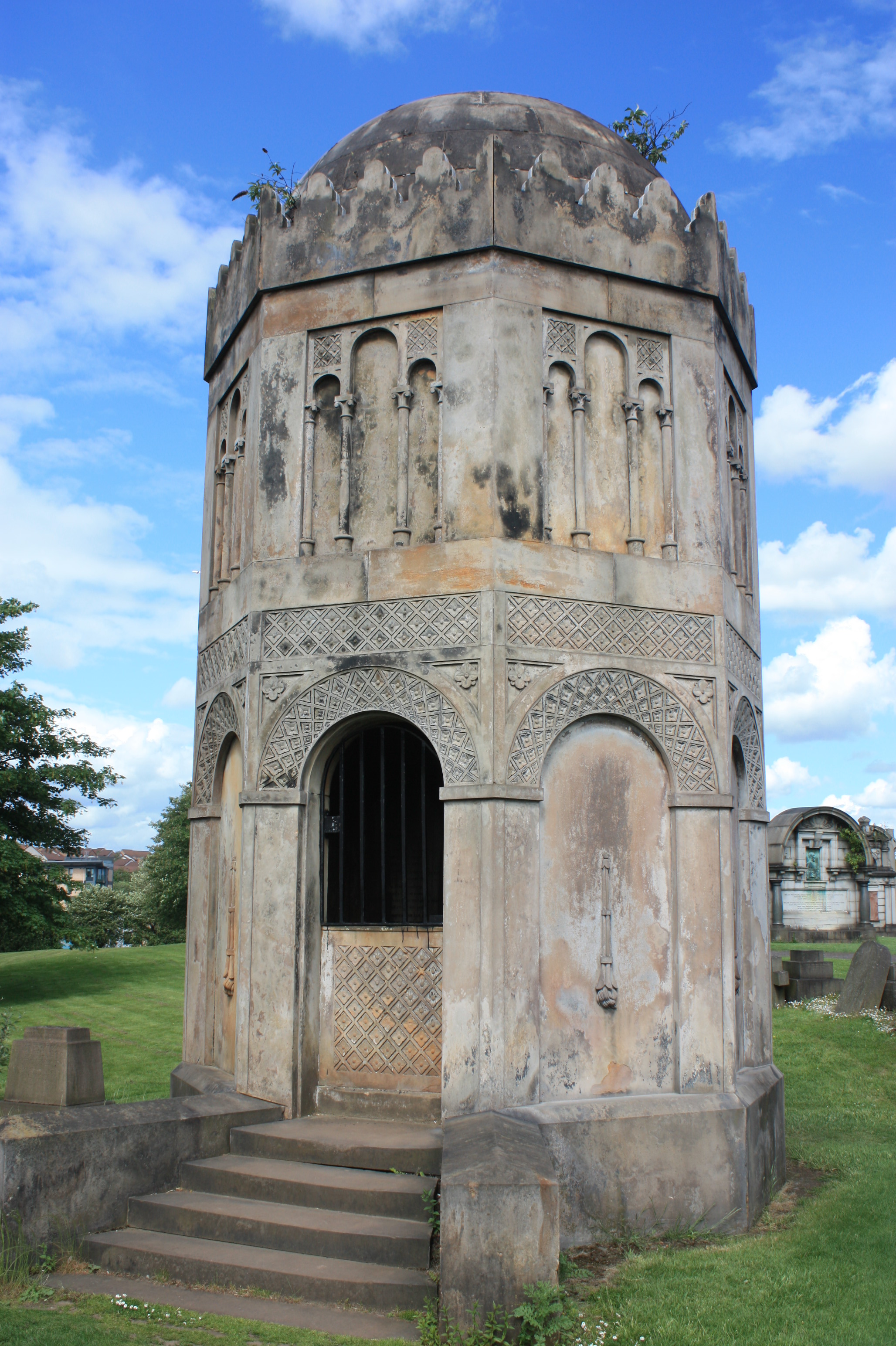
The grave of William Rae Wilson, explorer and author, Glasgow Necropolis

Detail of the Allan memorial

- Peter Clouston
- William Collins
- Sir Thomas Dunlop, 1st Baronet
- James Ewing of Strathleven* Sir William McOnie
- Sir David Mason
- Matthew Walker Montgomery
- Henry Monteith
- Sir Andrew Orr
- Sir David Richmond

== Other burials of note ==
- Alexander Allan, ship owner
- Katherine McCall Anderson, nurse
- Thomas McCall Anderson, Doctor
- William Burns, historian
- Hector Clare Cameron
- Peter Clouston
- Charles Connell, shipbuilder
- Very Rev James Craik, moderator for 1863/4
- Thomas Kennedy Dalziel, discovered Crohn's disease
- William Doleman, golfer
- John Gibb Dunlop, engineer
- Nathaniel Dunlop
- John Elder, shipbuilder, and his philanthropist wife Isabella Elder
- John Graham Gilbert, artist
- John Honeyman, architect
- John Inglis, shipbuilder
- James Jeffray, anatomist
- William Keddie, founder of the Scottish Sunday School system
- Corlinda Lee, Queen of the Gipsies
- William Logan, temperance campaigner
- David MacBrayne
- James McCall, veterinary surgeon
- Rev James Duff MacCulloch
- Sir James MacFarlane (1857–1944), of MacFarlane Lang Biscuits
- John Macgregor, shipbuilder
- David Prince Miller, magician and theatre owner
- William Miller, poet
- George Arthur Mitchell, mining engineer
- William Rae, firefighter
- Sir James Roberton
- Alexander Stephen, shipbuilder
- Peter Stewart, engineer – subject of a bronze sculpture by James Pittendrigh Macgillivray
- John Strang, writer
- John Templeton and James Stewart Templeton, each of James Templeton & Co carpet makers (the latter grave was originally coloured to look like a carpet)
- Charles S. P. Tennent and his brother Hugh Tennent and son Hugh Tennent all of Wellpark Brewery (the graves face the brewery)
- William Thomson, Lord Kelvin
- Rev Ralph Wardlaw
- James George Wilson

== Other memorials ==
- Cheapside Street whisky bond fire
- William Wallace memorial

== See also ==
- Category:Burials at the Glasgow Necropolis
- Southern Necropolis, another large cemetery on the south side of the city
- Thomas Reid's tombstone
