= David Richmond (Lord Provost of Glasgow) =

Scottish businessman (1843–1908)

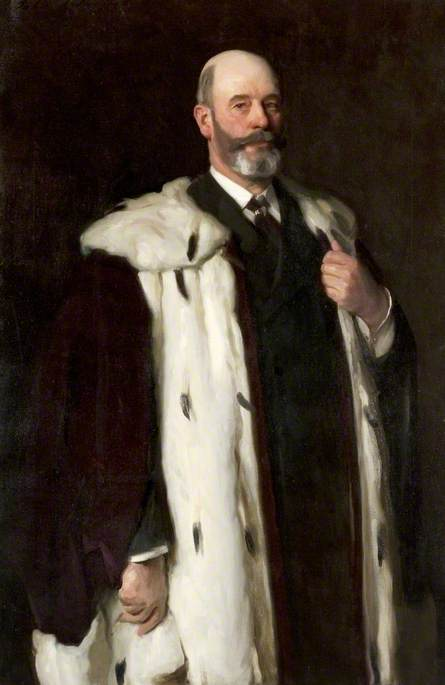
- portrait by John Singer Sargent
- Died: 15 January 1908

Sir David Richmond DL (c. 1843 – 15 January 1908) was a Scottish businessman who served as Lord Provost of Glasgow from 1896 to 1899. He was Director of David Richmond and Co., tube makers (later renamed City Tube Works).

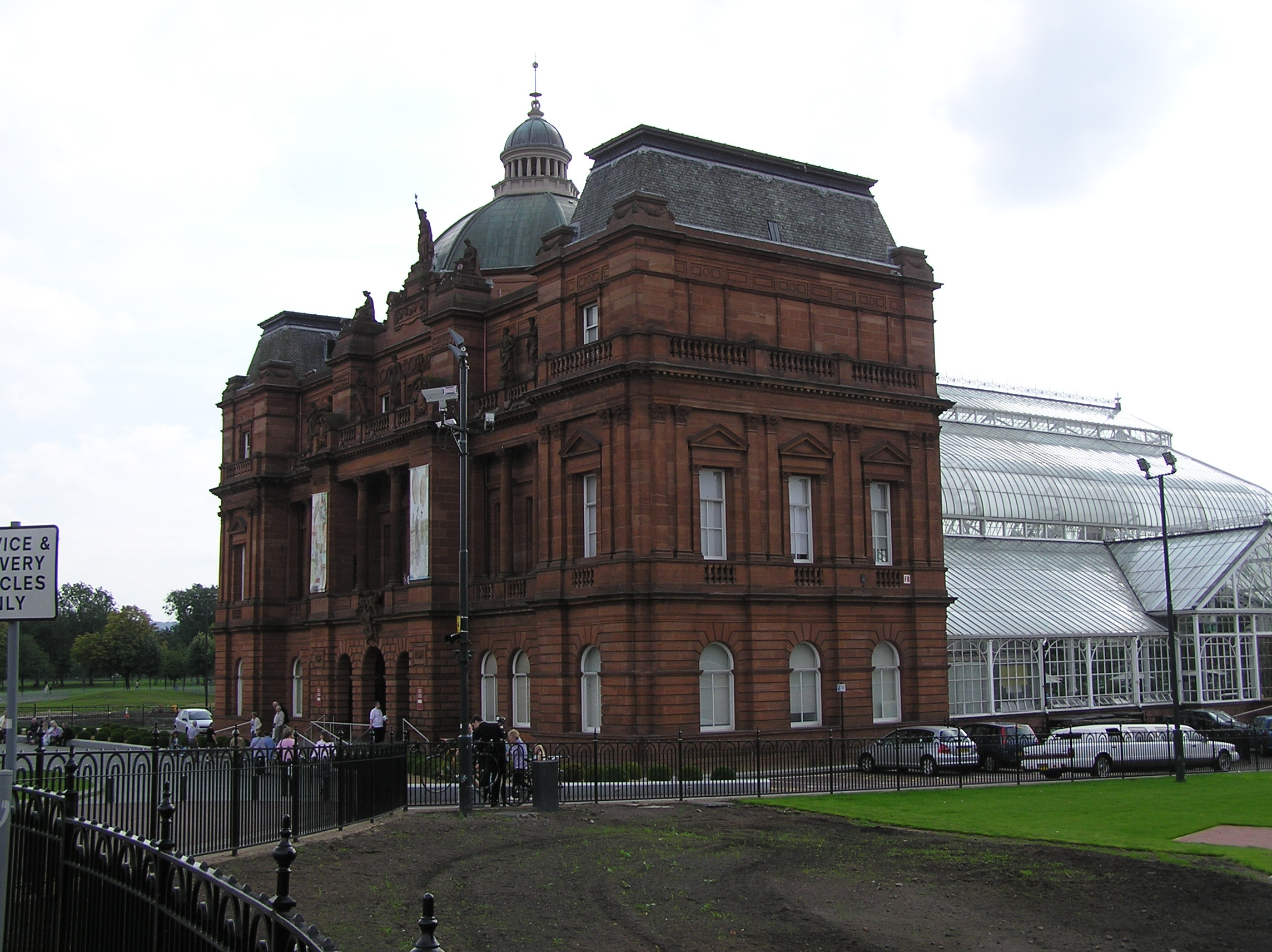
The People's Palace, Glasgow

== Life ==
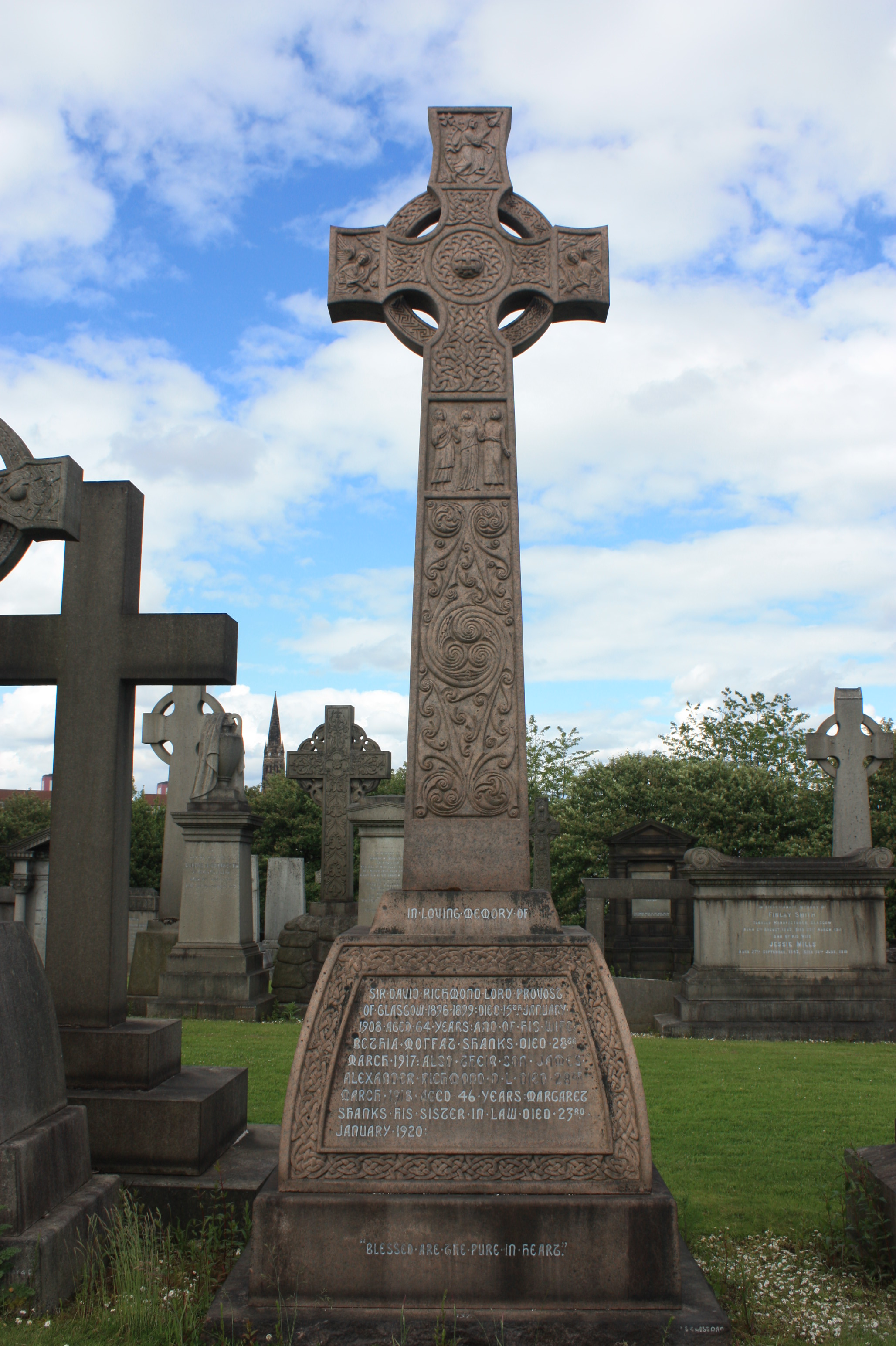
The grave of Sir David Richmond, Glasgow Necropolis

He was born in Deanston, Perthshire in about 1843, the ninth of ten children to James King Richmond and his wife, Mary Lauchlan, both originally from Ayrshire. His parents moved to Glasgow when he was an infant. He was educated at St James Parish School then Glasgow High School.

In 1865, he travelled to Australasia but returned in 1868 to set up his tube works, which was located at Aytoun Court in Glasgow. In 1879, he joined the Glasgow town council representing the 14th ward. In 1891 (while a city Bailie) he attended a large banquet combining a wide range of famous parties together including Sir Henry Irving and his then-secretary Bram Stoker, Buffalo Bill Cody, and Harry Furniss.

His most important contributions as Lord Provost were the building of the People's Palace and laying the foundation of the Kelvingrove Art Gallery and Museum. He was also greatly involved in the expansion of electricity through the city and building of several public baths and fire stations. He also organised the building of Tollcross Park and Richmond Park (named in his honour). He was knighted in 1899 by Queen Victoria.

By 1900, his company had expanded and had premises at both Broomloan Road in Govan 35 Rose Street in the Hutchesontown district. Sir David was then living at Broompark in Pollokshields.

He died at 53 Albert Drive in Glasgow on 15 January 1908 and is buried in the Glasgow Necropolis. The grave lies in the linear sections on the east side of the upper plateau. The Celtic cross marking the grave is by J & G Mossman.

== Family ==
In 1870, he married Bethia Moffat Shanks (d.1917), daughter of Robert Shanks of Glasgow.

Their son James Alexander Richmond died in 1918.

== Artistic recognition ==
He was portrayed in office by John Singer Sargent, the leading artist of his day.
