= Patrick Brewster =

Scottish minister

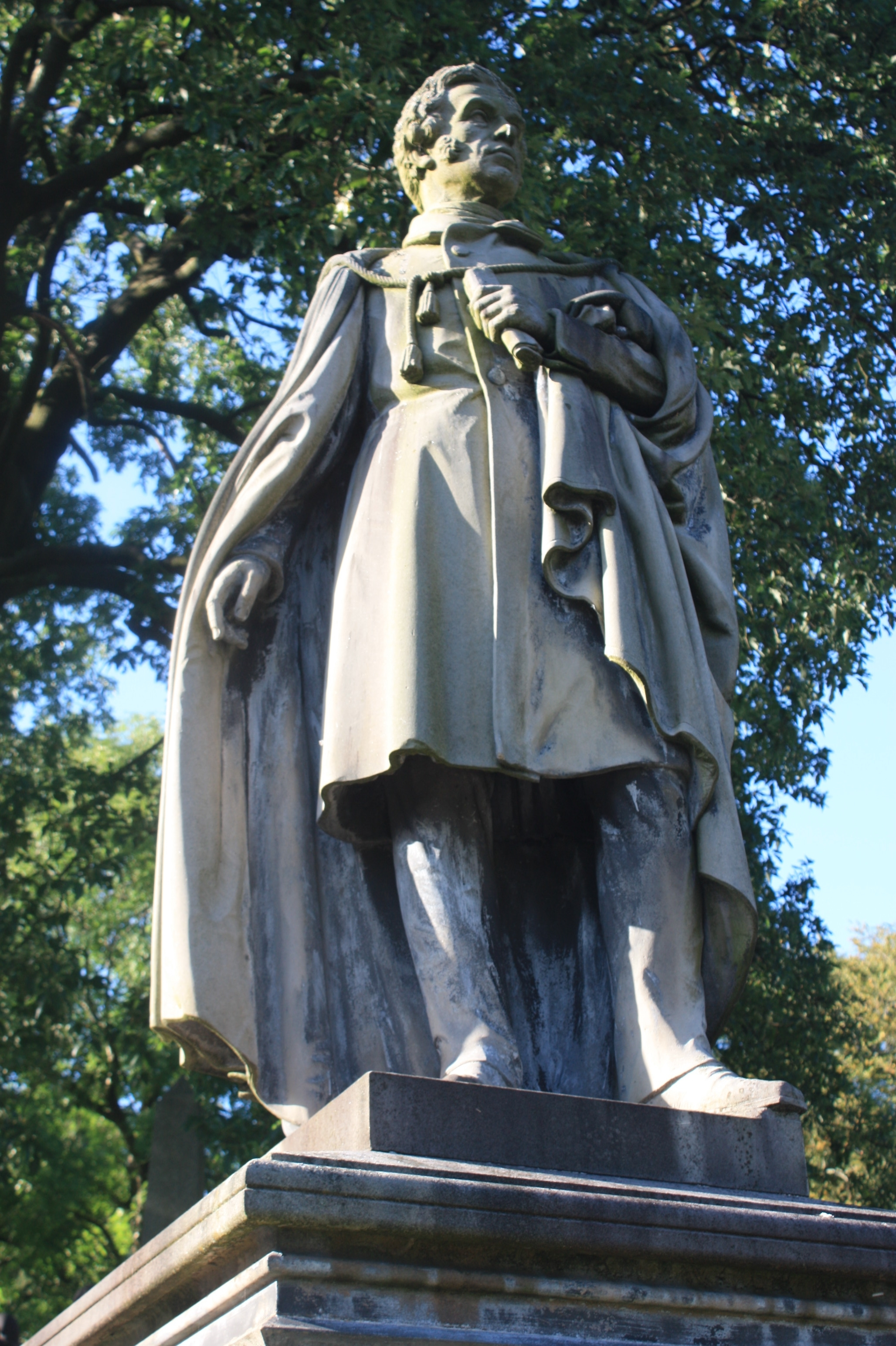
Monument to Rev Patrick Brewster, Woodside Cemetery, Paisley by John G. Mossman

Patrick Brewster (20 December 1788 – 26 March 1859) was a Scottish minister largely based in Paisley.

== Life ==
Brewster was born on 20 December 1788, the youngest of the four sons of Mr. James Brewster, and younger brother of Sir David Brewster. In accordance with the wishes of his father, who had destined all his sons to the ministry of the Scottish church, Patrick devoted himself to theology, and received license as a probationer from the presbytery of Fordoun on 26 March 1817.

In August following he was presented by the Marquis of Abercorn to the second charge of the Abbey Church of Paisley, to which he was ordained on 10 April 1818. He continued to occupy this preferment for nearly forty-one years, and died at his residence at Craigie Linn, near Paisley, on 26 March 1859.

Brewster was a favourite of the working classes, and received a public funeral (4 April 1859). In 1863 a monument to his memory was erected by public subscription in Paisley cemetery. The statue placed on the monument is by John Mossman. The monument is in a prominent location, facing the entrance, placed at a split in the paths on the main avenue.

== Works ==
As a preacher Brewster enjoyed an almost unrivalled local fame. His political views were extreme; he was a 'moral-force chartist,' and took an active share in the plans for carrying out the chartist programme. His whole life was one continuous succession of exciting disputes upon public questions, or with the heritors, the parish authorities, or the presbytery. This polemical spirit may be traced in the volume of his sermons entitled The Seven Chartist and Military Discourses libelled by the Marquis of Abercorn and other Heritors of the Abbey Parish. To which are added four other Discourses formerly published, with one or two more as a Specimen of the Author's mode of treating other Scripture Topics. With an Appendix, Paisley, &c., 1843. Brewster advocated the abolition of the slave trade, the repeal of the corn laws, temperance, and a national system of education. He published three single Sermons, and a vindication, in two parts, of the rights of the poor of Scotland 'against the misrepresentations of the editor of the "Glasgow Post and Reformer."' He was also a contributor to the Edinburgh Cyclopædia, and furnished a 'Description of a Fossil Tree found in a Quarry at Nitshill' to the ninth volume of the Transactions of the Royal Society of Edinburgh. He incurred some odium for not, like his brothers, leaving the established Church of Scotland at the time of the disruption of 1843, when he was one of 'the Forty.'
