= William Logan (temperance campaigner) =

Scottish missionary

- Born: 1813; Damhead, Lanarkshire, Scotland
- Died: 16 September 1879 (aged 66); Glasgow, Scotland
- Occupation: Missionary
- Spouse: Janet Lorimer
- Children: Sophie Logan, William Logan
- Website: gdl.cdlr.strath.ac.uk/mlemen/mlemen050.htm

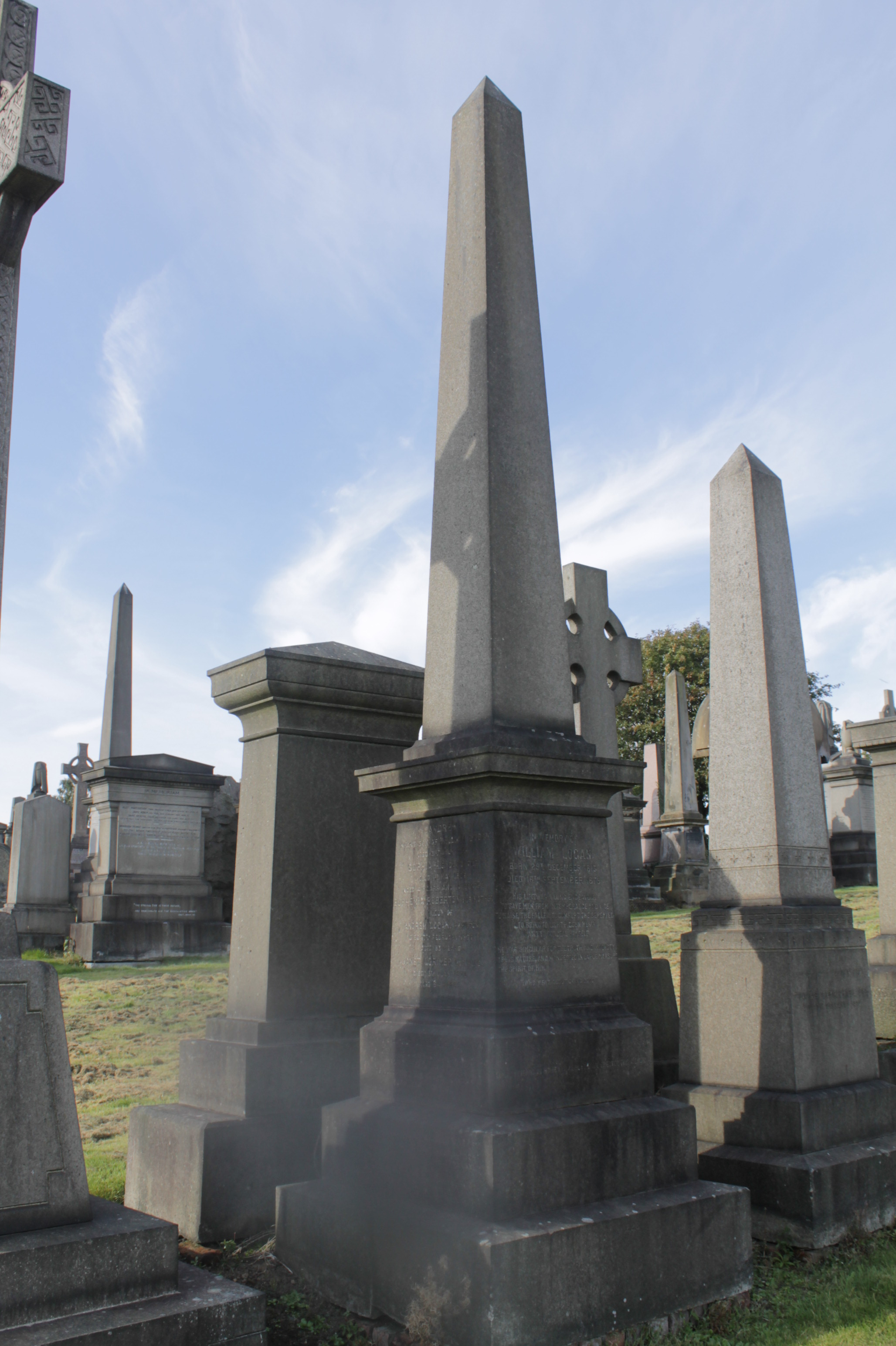
The grave of William Logan, Glasgow Necropolis

William Logan (1813 – 16 September 1879) was a Scottish missionary, author and temperance movement activist.

== Life ==
William Logan was born on 29 December 1813 the son of Andrew Logan, a weaver, and Euphemia Logan of Damhead, near Hamilton, South Lanarkshire in Scotland.

On 5 November 1844, Logan cofounded the Scottish Temperance League, the first non-denominational total abstinence society in Scotland.

In Glasgow he worked as a missionary (giving relief to the poor of the parish) based at the Seaman's Hall at Port Dundas. He was living at 61 Bardowie Street in the Possil Park district of the city in later life.

He died on 16 September 1879 and is buried in the Glasgow Necropolis. The grave lies in one of the north-south rows in the south-eastern section (known as Epsilon) of the upper plateau.

== Family ==
During his first stay in Rochdale England, from 1840–1842, he probably met his future wife, Janet Lorimer (born 1826). In 1850, Logan married Janet Lorimer at Providence Chapel in Rochdale. By 1851, the couple was living at Manningham, near Bradford, Yorkshire. Their daughter Sophie, was born on 12 June 1851.

The family later moved to Glasgow, where they resided at 18 Abbotsford Place. On 1 May 1856, Sophie died at age four after suffering for several weeks from a gastric illness. Sophie's death led Logan to write Brief Notice of a Short Life as a preface to Words of Comfort for Parents Bereaved of Little Children, a widely circulated collection of essays edited by Logan.

A second child, William Logan, was born in Glasgow in about 1855.

== Writing ==
- The principles of teetotalism maintained and illustrated, or, The nature, causes, evils, and remedy of intemperance a lecture, the substance of which has been delivered in Mossley, Lees, Delph, Rochdale, and Royton, 1839
- The deplorable condition of woman: exemplified in an exposure of the brothels of London, Manchester, Birmingham, Rochdale, Leeds, Sheffield, Edinburgh, Glasgow, and other manufacturing towns in Great Britain: showing the horrors of female prostitution existing therein, 1840
- An Exposure, from Personal Observation, of Female Prostitution in London, Leeds and Rochdale, and Especially in the City of Glasgow with remarks on the cause, extent, results and remedy of the evil, 1843
- An affecting story, 1845
- An astounding fact or two for Sabbath School teachers who support the drinking system, 1848
- Moral Statistics of Glasgow, 1849
- Words of Comfort for Parents Bereaved of Little Children, 1869
- Early Heroes of the Temperance Reformation, 1873
