= John Strang (writer) =

Writer

John Strang (10 February 1795 – 8 December 1863), born in Glasgow, was a writer and traveller; later in life he had a career in civic affairs in the city.

== Life ==
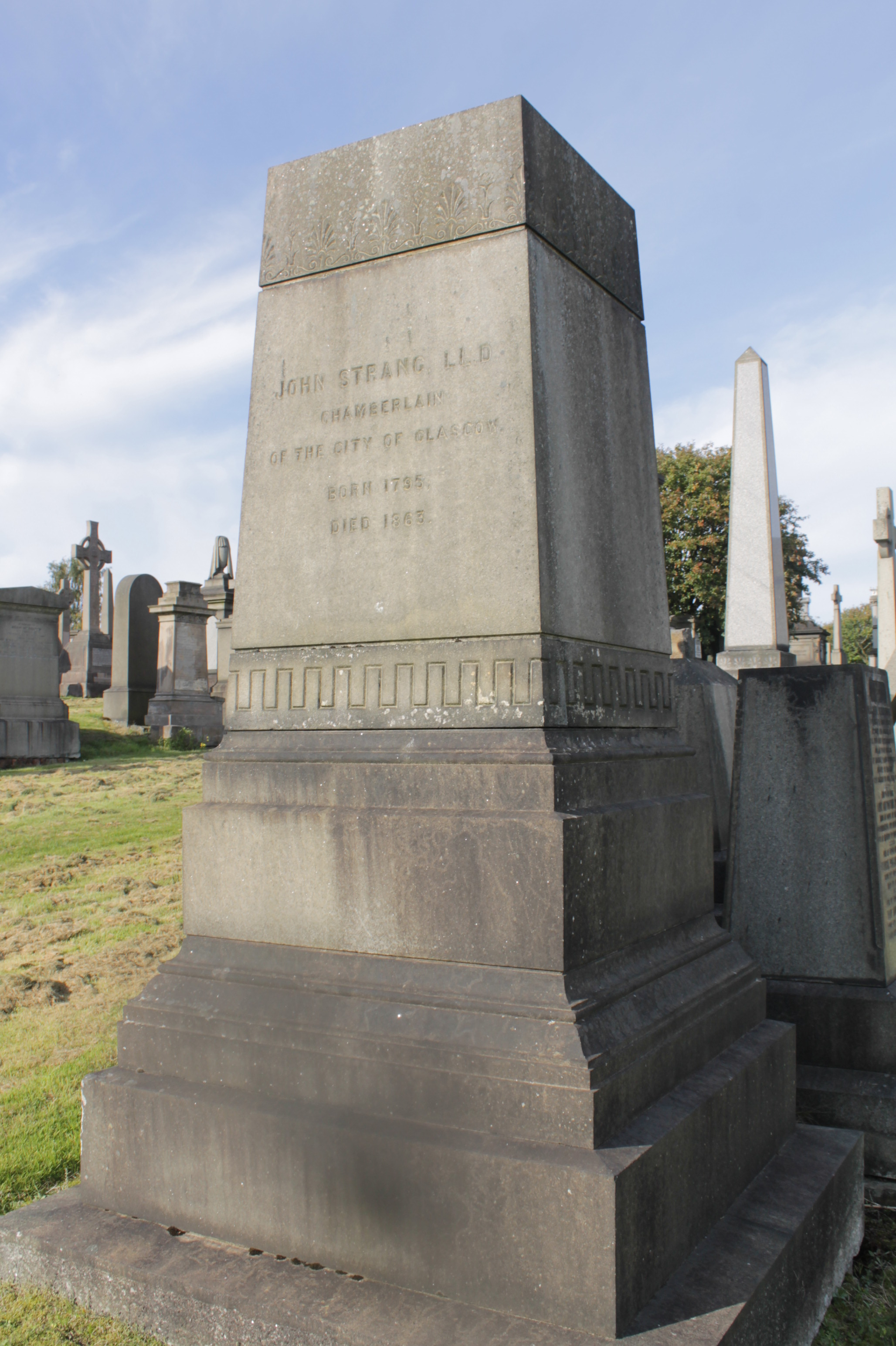
The grave of John Strang, Glasgow Necropolis

Strang was the son of a wine merchant in Glasgow. He received a liberal education, and his studies particularly included French and German. When he was fourteen his father died, and in due course he inherited the business, for which he had little interest. In 1817 he spent some time in France and Italy, which gave him a liking for continental travel. When at home, he began to contribute to periodicals tales and poems translated from French and German. His youthful translations from the German of E. T. A. Hoffmann and others, were collected into a volume, and this introduced him to men of letters in London and in France and Germany.

Having artistic as well as literary tastes, Strang sketched some of the outstanding features of Old Glasgow. In 1831 his pamphlet Necropolis Glasguensis appeared, advocating the site of a new garden cemetery; this eventually became the Glasgow Necropolis. In that year Strang made a long tour of Germany, and from there he wrote many letters which were subsequently published. He became editor in 1832 of The Day, a short-lived daily literary paper published by William Motherwell, to which he contributed articles. He was a regular contributor to the Scots Times from 1826 to 1831, and a literary critic for The Scotsman from 1832 to 1833.

In 1834 he was appointed City Chamberlain of Glasgow, and he held the office for thirty years. He regulated the finances of the city, and helped to improve its architectural features. He read before the British Association at various meetings papers on the city and harbour of Glasgow, and he prepared for the corporation elaborate and accurate reports on the "Vital Statistics of Glasgow", and on the census of the city as shown in 1841, 1851, and 1861. He wrote the article "Glasgow" for the eighth edition of the Encyclopædia Britannica.

In recognition of his literary merit and public services, the University of Glasgow conferred on him in 1843 the honorary degree of LL.D.

In later years he lived at 22 Woodside Place, a fashionable townhouse east of Kelvingrove Park.

He spent his last summer in France and Germany, contributing to the Glasgow Herald a series of letters from "an invalid in search of health". He died in Glasgow on 8 December 1863, and was buried at the Glasgow Necropolis. The grave lies in a north-south row in the south-east section of the upper plateau.

== Family ==
In December 1842, Strang married Elizabeth Anderson, daughter of Dr William Anderson, a distinguished Glasgow physician. She survived him. They had no children.

== Publications ==
- As "Geoffrey Crayon", Strang published in 1830 A Glance at the Exhibition of Works of Living Artists, under the Patronage of the Glasgow Dilettante Society.
- In 1836 he published, in two volumes, Germany in 1831, which soon reached a second edition.
- His most important work is Glasgow and Its Clubs, published in 1856. This is a valuable record of the society and manners of western Scotland in the second half of the eighteenth century. There were two subsequent editions, in 1857 and 1864.
- In 1863 Travelling Notes of an Invalid in Search of Health appeared, the preface to which Strang wrote ten days before his death.
