= Matthew Walker Montgomery =

Lord Provost of Glasgow 1923-1926

Sir Matthew Walker Montgomery DL (18 April 1859 – 8 August 1933) was a Scottish businessman who served as Lord Provost of Glasgow from 1923 to 1926.

== Life ==
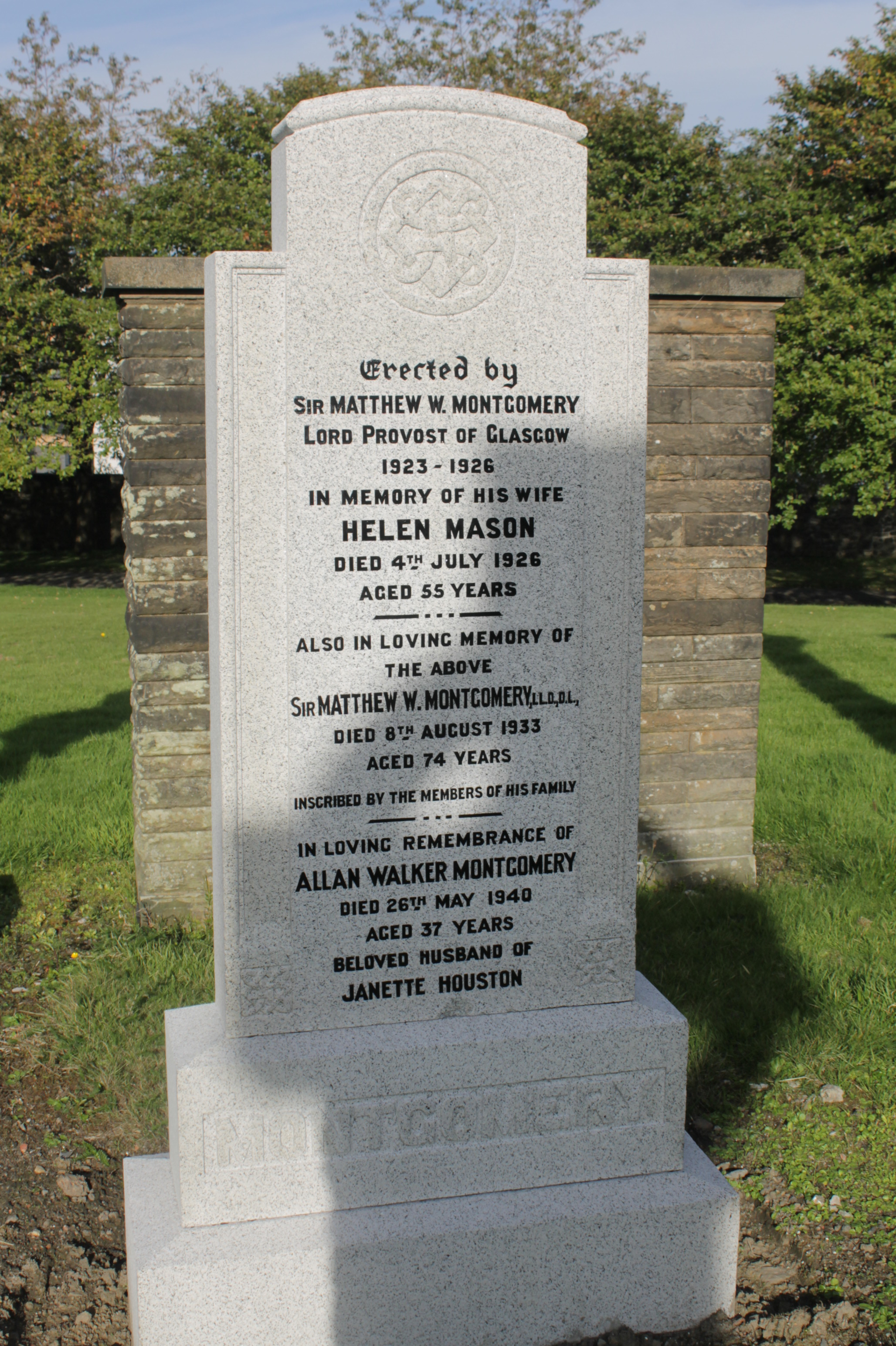
Restored grave of Sir M W Montgomery, Glasgow Necropolis

He was born in Hutchesontown, Glasgow, the son of Daniel Montgomery and Mary Sommerville Walker. The family lived at 41 Adelphi Street in Glasgow, on the south bank of the River Clyde. The family business, making cork, was originally based at 1 Muirhead Street in the Gorbals district.

He worked in his father's firm of D. Montgomery & Son, cork manufacturers and merchants, based at 10 East Clyde Street at the turn of the century, on the north side of the River Clyde opposite the family home.

From 1911 to 1913, he was Grand Master of the Glasgow Star Masonic Lodge (no.219). He then lived at 34 Dalziel Drive in the Pollokshields district.

He was painted in office by Charles Haslewood Shannon. After serving as Lord Provost of Glasgow from 1923 to 1926, he was knighted in the 1926 New Year Honours. He was succeeded as Lord Provost by Sir David Mason.

He died in Glasgow and is buried in the Glasgow Necropolis. The grave lies to the south-east of the upper plateau. It was restored in 2019.

== Family ==
He was married to Helen Mason (1871-1926).
