= Futsal in Scotland =

- Country: Scotland
- Governing body: Scottish Football Association
- National team(s): Men's national team Women's national team

National competitions
- Scottish Futsal League

International competitions
- FIFA Futsal World Cup

Futsal in Scotland has been played in Perth since 1997.

The first league had 4 teams and it went from strength to strength.

In 1999 Youth Futsal coaching started in Perth under the auspices of the now-defunct Scottish Futsal Federation and was headed by Steve Chatila, one of the 3 people running SFF. The coaching sessions were initially formed so as to ensure a conveyor belt supply of young players into the adult league in Perth, after it was analysed that implementing this would ensure the long-term survival of the adult league.

In 2000 Mark Potter formed the Scottish Futsal League.

In late 2001 there was a parting of the ways as the SFF split into 2 sections, Adult & Youth with Steve Chatila and Scott Robertson leaving the SFF to take youth Futsal side in a new direction, and Mark Potter taking on the Adult side.

In 2001 the SFL was the first officially recognised Futsal League in Scotland (based in Perth) – by the Scottish Amateur FA – in 2001 with Chair Mark Potter

27 December 2001

The SFA today became the first of the British associations to give formal recognition to Futsal, the regulated version of five-a-side football.

At a tournament in Perth, SFA Chief Executive David Taylor and Football Development Director Craig Brown were on hand to demonstrate the skills of futsal, which is a form of football now recognised and regulated by FIFA and UEFA.

Following the demonstration at the Bells Sports Centre, the SFA hopes that futsal will become popular in Scotland, with the prospect of international competitions in the future.

Now the game is set to develop in Scotland and the SFA was the first of the four British associations to give official recognition to this five-a-side version of football. Futsal is an internationally recognised sport, governed by FIFA and UEFA.

Perth is now the oldest continuously running Futsal League in the United Kingdom which was created by Mark Potter and Stephen Chatila + one other.

In 2005 the Scottish Futsal League joined up with the Futsal Premier League to help promote Futsal across the UK.

The Futsal Premier League (FPL) initiated a regional league in Edinburgh in November 2005. The Scottish National Futsal League, FPL Scotland, followed in 2006.[3] FPL Scotland is sponsored by Tennent's, who have given away over 50,000 futsal balls, and now also sponsor the National Football Team. Additional support came from the Scottish Football Association and kit manufacturer Joma. The FPL Scotland is divided into three Series, A, B and C, as opposed to two in England. Winners of the FPL Scotland Serie A progress to the UEFA Futsal Cup

In 2006, eight teams played in the first FPL Scotland Serie A:

Aberdeen Cosmos Dundee Dynamos Edinburgh United Fair City Santos(Perth) Glasgow City Glasgow Maccabi Inverness Wanderers Perth North Muirton

Fair City Santos, Scotland's first UEFA Futsal Entrants played in the first preliminary round of the UEFA Futsal Cup, against Adana from Armenia, Futsal Mad Max from Finland, and Roubaix from France, although they failed to progress to the next stage

Since 2006 the League Champions side has played in UEFA Futsal Cup.

In 2008 the Scottish Futsal League parted ways with the Futsal Premier League.

In 2014 New structure created in partnership with the SFA and SAFA in 2014 with new regional leagues formed (Aberdeen, Dundee, Edinburgh, Glasgow and Stirling in addition to the long-running Perth league).

2014/15 held first finals weekend where each regional winner competed over 3 days in a mini league to declare the Scottish champions - Fair City Santos

In 2014 saw the creation of the first Scotland National Futsal team with Mark Potter as its first head coach.

In 2015 Scotland National Futsal Team played in the UEFA Futsal Euros Preliminary Round held in Sweden.

2015/16 second year of finals weekend with a new champion declared for the first time outside of Perth - Wattcell of SFL Edinburgh.

2016 saw the Launch of a new national Scottish Cup won by Fair City Santos.

2016 under head coach Mark Potter, Scotland National Futsal team played in the first Home nations futsal tournament held in Wales.

2016/17 launch of the first ever national league held over 12 weeks in one venue. Winners TMT of SFL Glasgow

2017 Scotland National Futsal team played in the UEFA Futsal Euros preliminary round in Georgia

2017 under interim head coach Gerry Mcmonagle, Scotland National Futsal team played in Home nations futsal tournament held in Edinburgh Scotland.

2017/18 launch of the SFL 'Super League' as standalone league comprising 10 clubs.

2018 under new head coach Scott Chaplain, Scotland National Futsal team played in Home nations futsal tournament held in Northern Ireland.

2019 under new head coach Scott Chaplain, Scotland National Futsal team played in the FIFA Futsal World Cup preliminary round in Bosnia and Herzegovina

To date, there is no youth futsal league (hopefully this will change)

== Current Adult League ==
Season 2018/19

SFL Superleague

Current Champions - Wattcell

=== Venues ===
- University of Highlands and Islands - Perth College - Academy of Sport and Wellbeing
- Ally McCoist Complex - East Kilbride
- Dundee International Sport Centre
- The Peak - Stirling

=== Superleague teams ===
- Wattcell Futsal Club
- Fair City Santos
- Polonia Dundee
- Five Cities
- Polonia Edinburgh
- Dundee Futsal
- Glasgow City FS
- University of Edinburgh
- PYF Saltires
- TMT

== SFL Regional Leagues ==
=== SFL-Dundee ===
Current Champions - Dundee West

Venues - Dundee International Sport Centre & Lynch Centre

==== SFL-Dundee Teams ====
- Dundee West
- Dundee West FD
- Montrose
- Dryburgh
- Dundee City
- Dundee Stars
- Dundee Celtic
- Dundee University
- St Andrews University

=== SFL-Edinburgh ===
Current Champions - Wattcell Boca

==== Venues ====
- ORIAM
- Tynecastle High School

== Championship Division ==
- Phoenix Edinburgh
- Galacticos
- Nerazuri
- Lothian Balompie
- Edinburgh Deaf
- RMT Sacachipas
- Corstorphine Dynamo
- Dalkeith Thistle
- Informatics

== Development Division ==
- Wattcell Boca
- Polonia Edinburgh B
- University of Edinburgh B
- Dalkeith Cardo
- UofE Boteco do Brasil
- Nerazuri B

=== SFL-Perth ===
Current Champions - Zenit St Johnstoun

Venue - Bells Sport Centre

==== SFL-Perth Teams ====
- Oakbank Santos
- PYF Academy
- Zenit St. Johnstoun FC
- Real Perth Futsal
- PYF Development
- AC Perth
- Letham Santos
- Breadalbane
- The Old Lady
- Cherrybank
- Body Academy

=== SFL-Glasgow ===
Current Champions - Glasgow City FS

==== Venues ====
- Hutcheson Grammar
- City of Glasgow College

==== SFL-Glasgow Teams ====
- TMT B
- Glasgow City B
- Edusport Futsal
- Cardo Club De Futsal
- St Vincent Deaf
- Strathclyde Futsal
- Whitletts Victoria
- Glasgow Deaf
- Persian Athletic
- TCB Futsal
- Glasgow Futsal
- City of Glasgow College
- TJ Slovak Lads
- Lanarkshire Deaf
