= William Rae (firefighter) =

Scottish firefighter

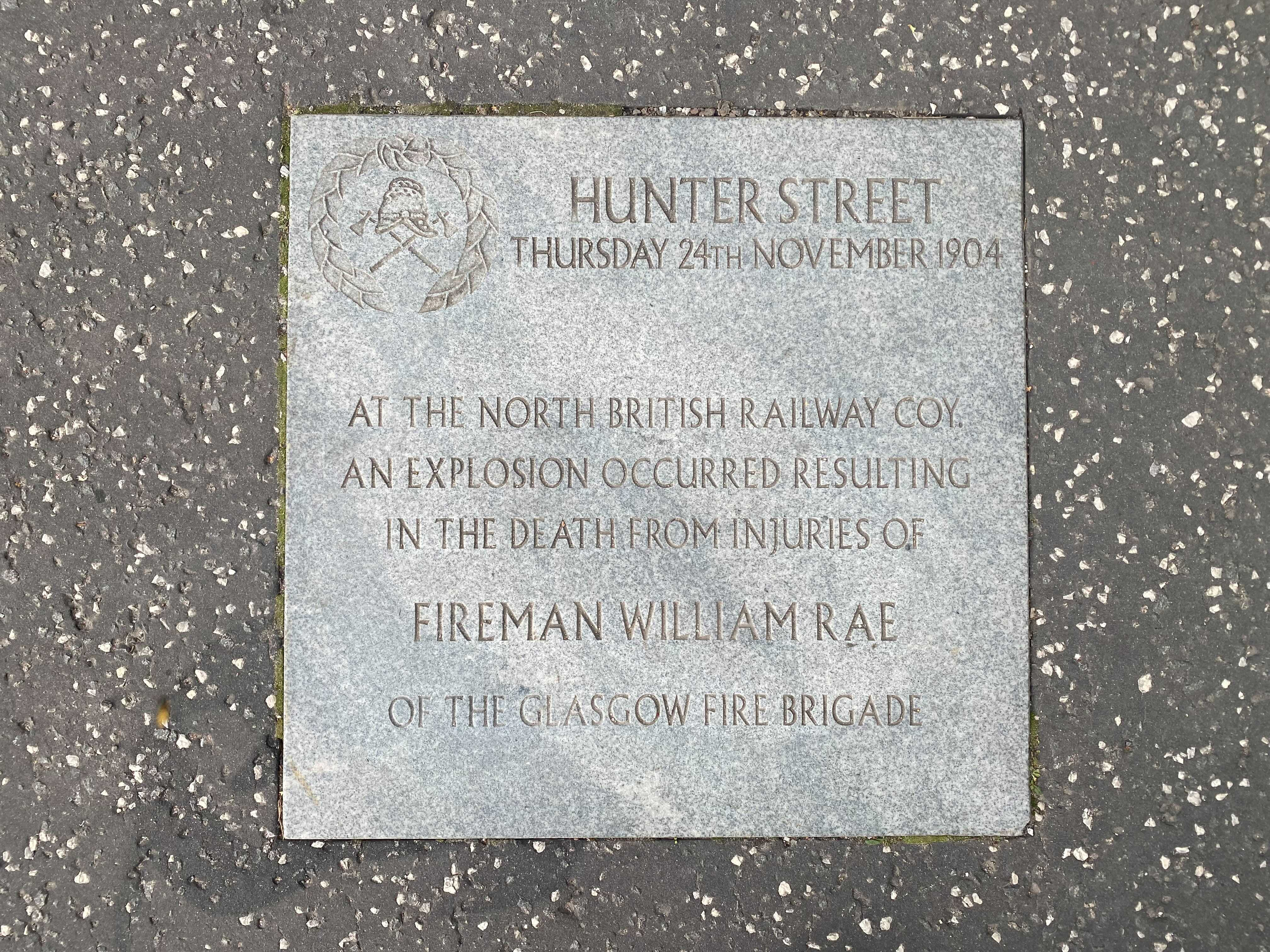
- Memorial plaque, Hunter Street, Glasgow
- Born: 1869
- Died: 27 November 1904 (aged 34–35)
- Cause of death: Injuries from fire fighting
- Resting place: Glasgow Necropolis
- Monuments: Memorial plaque on Hunter Street, Glasgow
- Occupation: Firefighter
- Years active: 1891 to 1904

William Rae (1869 – 27 November 1904) was a Scottish firefighter who served in the Glasgow Fire Brigade.

Rae responded to tackle a fire on North British Railway premises in Glasgow on 24 November 1904 where he was seriously injured by an exploding boiler. He died of his injuries three days later.

Rae was memorialized in Scottish Fire and Rescue Service's Firefighters' Heritage Trail where one of the twelve plaques is dedicated to him.

== Personal life ==
Rae was born in 1869. At the time of his death in 1904 he was married and had four children; the oldest child was 10 years old.

== Fire fighting career ==
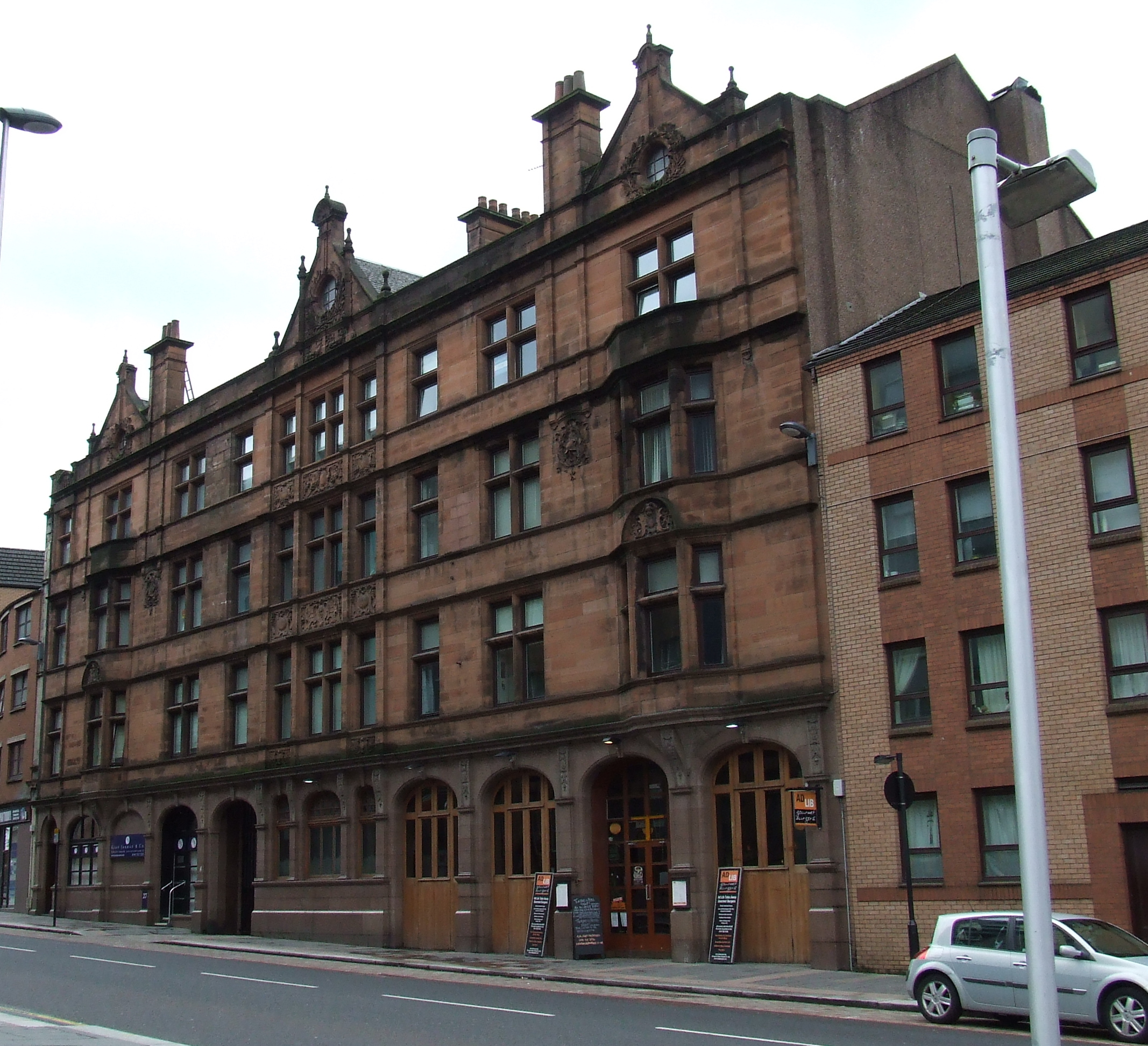
Site of the Ingram Fire Station, Glasgow, 2010

Rae, a carpenter by trade, joined the fire service in November 1891 and rose through the rank to become a merit class fireman. From 1897 to 1904 he was in charge of the joiner's shop.

In 1904, Rae was stationed at the newly opened Central Fire Station at Ingram Street, Glasgow.

== Hunter Street fire ==
On 24 November 1904 Rae and other members of the Glasgow Fire Brigade attended a fire on North British Railway company premises in Hunter Street, Glasgow, Scotland. The seat of the fire was the gas storage area.

Exploding gas cylinders burnt Rae from the shoulders upwards, although his eyesight was not damaged.

== Death ==
On 27 November 1904, at the age of 35 years, Rae died of his injuries at Glasgow Royal Infirmary.

Lord Provost Sir John Ure Primrose as well as representatives from Edinburgh, Paisley and Greenock fire brigades attended Rae's funeral on 30 November 1904. His coffin was carried by horse and ladder carriage to the Glasgow Necropolis, where he was buried.

A memorial plaque for Rae is part of the Fire Fighter Heritage Trail on Hunter Street, Glasgow.
