= William Keddie =

Scottish newspaper editor and scientist

William Keddie FRSE (1809–1877) was a Scottish newspaper editor and scientist. Although now a method taken for granted, he was one of the first to advocate teaching of Chemistry by each student conducting their own experiments (rather than purely observing the teacher). He left a large collection of manuscripts to Glasgow University. He also formed the basis of running Scottish Sunday Schools, in a format which ran until the mid 20th century.

== Life ==
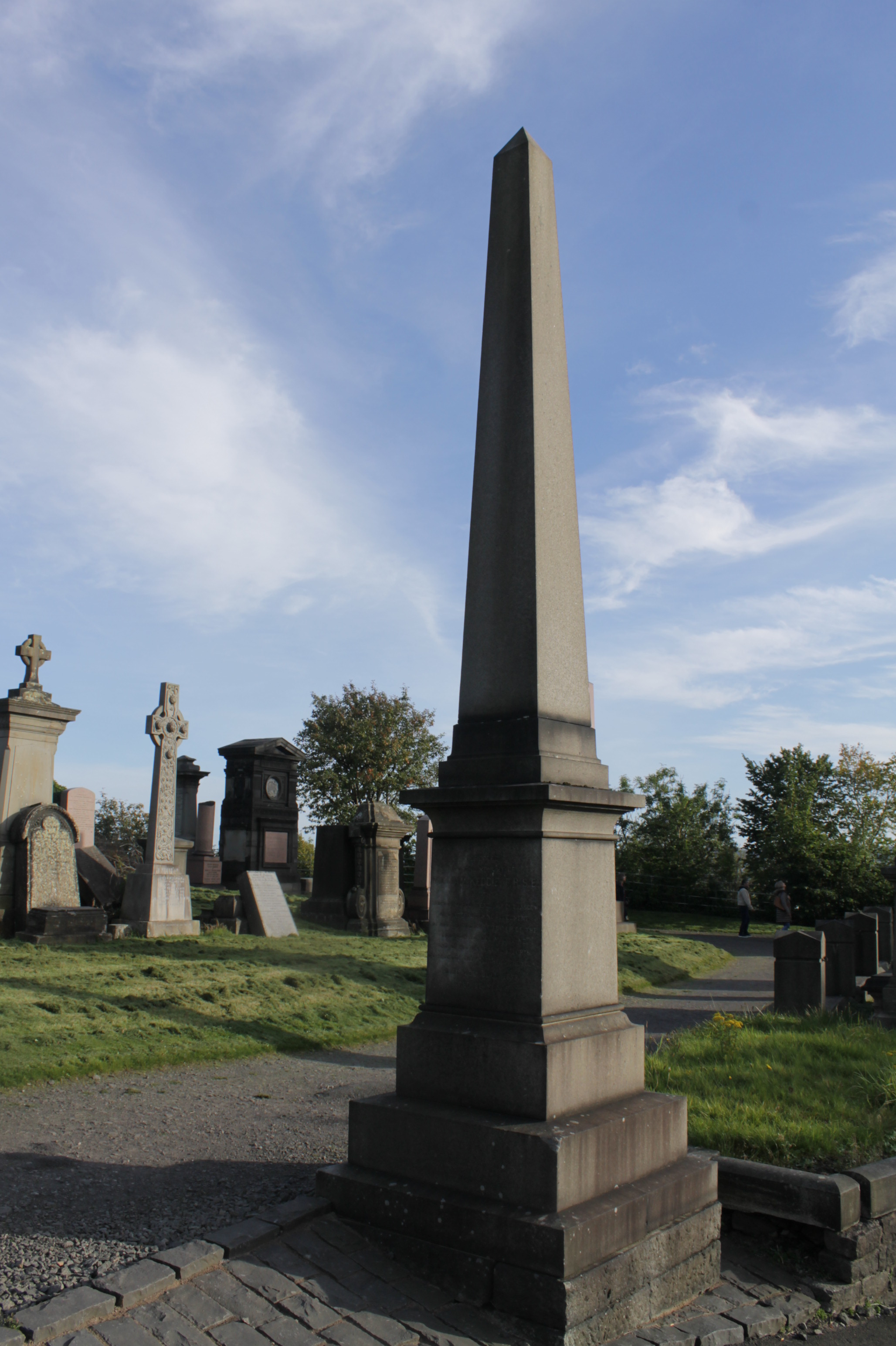
The grave of William Keddie, Glasgow Necropolis

He was born in Peebles on 22 March 1809

In 1822 he was apprenticed to a printer in Glasgow.

In the Disruption of 1843 he left the established Church of Scotland and joined the Free Church of Scotland. He became a lecturer in Natural Sciences at the Free Church College. He was also placed in charge of the Free Church's Sunday School system. From at least 1844 he published the Sabbath School Magazine.

In 1850 he was living at 15 North St Mungo Street.

In 1867 he was elected a Fellow of the Royal Society of Edinburgh. His proposer was John Hutton Balfour.

In 1874 he is noted as a member of the Geological Society of Glasgow and the Royal Philosophical Society of Glasgow.

He lived in later life at 5 India Street in Glasgow He died suddenly on 26 July 1877 whilst holding a prayer meeting in Oban. He is buried in the Glasgow Necropolis. The grave lies on the northern-western edge of the upper plateau. He was unmarried and had no children. The grave was erected by "Friends of the Sabbath School".

== Publications ==
- Moffat:Its Walks and Wells (1854 reprinted 1880) - a geological study
- Notes on Niagara (1874)
- The Sabbath School Magazine (quarterly magazine 1844-1877)
- Edinburgh and Glasgow to Stirling, Doune, Callendar etc A Geological Study
