= Hugh Tennent =

Scottish brewer

Hugh Tennent Tennent (29 August 1863 – 20 April 1890) was a Scottish brewer, the great-great-grandson of the founder (also Hugh Tennent) of the Wellpark Brewery now known as the Tennent's brewery. He began production of Tennent's lager in 1885, having acquired his brother's share of the business a year earlier.

== Early life ==
Tennent was born in Glasgow, the second son of Charles Stewart Parker Tennent and Arabella Jane Hay (after Charles Tennent's death, Arabella married Richard Frederick Fotheringham Campbell). His great-great-grandfather, also Hugh Tennent, founded the Tennent’s Wellpark Brewery, Glasgow in the 1760s. Hugh had one older brother, Archibald Hay Tennent, who was three years his senior. His father's brother was also Hugh Tennent (1780–1864).

Hugh’s father and grandfather both died in 1864 when he was only a year old. For the next twenty years the firm was successfully run by trustees. During this time the business was built to a value of more than £300,000. The brewery was greatly extended, the plant was modernized and the products promoted internationally.

== Career ==
In his late teens Tennent took on a senior management role until in 1884, aged 21, he became sole partner of the firm and proprietor of the works. His 21st birthday was celebrated by a banquet in Glasgow City Hall and upon taking control of his father’s business he gave gifts of money to all his employees, numbering at that time between five and six hundred.

Hugh Tennent took a close interest in the German industry and its rapid expansion into export markets. In 1881, while still in a senior management position, he travelled on the first of many visits to Bavaria. He was accompanied by Wyllie Clarke, who later became managing director. During the trip they familiarised themselves with lager brewing.

Inspired by the Bavarian lagers Hugh Tennent first brewed Tennent's lager in 1885. The transition to lager production was made easier as key parts of the brewing processes in Scotland and Bavaria were similar for example low-temperature fermentation. He later built a new lager brewery on the Wellpark site, which was begun in 1889 and completed in 1891. At the time the enterprise earned the contempt of a local newspaper who hailed it as a ‘madman’s dream’. The lager brewery was set up by engineers with the firm L.A. Riedinger of Augsburg, which had previously set up plants in locations as far apart as Tiflis, Yoklahoma, Cuba and Buenos Aires.

== Death ==
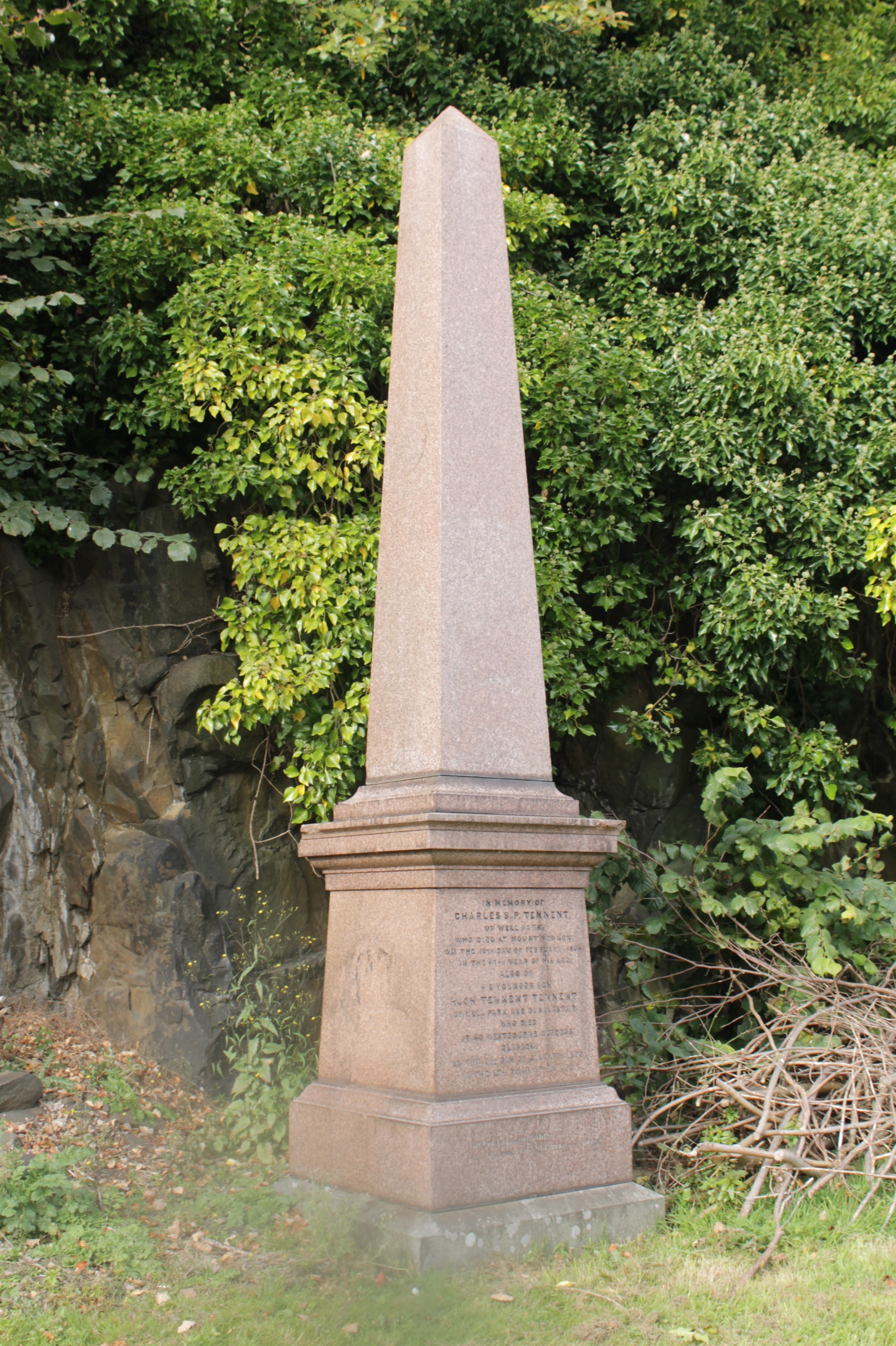
The Tennent grave, Glasgow Necropolis

Hugh Tennent died at 40 Westbourne Gardens in Glasgow, unmarried and childless, in 1890 at age twenty-six. His body is buried at the base of the rockface in the southmost section of the Glasgow Necropolis facing the Wellpark Brewery.

Above his share of the firm, his personal estate was worth at least a quarter of a million pounds. A second Tennent trust was set up to run the business, but Hugh Tennent was the last member of the family in direct control of Tennent’s.

== Sources ==
- Records of Tennent Caledonian Breweries Ltd.
- The Bailie magazine (29 October 1884)
- The National Guardian newspaper (6 November 1884)
- National registers of births, marriages and deaths.
- 'Tennent, Hugh in Alcohol and Temperance in Modern History: An International Encyclopedia'. Editors: Jack Blocker; David Fahey; Ian Tyrrell
- 'The Brewing industry: a guide to historical records' (Richmond, Turton 1990)
- Memoirs and portraits of one hundred Glasgow men: Hugh Tennent.
- 100 Years of lager brewing in Scotland By D.I.H. Johnstone.
