= David Prince Miller =

British magician and theatre owner (1809–1873)

David Prince Miller (1809–1873) was a Scottish showman and magician who founded several Adelphi Theatres in at least Glasgow, Coatbridge and Dumbarton.

Conceptual, he created the idea of reduced Shakespeare plays, creating plays which lasted twenty minutes, an idea later followed by the Reduced Shakespeare Company.

== Career ==
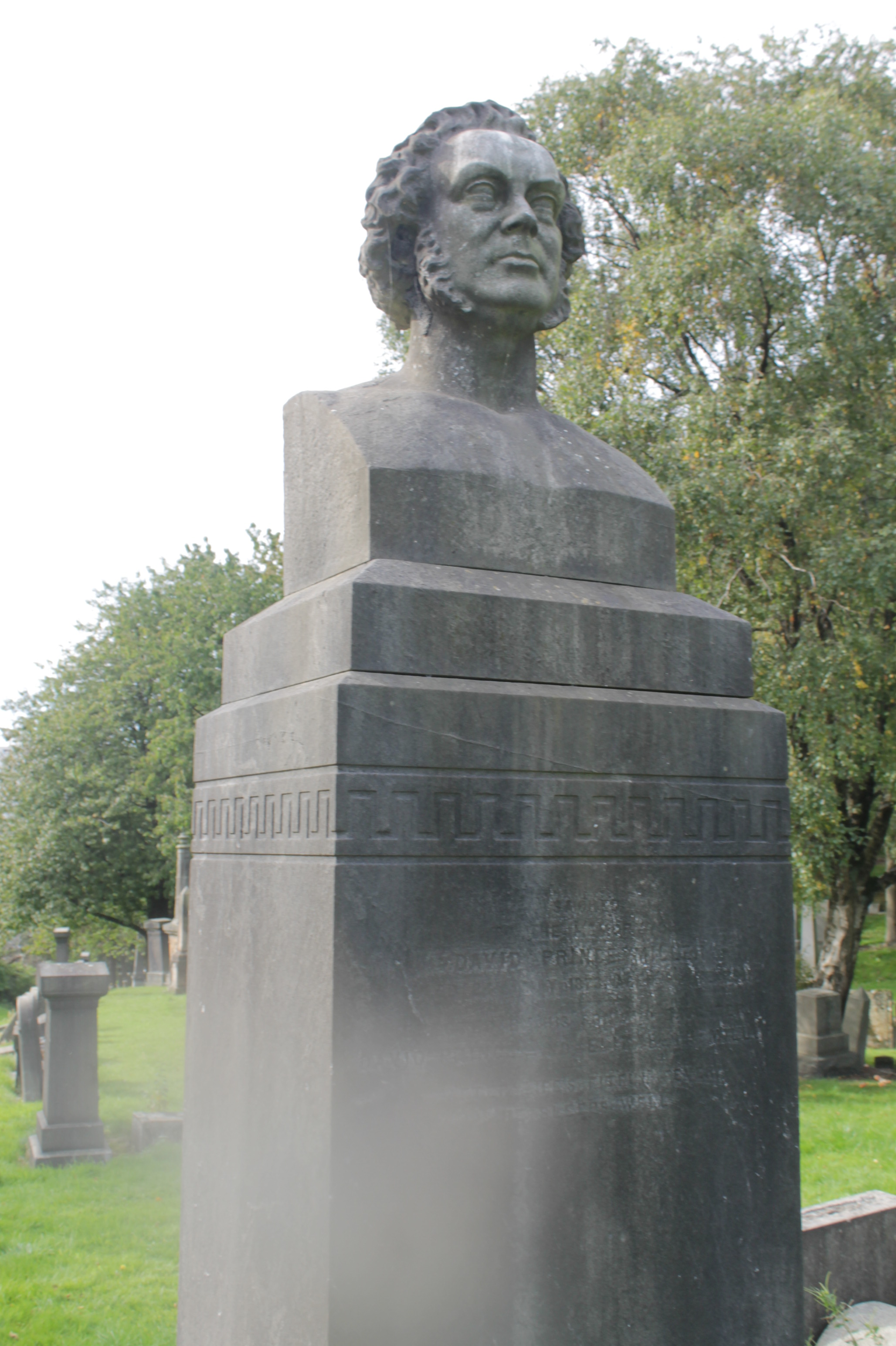
The grave of David Prince Miller, Glasgow Necropolis

From around 1825, he appeared as an illusionist in small theatres and halls in England and southern Scotland.

He came to Glasgow in July 1839 from Dalkeith, setting up a show on Glasgow Green during the Glasgow Fair. Other acts at the same fair included John Henry Anderson.

Although Miller only charged one penny for entrance, he netted £70 during the fair (the equivalent of £7,500 in 2020) and was able to reinvest this money in his travelling show which he took to Stirling, Cupar, Dundee, Perth, Kirkcaldy, St Andrews and Dunfermline. He over-wintered in Airdrie before starting the circle again in 1840.

In 1842 (using his profits from the travelling show), he built the Sans Pareil Theatre (holding 1,200 people) near the Saltmarket in central Glasgow and the Adelphi Theatre (holding 2,500 people) on the edge of Glasgow Green.

The Adelphi was one of only two large theatres at that time and was in rivalry with Anderson's Theatre Royal. Miller targeted the poorer residents of the city.

In 1845, he is listed as "Manager of the Adelphi Theatre", living at 4 Steel Street, close to Glasgow Green. The theatre was timber-built and huge, even by modern standards, holding 2,500 spectators. A false alarm in the theatre caused a panic in which an 18-year-old boy received fatal injuries.

In 1848, he sold the theatre to James Calvert of Dublin. It burnt down soon after.

Miller went on tour with a show called Through Fire and Water. In 1855, Miller was on tour with a play concerning his own life: The Ups and Downs of Life which was performed at the Royal Clarence Theatre in London.

In 1863, in partnership with a Walter Edwin, he built an Adelphi Theatre in Coatbridge, holding an audience of 1,500. Roughly at the same time, he also opened an Adelphi Theatre in Dumbarton.

In later life, he ran the Prince's Mall Theatre. He was then living at 48 London Street in the centre.

The Adelphi Theatre in Coatbridge was renamed the Princess Theatre in 1873 having been sold to new owners.

== Personal life ==
He was married with a namesake son, David Prince Miller, and daughter, Elizabeth Miller.

=== Death ===
He died on 24 May 1873. He is buried in the lower south section of Glasgow Necropolis.

== Other works ==
In 1853, he published a book of his struggles, entitled The Life of a Showman.
