= James George Wilson =

James George Wilson MD FRSE FFPSG FRCSE (1830–1881) was a 19th-century Scottish surgeon and obstetrician. He was the first superintendent and physician of the Glasgow Maternity Hospital.

== Life ==
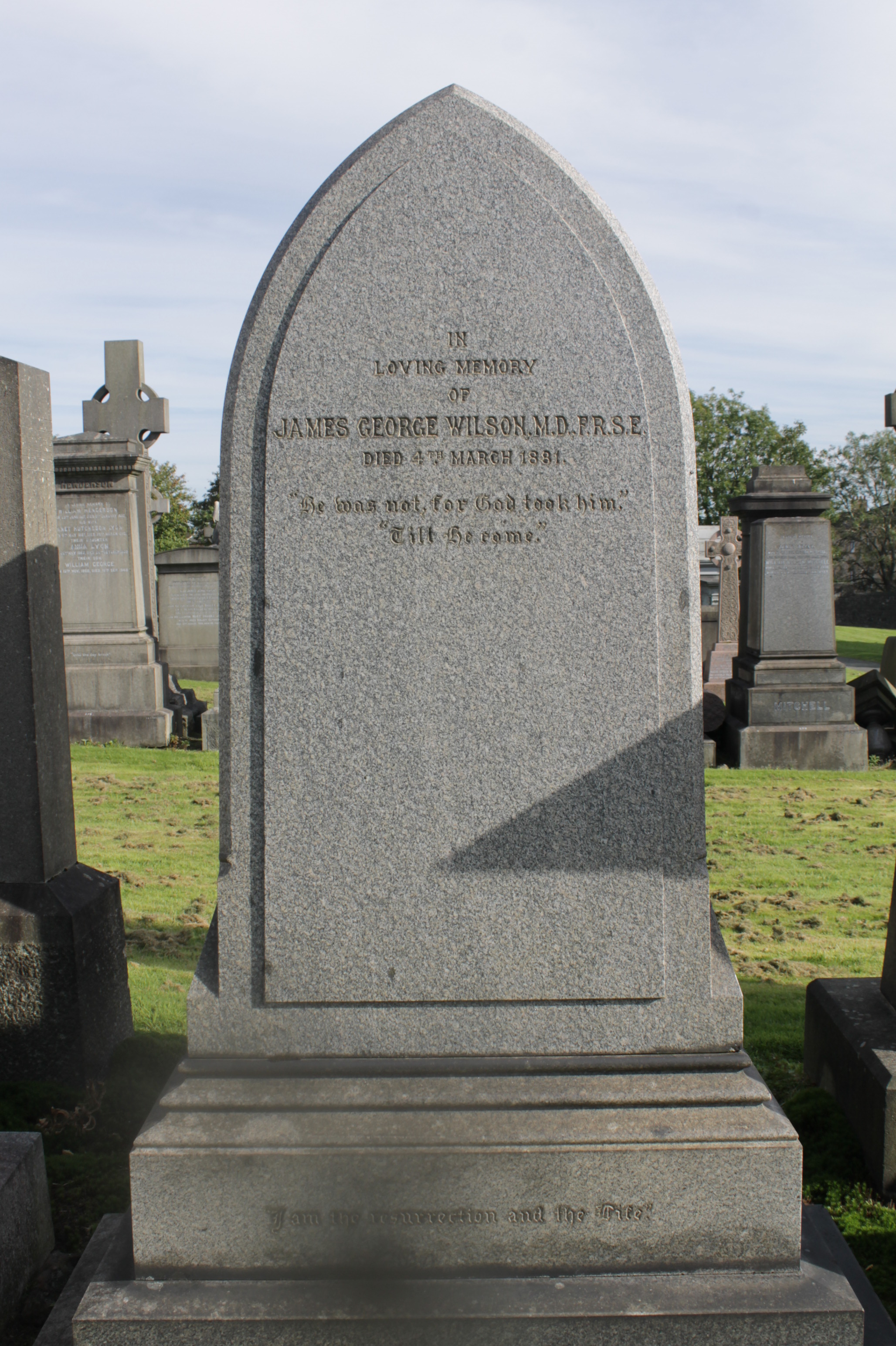
The grave of Prof James George Wilson, Glasgow Necropolis

He was born in Glasgow in 1830 the son of Dr James Wilson (1783–1857), a lecturer in Midwifery at the Portland Street School. In 1834 his father founded Glasgow's first specialist maternity hospital in the old Glasgow Grammar School on Greyfriars Wynd. In 1841 the hospital relocated to St Andrew Square.

James studied medicine at Glasgow University, gaining his doctorate (MD) in 1853. In 1855 he was living at 143 Hope Street.

When his father died in 1857 he took over his father's hospital. In 1860 he moved the hospital to Rottenrow. From 1863 he also served as professor of midwifery at the Anderson College in Glasgow.

In 1863 he was elected a Fellow of the Royal Society of Edinburgh. His proposer was Dr James Miller.

In 1866 his hospital was renamed the Glasgow Maternity Hospital. At this time he was living at Clarence Place on Sauchiehall Street.

He died at home 9 Woodside Crescent on 4 March 1881. Following his death the hospital relocated to a new building (still on Rottenrow and then generally called "The Rottenrow"). In 1914 it was renamed the Glasgow Royal Maternity and Women's Hospital. He is buried in the Glasgow Necropolis. The grave lies in one of the eastern lines on the upper plateau.
