= William Mossman =

Scottish sculptor

William Mossman (18 August 1793 – 23 June 1851) was a Scottish sculptor operational in the early 19th century, and father to three sculptor sons.

== Life ==
Said to be a descendant of James Mossman (1530–1573), Mossman was born in West Linton, the son of the local schoolmaster, John Mossman (died 1808) and Jean Forrest.

He apparently trained under Sir Francis Chantrey in London before returning to Scotland in 1823, where he first lived in Edinburgh, working as a marble cutter on Leith Walk before moving Glasgow in 1830, where he lived for the remainder of his life. In 1833 he began his own company "William Mossman", renamed to "J G & W Mossman" in 1854, when he embraced his sons into the firm as partners. From 1857 the firm was known as J & G Mossman Ltd.

During the boom of cemetery development in Glasgow, Mossman received many commissions for monuments in the Glasgow Necropolis, Sighthill Cemetery and the Southern Necropolis m.

Mossman died in 1851 and was himself buried in Sighthill Cemetery in north Glasgow, with his monument designed by Alexander "Greek" Thomson.

== Principal works ==
- Bust of James Cleland (1831)
- Bust of David Hamilton (c. 1835)
- Heraldic panels, Lennox Castle (1837–1841)
- Monument to Peter Lawrence, Glasgow Necropolis (1840)
- Monument to "Highland Mary", Greenock Cemetery (1841)
- Tomb of Mrs Lockhart, Glasgow Necropolis (1842)
- Corbel heads on west front of Glasgow Cathedral and recarving of gargoyles (1842) under the employ of Edward Blore
- Monument to Lt. Joseph F. Gomoszynski, Glasgow Necropolis (1845)
- "Beloved Mother" monument, Glasgow Necropolis (1845)
- Monument to Lord Cathcart, Paisley Abbey (1848)

== Family ==
Mossman married Jean McLahlan in London in 1816 and had three sons, each of whom became sculptors: John Mossman, George Mossman and William Mossman Jr.

=== John Mossman ===
See separate article

=== George Mossman ===
George Mossman (1823–1863) was born in Edinburgh soon after the family left London.

He studied at the Royal Academy in London plus in the studios of William Behnes and John Henry Foley.

He died of an epileptic seizure, aged only 40 and was buried with his parents at Sighthill Cemetery.

=== William Mossman II ===
William Mossman the younger (1824–1884) was born in Edinburgh.

He trained under his father, Carlo Marochetti, John Thomas, and William Behnes. He in turn trained William Shirreffs whilst tutoring at the Glasgow School of Art.

He was buried in Sighthill Cemetery with his father.
