= Tennent Caledonian =

Brewery in Glasgow, Scotland

Tennent Caledonian Breweries UK Ltd
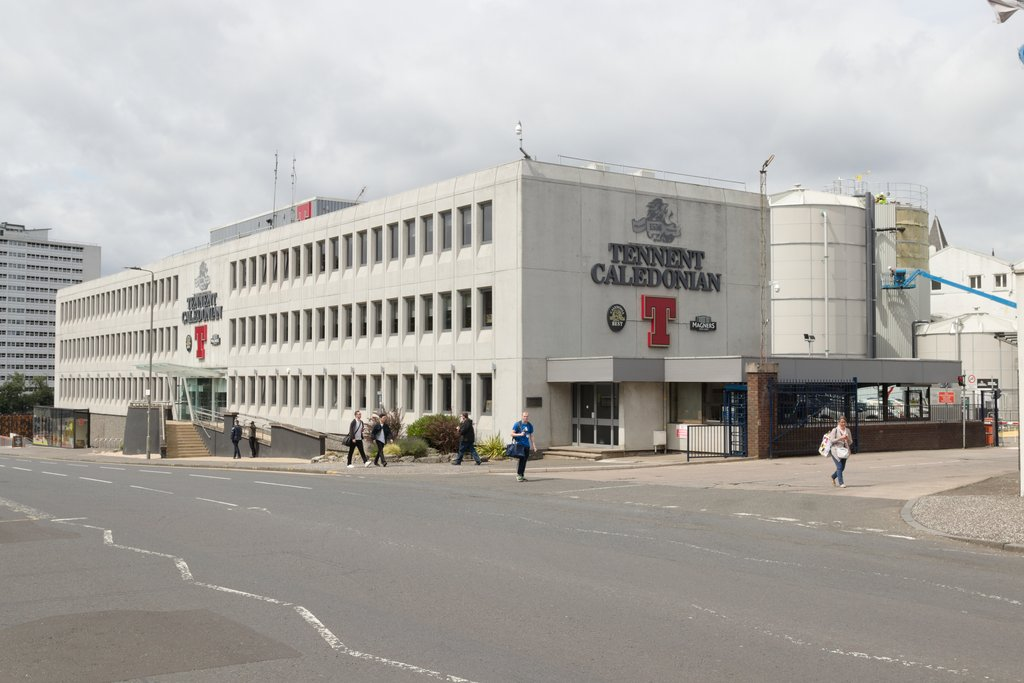
- Tennent Caledonian Brewery, Duke Street, Glasgow
- Industry: Brewing
- Predecessor: J. & R. Tennent
- Founded: 1740; 286 years ago
- Founder: Hugh and Robert Tennent
- Headquarters: Glasgow, Scotland, UK 55.8601°N 4.2307°W
- Products: Beer
- Parent: C&C Group
- Website: www.tennents.com

Tennent Caledonian is a brewing company based in Glasgow, Scotland. It was founded in 1740 on the bank of the Molendinar Burn by Hugh and Robert Tennent. It is owned by C&C Group plc, which purchased the Tennent Caledonian Breweries subsidiary in 2009, from Belgian brewing company Anheuser-Busch InBev (formerly known as InBev).

The company produces Tennent's Lager, Scotland's market-leading brand of pale lager, first brewed at the Wellpark Brewery in 1885.

== History ==
Wellpark Brewery was originally known as the Drygate Brewery. It was founded as H. & R. Tennent in 1740 at Drygate Bridge, near Glasgow Cathedral, by Hugh and Robert Tennent, although brewing had taken place at the same site on the banks of the Molendinar Burn by their ancestor, Robert Tennent, since 1556, making it the oldest continuous commercial concern in Glasgow.

Hugh Tennent's sons, John and Robert, continued the family business, trading as J. & R. Tennent from 1769. The business expanded in the 1790s when the Tennent family purchased the neighbouring brewery of William McLehose, and renamed the 5-acre (20,000 m^{2}) site Wellpark Brewery.

The firm originally brewed stout and strong export ales. By the mid-19th century, J. & R. Tennent was the world's largest bottled beer exporter. Robert Tennent died in 1826 and John Tennent in 1827. Hugh Tennent (the eldest son of Robert) then assumed control of the business. Hugh Tennent retired in 1855 with his fifth son, Charles Tennent, taking over, but he died in 1864, some months before his father. The brewery was subsequently operated by trustees on behalf of Charles Tennent's sons, Archibald and Hugh.

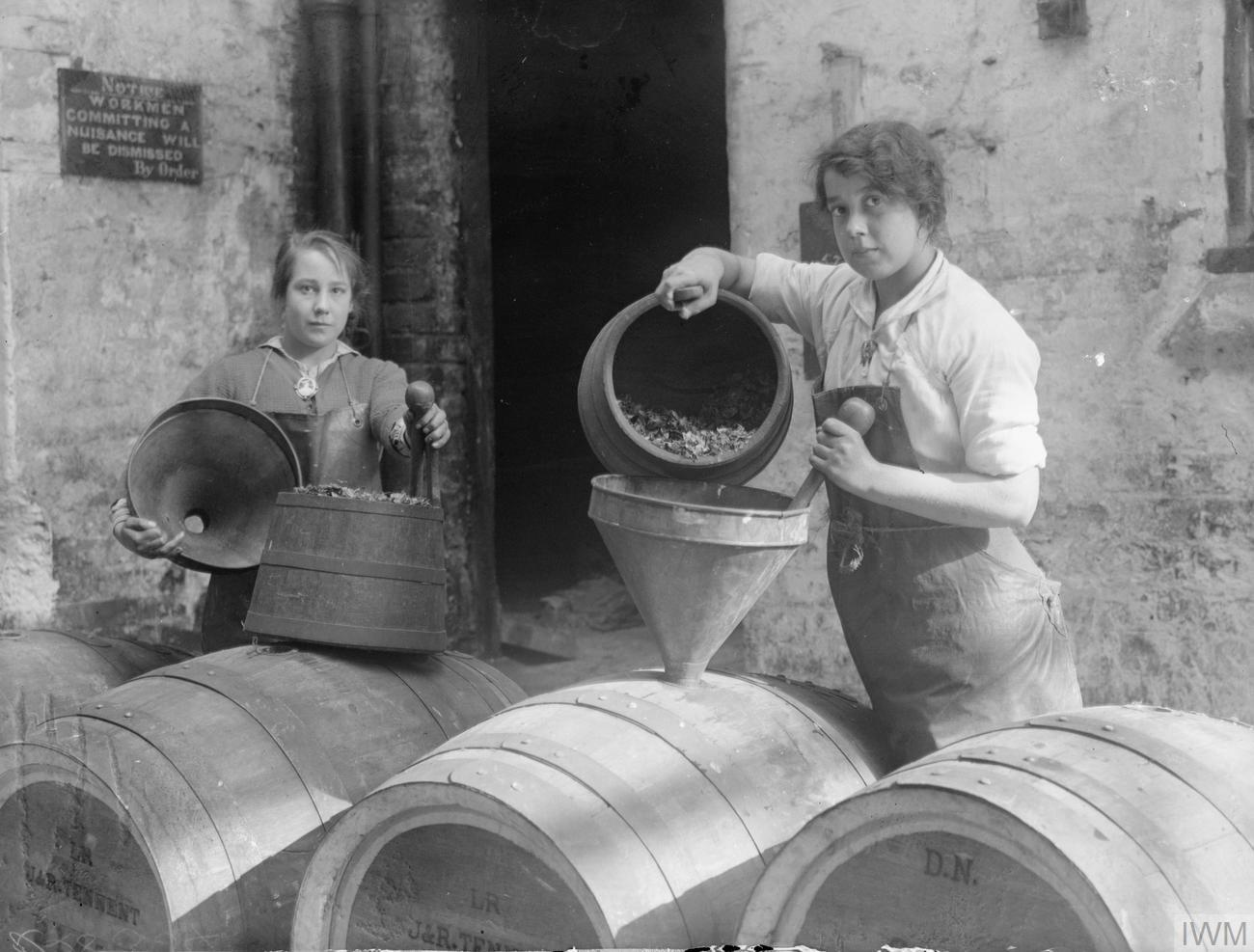
Brewers at J. & R. Tennent adding hops to beer in casks (1918)

In 1884, Hugh Tennent took control of the company and first brewed Tennent's lager in 1885. He later built a new lager brewery on the Wellpark site, which was begun in 1889 and completed in 1891. J. & R. Tennent produced the first draught lager in 1924, the first canned lager in 1935 and the first keg lager in 1963.

J. & R. Tennent was acquired by Charrington United Breweries in 1963, and in 1966 formally merged with United Caledonian Breweries, Charrington's other Scottish subsidiary, to form Tennent Caledonian Breweries. The new company's brewing was concentrated at the Wellpark Brewery and the Heriot Brewery in Edinburgh. Wellpark was redeveloped between 1965 and 1968, but Heriot was demolished in the 1990s. In 1967, Charringtons merged with Bass to form the Bass Charrington Group. It was later bought by the Belgian brewer Interbrew (now InBev) in June 2000, which became part of Anheuser-Busch InBev in 2008.

C&C Group of Ireland announced a deal to buy the brewery and the Tennent's brand from AB-InBev on 27 August 2009. It also agreed to acquire the Scottish and Irish distribution rights to Beck's and Stella Artois as part of the £180 million offer.

In May 2014, C&C Group and Williams Bros Brewing Co. opened a craft brewery joint venture on the site, called Drygate Brewing Co., named after Drygate – a street which adjoins the western perimeter of the brewery.

As of 2025, C&C Group produce Hawkstone's Session Lager and Premium Lager currently at the Tennent's brewery in Glasgow under the licence of Hawkstone Brewery to keep up with rising demand.

== Beers ==
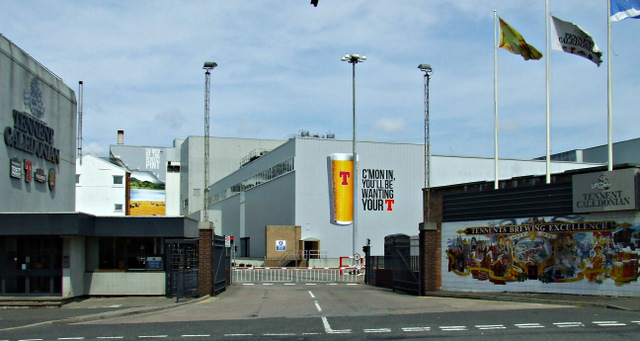
Wellpark Brewery in Glasgow

Tennent's Lager is Scotland's best-selling pale lager, with approximately 60% of the Scottish lager market. The lager was first brewed in 1885 by Hugh Tennent and in 1893 it won the highest award at the Chicago World's Fair. Tennent's Lager is certified by the Vegetarian Society as being suitable for vegetarians.

The lager was once famous for the design of its cans, which featured photos of various female models printed onto the side, known affectionately as "The Lager Lovelies". This feature was used by Tennent's up until the final campaign in 1989. Today, authentic original Lager Lovely cans are sought after among collectors. The can design is now a plain yellow colour, with the company's trademark large red "T" featuring prominently. A banner heads the can, reading: "Scotland's favourite beer, only ever brewed at Wellpark Brewery, Glasgow".

The brand's super strength lager, Tennent's Super (9% ABV), is no longer produced by Wellpark and is produced by Inbev, who kept the brand after the sale of Wellpark to C&C.

Caledonia Best was launched in November 2011, and uses 100% Scottish barley.

- Tennent's Lager (4% ABV)
- Tennent's Special (3.5% ABV)
- Tennent's Ember (4.2% ABV)
- Tennent's Light Ale (3.1% ABV)
- Sweetheart Stout (2.0% ABV)
- Tennent's Original Export (4.7% ABV)
- Caledonia Best (3.2% ABV)
- Lemon T (2.8% ABV)
- Black T (4.7% ABV)
- Tennent's Stout (4.0% ABV)
- Tennent's Whisky Oak (6.0% ABV)
- Tennent's 1885 Lager (5.0% ABV)
- Tennent's Scotch Ale (9.0% ABV)
- Tennent's Extra (9.3% ABV)

Contract-brewed for Innis & Gunn

- Innis & Gunn Lager Beer

== Sponsorship ==
The Tennent's brand is used for sponsoring music and sport; this included Scotland's largest outdoor music festival: T in the Park from 1994 to 2016. Tennent's previously sponsored T On The Fringe (part of the Edinburgh Festival), Triptych and Tennents ViTal in Northern Ireland.

In football, the brand has been used to sponsor Scottish Futsal and historically, the Scottish Cup for 18 years and the FA Charity Shield from 1989 to 1992, Tennents' Sixes and the Tennent's UK Snooker Championship even so the latter was held at the time in Preston in England. Tennent's also previously sponsored the Scotland national football team, replacing supermarket chain Morrisons. This deal was signed on 3 October 2006 and came into effect in time for the European Championship qualifying victory against France on 7 October 2006. This sponsorship came to an end on 24 May 2010.

Tennents sponsored Scottish football's "Old Firm" duo, Celtic and Rangers from 2010 until 2013 following their contracts with Carling expired at the end of previous season. Also, from 2010 to 2012 they sponsored EFL League One club Preston North End. It was previously the sponsor of the Irish Cup football competition in Northern Ireland.
