= David Mason (businessman) =

Scottish merchant

Sir David Mason OBE DL JP (11 May 1862 – 1 April 1940) was a Scottish merchant who served as Lord Provost of Glasgow from 1926 to 1929.

== Life ==
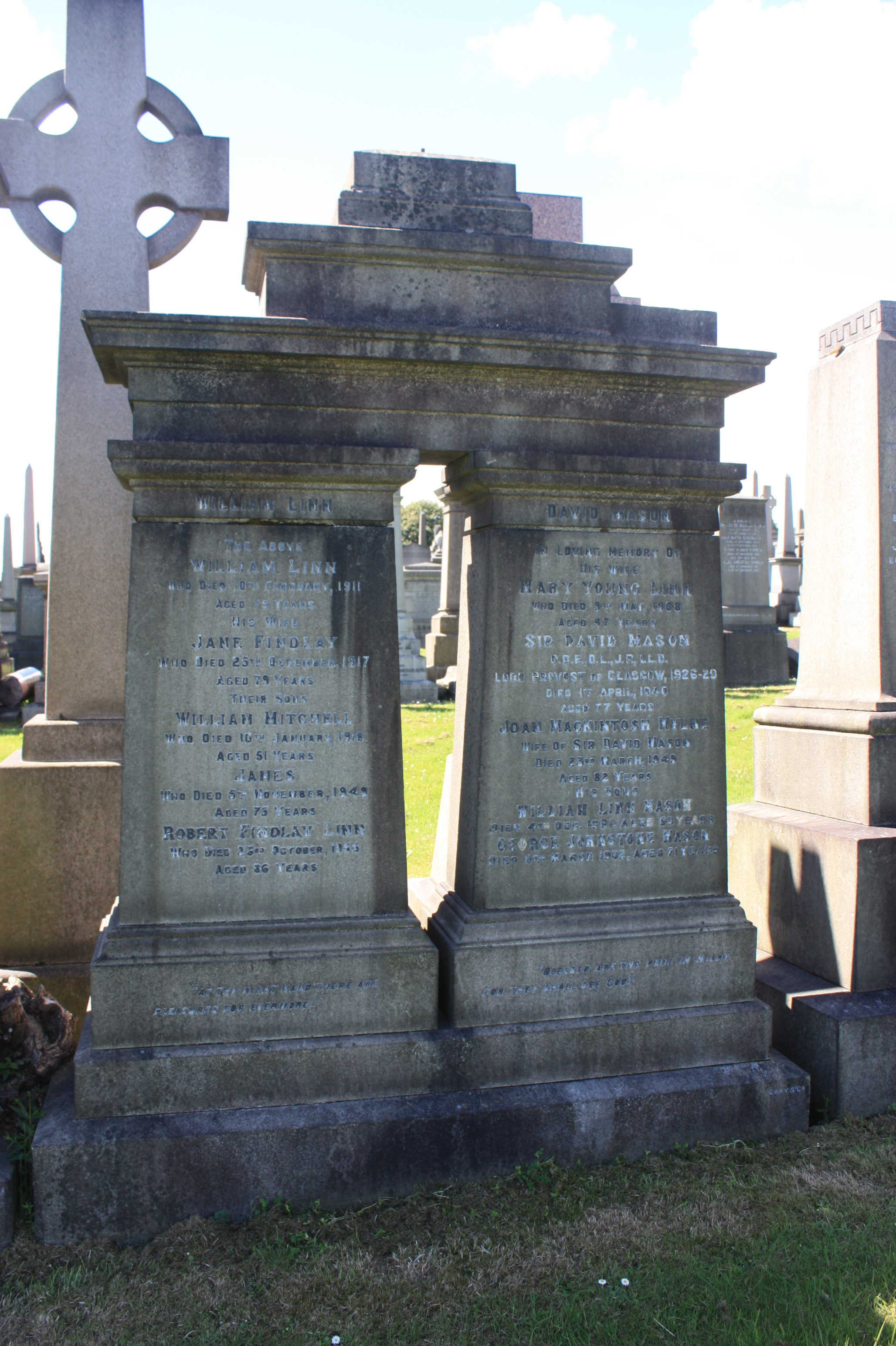
The grave of Sir David Mason, Glasgow Necropolis

Mason was born in Tradeston, Glasgow, the son of George Johnston Mason and Agnes Allison. He worked for his father's company, G. J. Mason & Co of 48 Queen Street in Glasgow, a company making mantles (cloaks) and skirts.

In 1926, he succeeded Matthew Walker Montgomery as Lord Provost of Glasgow. and was knighted in the 1928 New Year Honours.

He was Director of the Glasgow Humane Society.

He died on 1 April 1940. He is buried in the Glasgow Necropolis. The grave lies at the south end of one of the north-south rows on the upper plateau, towards the south-east.

== Family ==
He was married twice, firstly to Mary Young Linn (1861–1908). Their children included William Linn Mason and George Johnstone Mason.

He was then married to Joan Mackintosh Mylne (1866–1949).

== Artistic recognition ==
He was portrayed in office by William Llewellyn. The portrait is held by Glasgow Museum Resource Centre.
