= John Mossman =

English sculptor

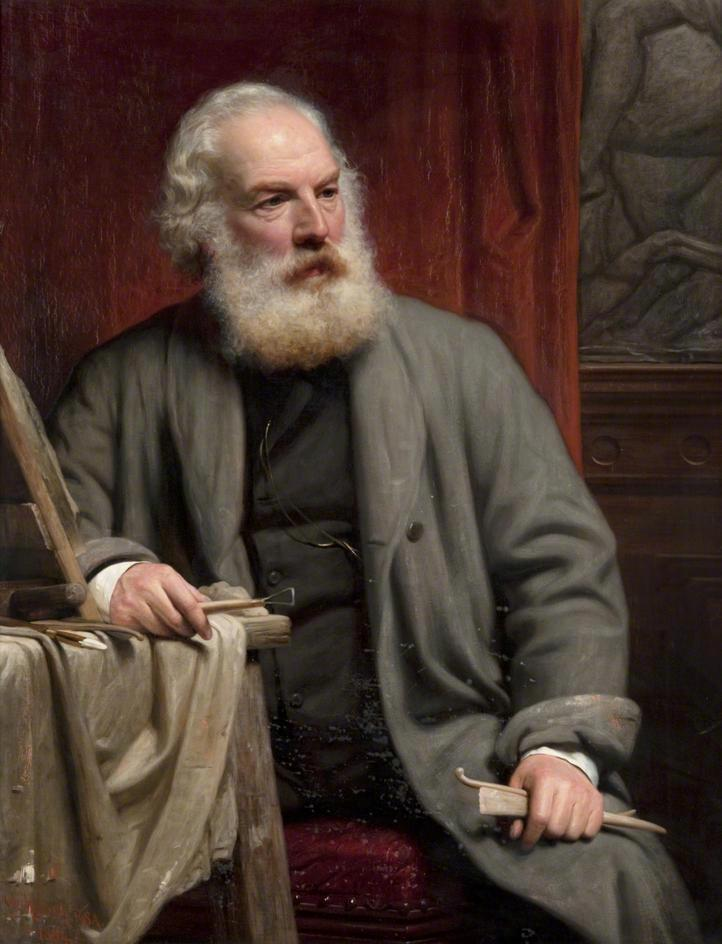
John Mossman (portrait by Norman Macbeth, 1884)

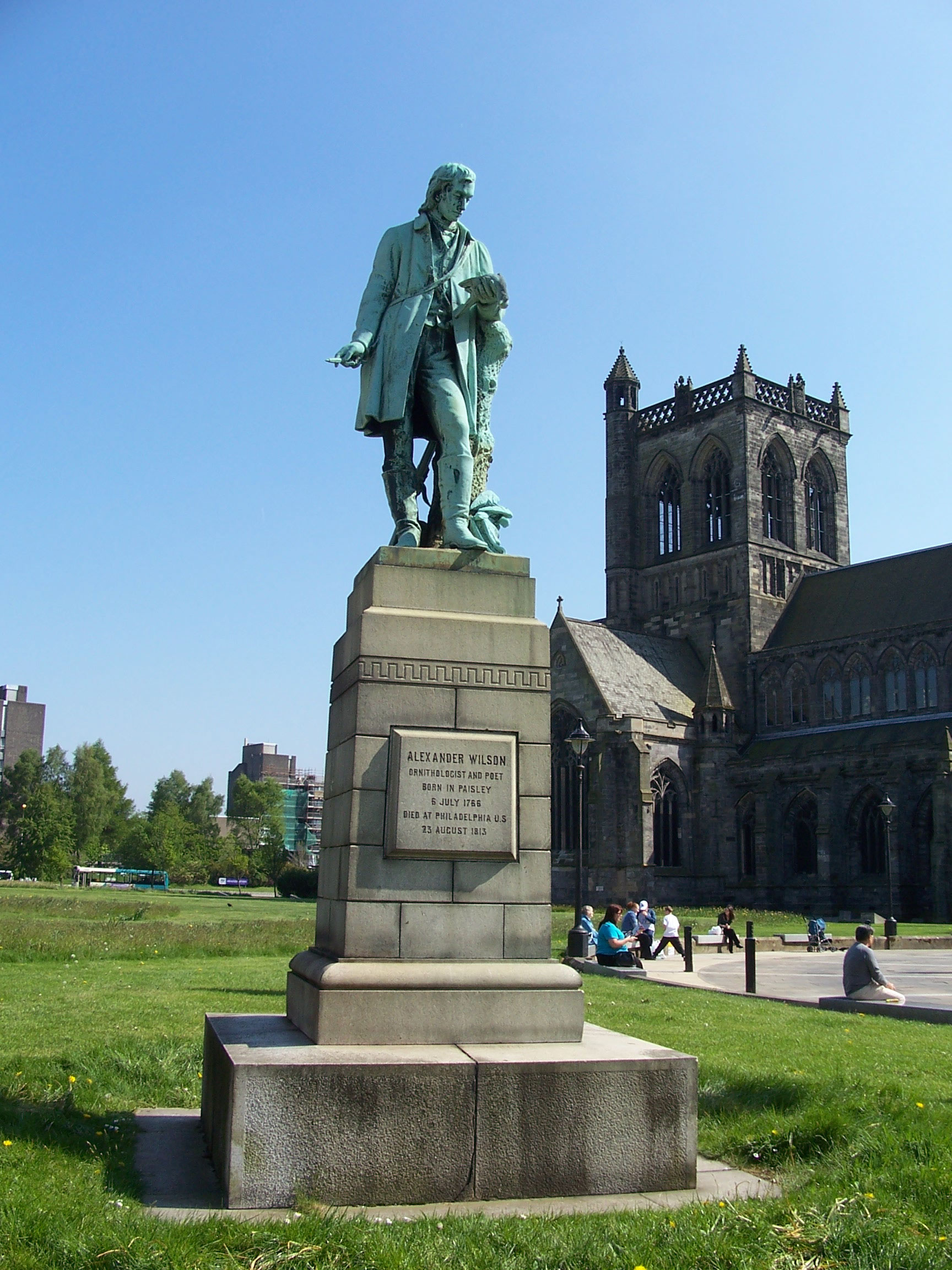
Wilson statue in Paisley

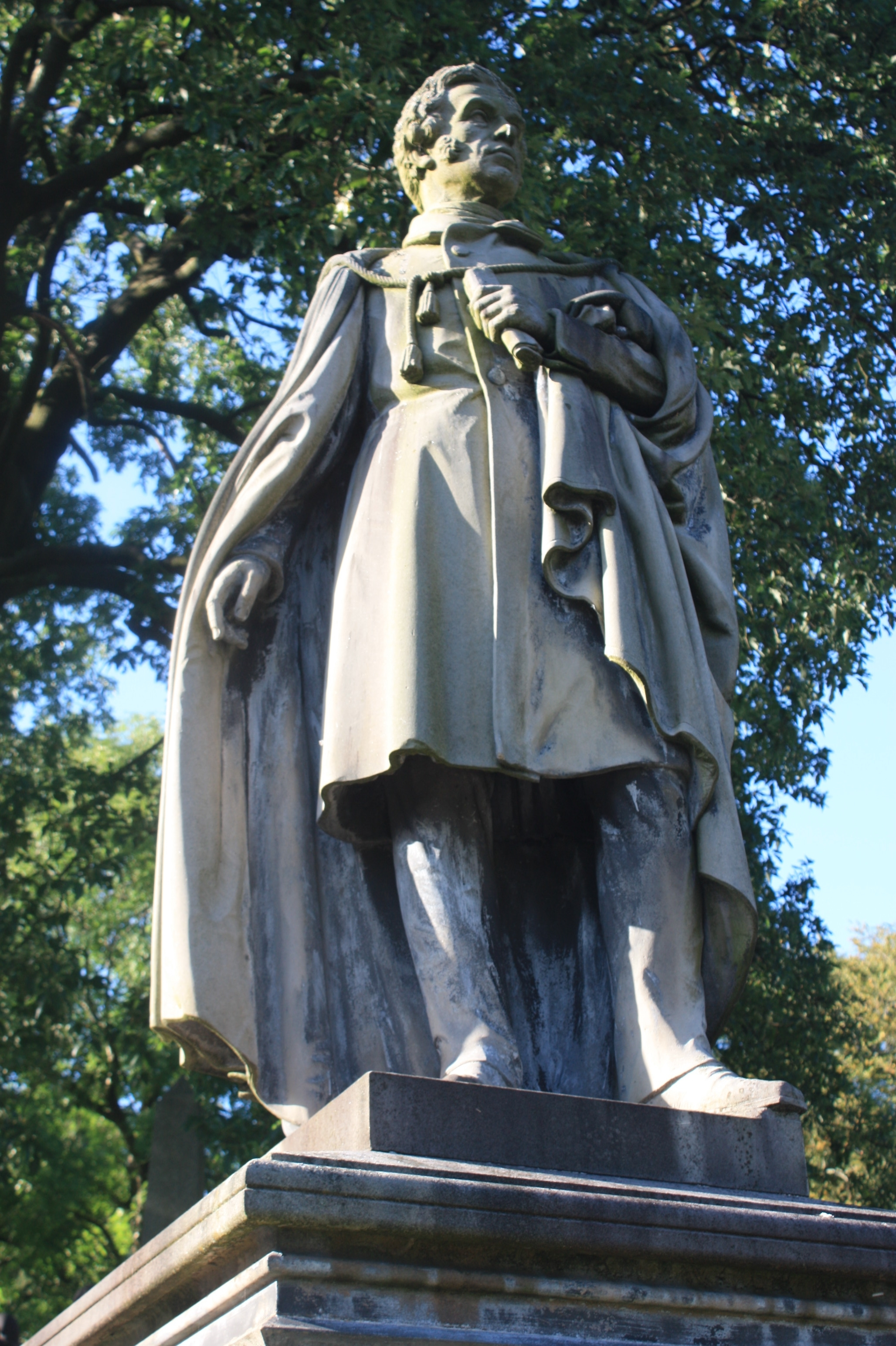
Monument to Rev Patrick Brewster, Woodside Cemetery, Paisley by John G. Mossman

John G. Mossman (1817 in London – 1890) was one of a number of English sculptors who dominated the production and teaching of sculpture in Glasgow for 50 years after his arrival with his father and brothers from his native London in 1828. His father William Mossman (1793–1851) was also a sculptor, and a pupil of Sir Francis Chantrey. He was trained both by his father and under Carlo Marochetti in London.

Together with his brother George Mossman they ran the successful firm of J & G Mossman which dominated Glasgow sculpture in the mid-19th century.

The family was originally Scottish, being related to James Mossman - a prominent jeweller and supporter of Mary, Queen of Scots who was executed after the Long Siege of Edinburgh Castle in 1573.

Mossman sculpted the now iconic William Shakespeare and Robert Burns statues adorning the facade of the Citizens Theatre, Glasgow along with the four muses. His work can also be seen in the statues that adorn the Atheneum off Royal Exchange Square. He apprenticed James Pittendrigh MacGillivray and they worked together for several projects.

John Mossman's is the distinctive hand in Glasgow's public statues of the latter half of the 19th century, and a number of works for the Glasgow Necropolis.

He exhibited in the Royal Academy from 1868–79.

He is buried with his parents in Sighthill Cemetery, Glasgow.

== Notable works ==
- Bust of James Lumsden (1840)
- Statue of Robert Peel Glasgow (1853)
- Completion of James Fillans' monument, "Grief", to James Fillans Snr, following his sudden death (1854)
- Monument to Henry Monteith in the Glasgow Necropolis (1854)
- Bust of William Connal (1856)
- Monument to Major William Middleton, Glasgow Cathedral (1860)
- Statue of Rev Patrick Brewster, Woodside Cemetery, Paisley (1863)
- Bust of Principal Cunninghame (1863)
- Bust of William Towers-Clark in the library of the Royal Faculty of Procurators in Glasgow (1875)
- Bust of the Duke of Hamilton for the Hamilton Monument at Cadzow (1863)
- Bust of Norman MacLeod (1868)
- Casting of "The Lady of the Lake" figure for the Loch Katrine fountain (1872)
- Fountain and relief of Hugh MacDonald (1872)
- Bust of Henry Glassford Bell in the Scottish National Portrait Gallery (1874)
- Statue of Alexander Wilson, weaver-poet, Abbey Close, Paisley
- Statue of David Livingstone Cathedral Square Glasgow (1875) assisted by James Pittendrigh MacGillivray.
- Statue of Thomas Campbell (poet) in George Square Glasgow (1877) assisted by James Pittendrigh Macgillivray
- Bust of Alexander Thomson (1877) ("Greek" Thomson)
- Bust of "Rosalind" in the Kelvingrove Art Gallery (1879)
- Bust of Sir Michael Shaw-Stewart, 7th Baronet (1880)
- Statue of Provost Lumsden (1881)
- Statue of Norman MacLeod (1881)
