= Scottish Futsal League =

Sports league in Scotland

The Scottish Futsal league is the only official futsal affiliated body in Scotland delivering adult futsal for the Scottish Football Association under the guidance of the Scottish Amateur FA. Futsal is an internationally recognised sport, governed by FIFA and UEFA.

== SFL History ==
Futsal in Scotland has been played in Perth since 1997. Formed by Mark Potter, the SFL was the first officially recognised Futsal League in Scotland (based in Perth) – by the Scottish Amateur FA, in 2001 with Chair Mark Potter.

Now the game is set to develop in Scotland and the SFA was the first of the four British associations to give official recognition to this five-a-side version of football. Futsal is an internationally recognised sport, governed by FIFA and UEFA.

Perth is now the oldest continuously running Futsal League in the United Kingdom which was created by Mark Potter and Stephen Chatila.

In 2005, the Scottish Futsal League joined up with the Futsal Premier League to help promote Futsal across the UK.

The Futsal Premier League (FPL) initiated a regional league in Edinburgh in November 2005. The Scottish National Futsal League, FPL Scotland, followed in 2006. FPL Scotland is sponsored by Tennent's, who have given away over 50,000 futsal balls and now also sponsor the National Football Team. Additional support came from the Scottish Football Association and kit manufacturer Joma. The FPL Scotland is divided into three Series, A, B and C, as opposed to two in England. Winners of the FPL Scotland Serie A progress to the UEFA Futsal Cup.

In 2006, eight teams played in the first FPL Scotland Series A: Aberdeen Cosmos, Dundee Dynamos, Edinburgh United, Fair City Santos (Perth), Glasgow City, Glasgow Maccabi, Inverness Wanderers, and Perth North Muirton.

Fair City Santos, Scotland's first UEFA Futsal Entrants played in the first preliminary round of the UEFA Futsal Cup, against Adana from Armenia, Futsal Mad Max from Finland, and Roubaix from France, although they failed to progress to the next stage.

Since 2006, the League Champions side has played in UEFA Futsal Cup.

In 2008, the Scottish Futsal League parted ways with the Futsal Premier League.

A new structure created in partnership with the SFA and SAFA in 2014 with new regional leagues formed (Aberdeen, Dundee, Edinburgh, Glasgow and Stirling in addition to the long running Perth league).

In 2014–15, there was the first finals weekend where each regional winner competed over three days in a mini league to declare the Scottish champions - Fair City Santos.

In 2015–16, the second finals weekend had a new champion for the first time outside of Perth - Wattcell of SFL Edinburgh.

2016 saw the Launch of a new national Scottish Cup won by Fair City Santos.

The 2016–17 launch of the first ever national league held over 12 weeks in one venue.

In 2017–18, the SFL 'Super League' launched as a standalone league comprising 10 clubs.

== Scottish Futsal Super League ==
The Scottish Futsal Super League has been running in its current format (with relegation and promotion to/from the regional leagues) since 2017.

=== 2019–20 season ===
Ten teams will compete in the 2019–20 Scottish Futsal Super League, with the winner qualifying for the 2020/21 Uefa Futsal Champions League. PYF Saltires are the current national champions. An up-to-date league table can be found on the Scottish Futsal League website.

=== 2018–19 season ===
Perth's PYF Saltires were crowned Super League champions for the 2018/19 season.

==== Final standings ====
Pos	Team	Pld	W	D	L	GF	GA	GD	Pts
1	PYF Saltires (C)	18	16	0	2	167	51	+116	48
2	Fair City Santos	18	14	1	3	136	79	+57	43
3	Wattcell Futsal Club	18	12	1	5	132	82	+50	37
4	Dundee Futsal Club	18	12	1	5	104	67	+37	37
5	TMT Futsal Club	18	9	2	7	112	80	+32	29
6	Polonia Edinburgh	18	8	1	9	121	135	−14	25
7	Polonia Dundee	18	6	0	12	95	150	−55	18
8	Glasgow City FS	18	5	1	12	87	119	−32	16
9	Five Cities Futsal Club (R)	18	3	0	15	83	173	−90	9
10	University of Edinburgh (R)	18	1	1	16	46	147	−101	4

(C) Champions qualify for the 2019/20 Uefa Futsal Champions League.; (R) Two teams are relegated from the Super League.

=== 2017–18 season ===
Edinburgh's Wattcell Futsal Club were crowned Super League champions for the 2017/18 season.

==== Final standings ====
Pos	Team	Pld	W	D	L	GF	GA	GD	Pts
1	Wattcell (C)	18	17	0	1	172	91	+81	51
2	TMT	18	14	1	3	108	72	+36	43
3	Fair City Santos	18	12	0	6	115	85	+30	36
4	PYF Saltires	18	11	1	6	126	75	+51	34
5	Dundee	18	10	0	8	125	89	+36	30
6	Polonia Edinburgh	18	9	1	8	115	101	+14	28
7	Polonia Dundee	18	6	1	11	119	131	−12	19
8	Five Cities	18	5	0	13	104	141	−37	15
9	AKN Lions (R)	18	2	0	16	57	153	−96	6
10	Glasgow Deaf (R)	18	2	0	16	76	179	−103	6

(C) Champions qualify for the 2018/19 Uefa Futsal Champions League.; (R) Two teams are relegated from the Super League.

== Scottish Futsal Cup ==
Each year futsal teams from across Scotland compete in a knockout competition to win the Scottish Futsal Cup.

List of Scottish Futsal Cup Winners
Season	Winner	Runner-up	Final Score
2018/19	PYF Saltires	TMT	4-2
2017/18	PYF Saltires	TMT	8-3
2016/17	Wattcell	TMT	7-2
2015/16	Fair City Santos	Wattcell	7-2

== Scotland National Futsal Amateur Select Team ==
Scotland National Select Team (S.A.F.A)

17-19 June 11 the national squad had their first match since 2003, the games took place in Amsderdam, Holland against a Dutch league select

and FC Goldenstars - Hollands current first division Champions

Manager - Mark Potter, Asst Manager - Gavin Price

Keepers - Craig Houston(Perth Saltires), Craig Rathney(SDIF), Outfield - Richard Doig, Sean Fergus, Scott Ballingull(all Perth Saltires), Mark Duigan, Gavin Price, Callum MacKinlay(all Breadalbane FC), Rob Haworth(Liverpool FC), Scott Lafferty, Mark Caldow(both Cherrybank FC)

Team	Pld	W	D	L	GF	GA	GD	Pts
Scotland	16	8	1	7	68	54	+14	25

Results

Amsterdam Holland - Matches 2 x 20mins realtime

18-06-2011 - FC Goldenstars 4 Scotland 5

18-06-2011 - Dutch Select 4 Scotland 5

Loughnane Sportswear Cup - (Mountmellick, Ireland) Matches 2 x 10mins

22-02-2003 - FC Camalot 4 Scotland 1 (Semi Final)

22-02-2003 - Midlands Futsal League 1 Scotland 8 (group match)

22-03-2003 - Scotland 4 Northern Ireland 1 (group match)

200-03-2003 - Tranmere Victoria 2 Scotland 0 (group match)

British Isles Nations Cup (Chester, England) Matches 2 x 15mins

20-02-2002 - Ireland 2 Scotland 1

20-02-2002 - Gilbraltar 5 Scotland 2

20-02-2002 - Tranmere Victoria (england) 6 Scotland 3

20-02-2002 - Scotland 6 Northern Ireland 5

Mastia - (Dublin, Ireland ) Matches 2 x 15mins

09-02-2002 - Tranmere Victoria 2 Scotland 1 (Semi Final)

09-02-2002 - Scotland 14 Northern Ireland 2 (group match)

09-02-2002 - Dublin Select 2 Scotland 4 (group match)

Friendly Matches

23-06-2001 - Ireland 6 Scotland 5

22-06-2001 - Ireland 5 Scotland 5

21-06-2001 - Ireland 4 Scotland 5
