= MV The Second Snark =

Passenger ferry built in 1938 in Scotland

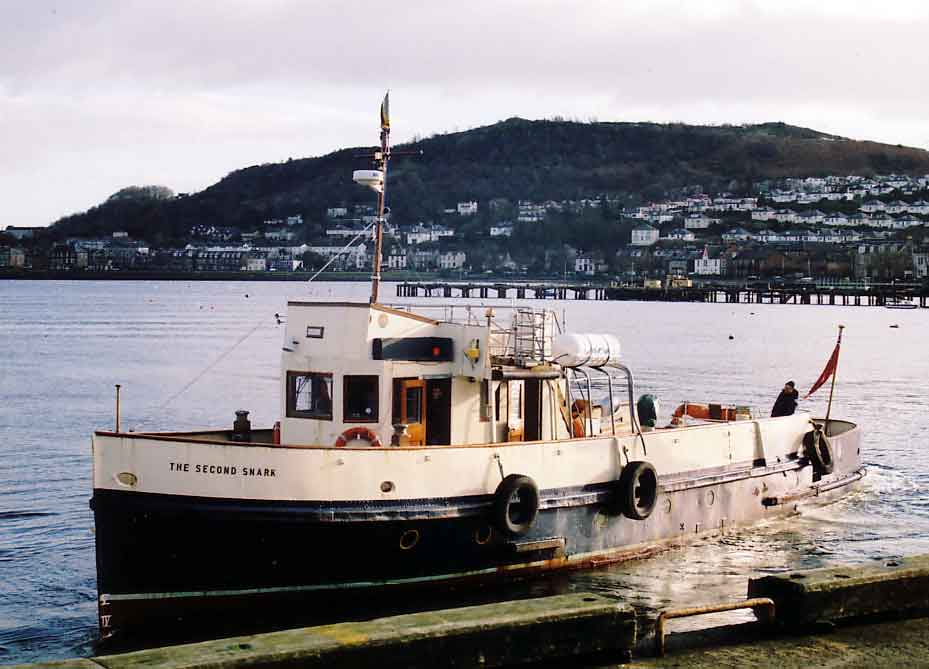
- The Second Snark on the ferry service from Gourock pierhead.

History

United Kingdom
- Name: MV The Second Snark
- Namesake: Earlier vessel and fictional creature The Snark
- Operator: 1938–1969: William Denny; since 1969: Clyde Marine Services
- Port of registry: Greenock
- Route: Govan to Yorkhill
- Builder: William Denny, Dumbarton
- Completed: 1938
- Status: In service

General characteristics
- Tonnage: 45 GT
- Length: 22.86 metres (75.0 ft)
- Installed power: 1972: Gardner diesel 66kw
- Capacity: 48 passengers (1938: 120)

MV The Second Snark is a small passenger ferry, built in 1938 by William Denny of Dumbarton, later operated by Clyde Marine Services on the Firth of Clyde, Scotland.

== History ==
MV The Second Snark was built in 1938 by William Denny for use in their Dumbarton shipyard as a tug and tender, replacing their previous steam driven vessel The Snark. The company went into liquidation in 1963, and the ship was taken over by Brown Brothers. They sold The Second Snark to Clyde Marine Motoring in 1969.

She is listed as a National Historic Ship. Having been laid up for over two years at Fairlie Harbour, she was restored to her 'as-built' 1938 condition and her passenger certificate renewed in 2011.

== Layout ==
The Second Snark is a small vessel, with a passenger capacity of 48. She retains many original features including teak decks, varnished woodwork and polished brass. There is one heated room with seating and a single toilet facility below deck.

== Service ==
William Denny used The Second Snark in their Dumbarton shipyard as a tug and tender. From 1960 to 1963 she also provided summer cruises on the Firth of Forth, returning to the Clyde in winter. Initially, Brown Brothers continued Forth cruises, while concentrating on research work for ship stabilisers. When the research project was completed in 1969, they sold The Second Snark to Clyde Marine Motoring.

From 1969, The Second Snark was based at Victoria Harbour or Princes Pier, Greenock, providing cruises on the Firth of Clyde under the Clyde Marine Cruises section of Clyde Marine Services Ltd. She provided cruises from Greenock and Helensburgh to Blairmore (for Benmore Botanic Garden) and into Loch Long. She has provided trips to Lochranza (Arran) via Rothesay and the Kyles of Bute and to Largs and Millport. She occasionally served on the Gourock – Kilcreggan – Helensburgh ferry service, substituting for the 1936 MV Kenilworth (then MV Seabus).

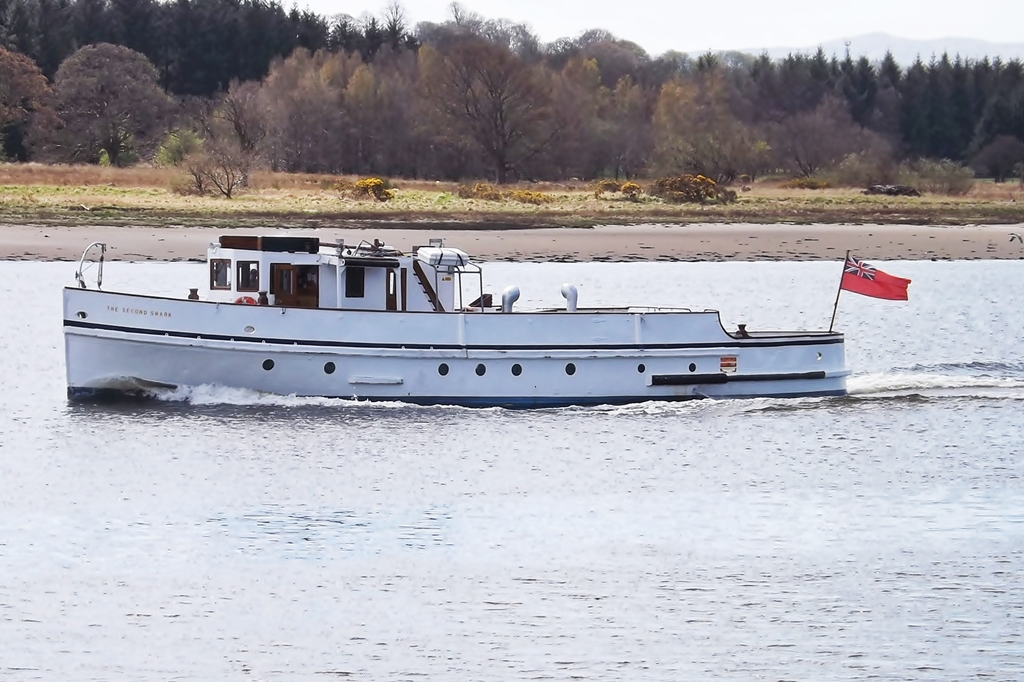
The Second Snark passing Bowling, West Dunbartonshire, in 2013.

From August 2011, Clyde Marine Services operated The Second Snark as a ferry between Govan and Yorkhill Quay where Glasgow's new Riverside Museum (the new transport museum) and the Tall Ship (Glenlee) are located. On Monday 11 July 2011, she made an appearance in James Watt Dock in Greenock as part of the Greenock Tall Ships Race event. In 2012, she performed a charter to Loch Riddon with PS Waverley. She tendered to the paddle steamer, ferrying passengers ashore at Ormidale in a recreation of the same sailing 40 years earlier.

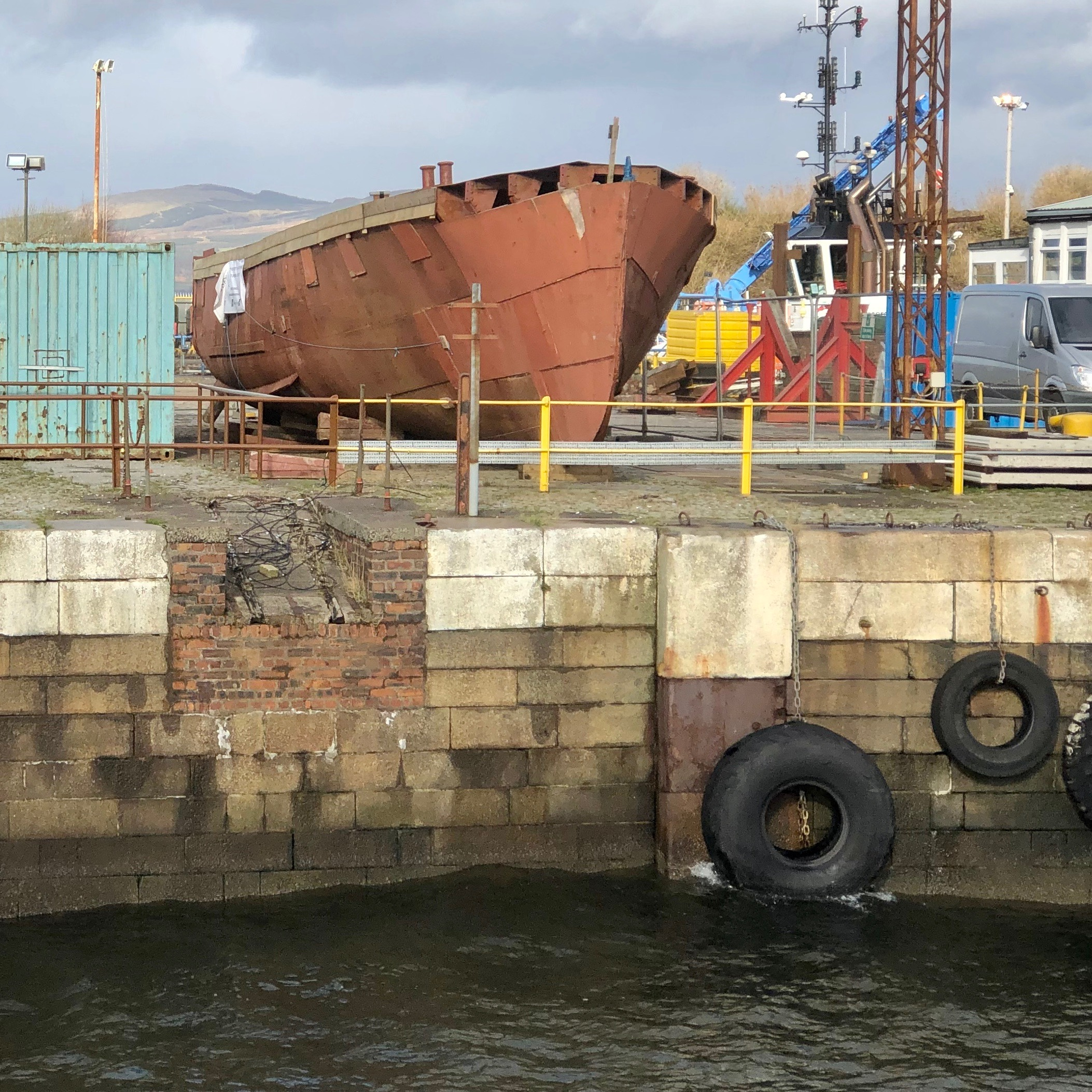
The Second Snark awaiting restoration at the James Watt Dock in Greenock

In summer 2018 it was reported that the venerable vessel had been sold by Clyde Marine Services to a billionaire businessman who intended to utilise her as a tender to his racing yachts in France as well as the United States and she was moved to Plymouth for a refit. However, late in 2019 she was acquired by a preservation group with substantial funding from former owner Hamish Munro and returned to Fairlie on the Firth of Clyde. In 2020 the vessel was moved to the James Watt Dock in Greenock and the premises of Dales Marine who will carry out restoration work in phases once funds have been raised and design work completed.

== Gallery ==
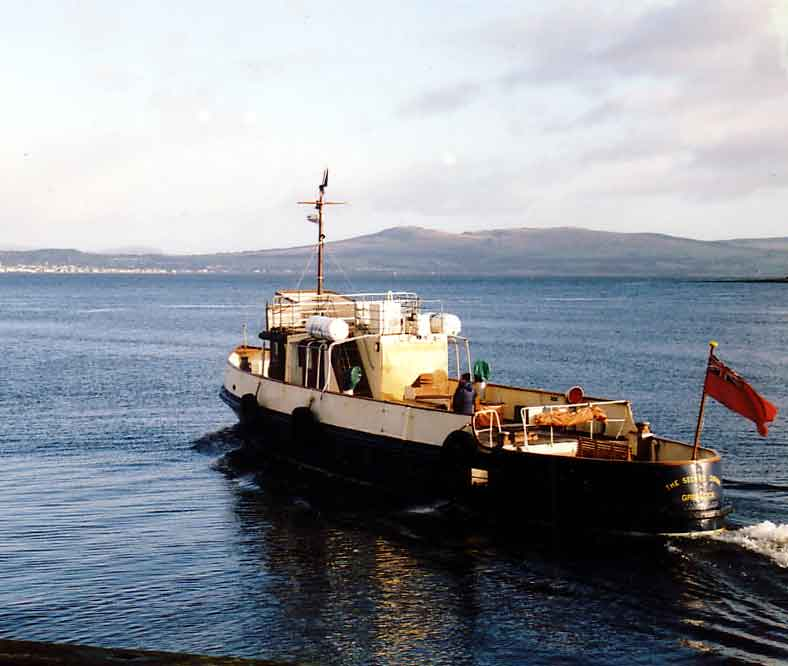
The Second Snark heads off to Kilcreggan

== See also ==
- List of ships built by William Denny and Brothers
