= William Mills (Lord Provost) =

Scottish merchant and shipping owner

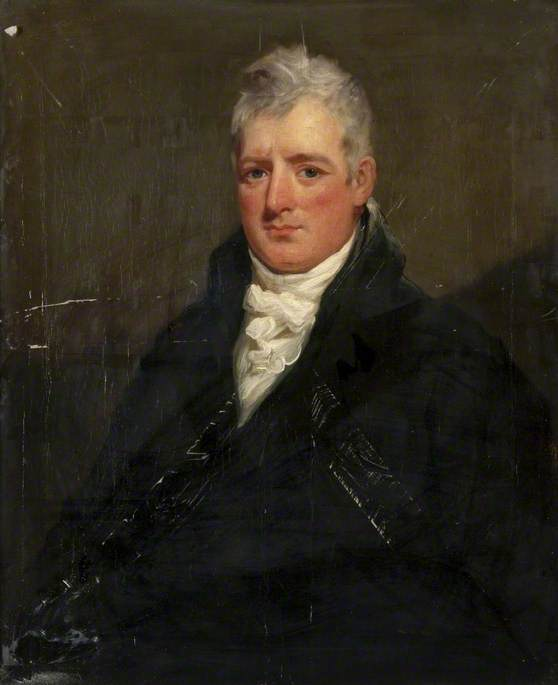
William Mills (1776–1857), Lord Provost of Glasgow (1834–1837), painting by anonymous artist (style of Henry Raeburn)

William Mills of Sandyford (1776–1857) was a 19th-century Scottish merchant and shipping owner who served as a Whig Lord Provost of Glasgow from 1834 to 1837.

== Life ==
He was born at Lessudden House near St. Boswells in Roxburghshire in 1776.

In the 1790s he appears to have travelled to the United States and established various cotton plantations there.

In earlier life he appears as a merchant at 127 Trongate House in the Clyde Buildings.

From 1819 he also began investing in steamships, at first travelling between Greenock on the River Clyde and River Mersey. His first ship was the SS Robert Bruce. He increased his fleet with the SS Superb, the SS Majestic and the SS City of Glasgow.

In 1826, in co-operation with others, built the larger SS United Kingdom, which traded between Edinburgh and London.

Later, still as a merchant, he had premises with his younger brother Thomas Mills at 107 Buchanan Street. Whilst Lord Provost he lived at Sandyford Place off Sauchiehall Street.

As a politician he first served as a Bailie representing the Gorbals then became a Bailie of Glasgow and Chief Magistrate. He was elected Lord Provost in 1834. In 1837 he was succeeded as Lord Provost by Henry Dunlop of Craigton in 1837.

He died at 7 Woodside Terrace in the Sandyford district of Glasgow on 8 December 1857. He is buried in the family vault in the Glasgow Necropolis.

== Family ==
He was father to the Glasgow shipbuilder George Mills (1808-1881).

== Artistic recognition ==
He was portrayed in office in the style of Henry Raeburn.
