= MV Hotspur IV =

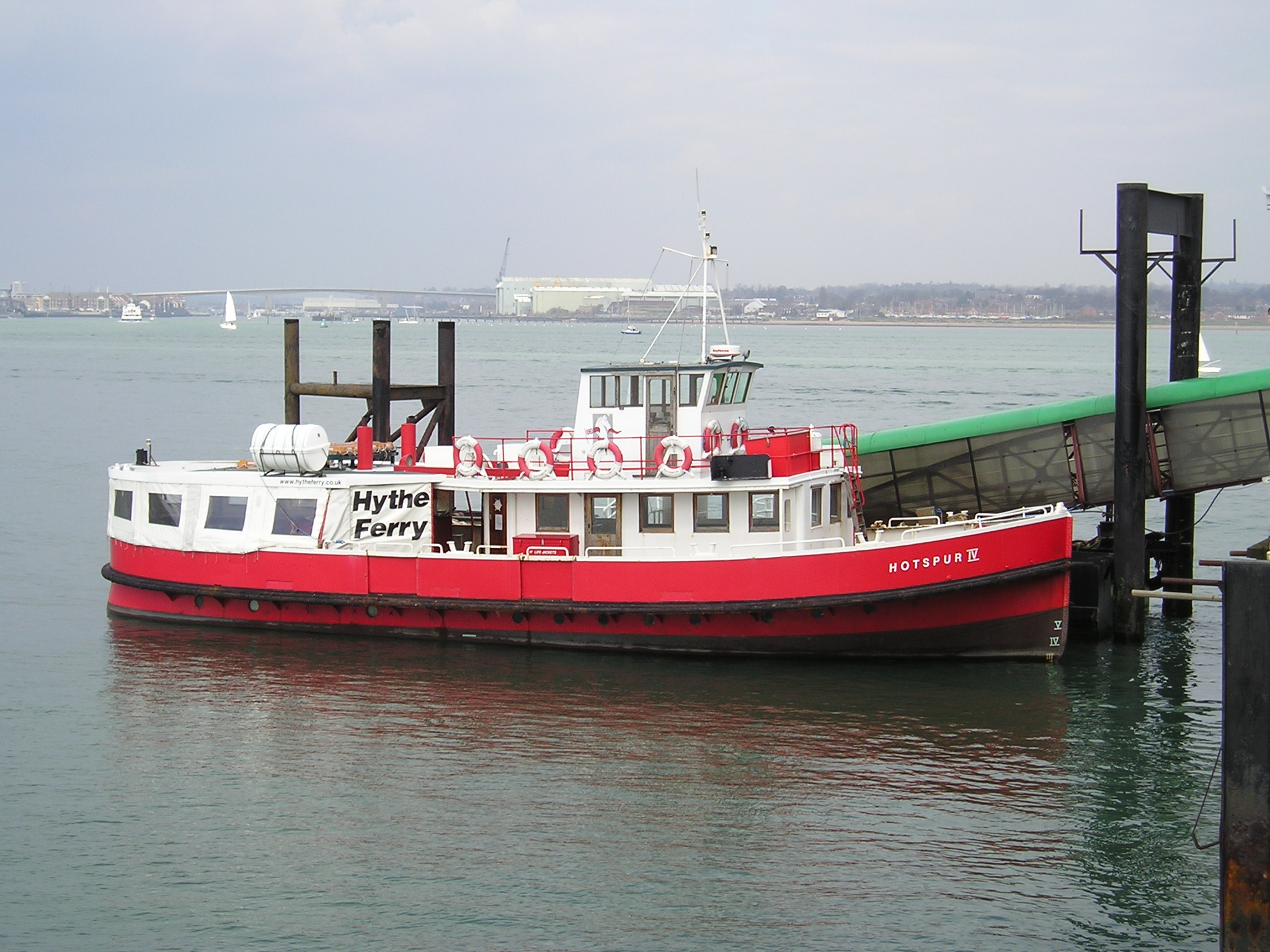
- Hotspur IV at Hythe pier head

History

United Kingdom
- Name: MV Hotspur IV
- Operator: Hythe Ferry
- Port of registry: Southampton
- Route: Hythe Ferry
- Builder: Rowhedge Ironworks, Colchester
- Completed: 1946
- Out of service: 2014

General characteristics
- Length: 60 ft (18 m)
- Installed power: R6 Kelvin
- Speed: 9 knots
- Capacity: 300 passengers

The MV Hotspur IV is a historic passenger ferry, which previously operated on the Hythe Ferry service. This service connects the town of Hythe and the city of Southampton, across Southampton Water in England.

The Hotspur IV was built by Rowhedge Ironworks in 1946. She was the last, and slightly larger, of three half-sisters built for use on the Hythe Ferry, alongside the Hotspur II and Hotspur III. The use of the name Hotspur for several generations of Hythe ferries derives from the involvement, and later ownership, of the ferry service by the Percy family, whose member Hotspur was immortalised by William Shakespeare.

Hotspur II was sold in 1978 and continued in service on the Firth of Clyde under the name Kenilworth until 2007. The Hotspur III was broken up in 1981.

In 2012, the Hotspur IV received a new livery of green, following a re-branding of the Hythe Ferry.

In 2014 however, her life on the Hythe Ferry run came to an end, as the Hotspur IV was forced out of service, after the Maritime and Coastguard Agency (MCA) ruled that it was unsafe for passenger use due to a corroding hull. Her future currently remains unclear.
