= MV Ben Bates =

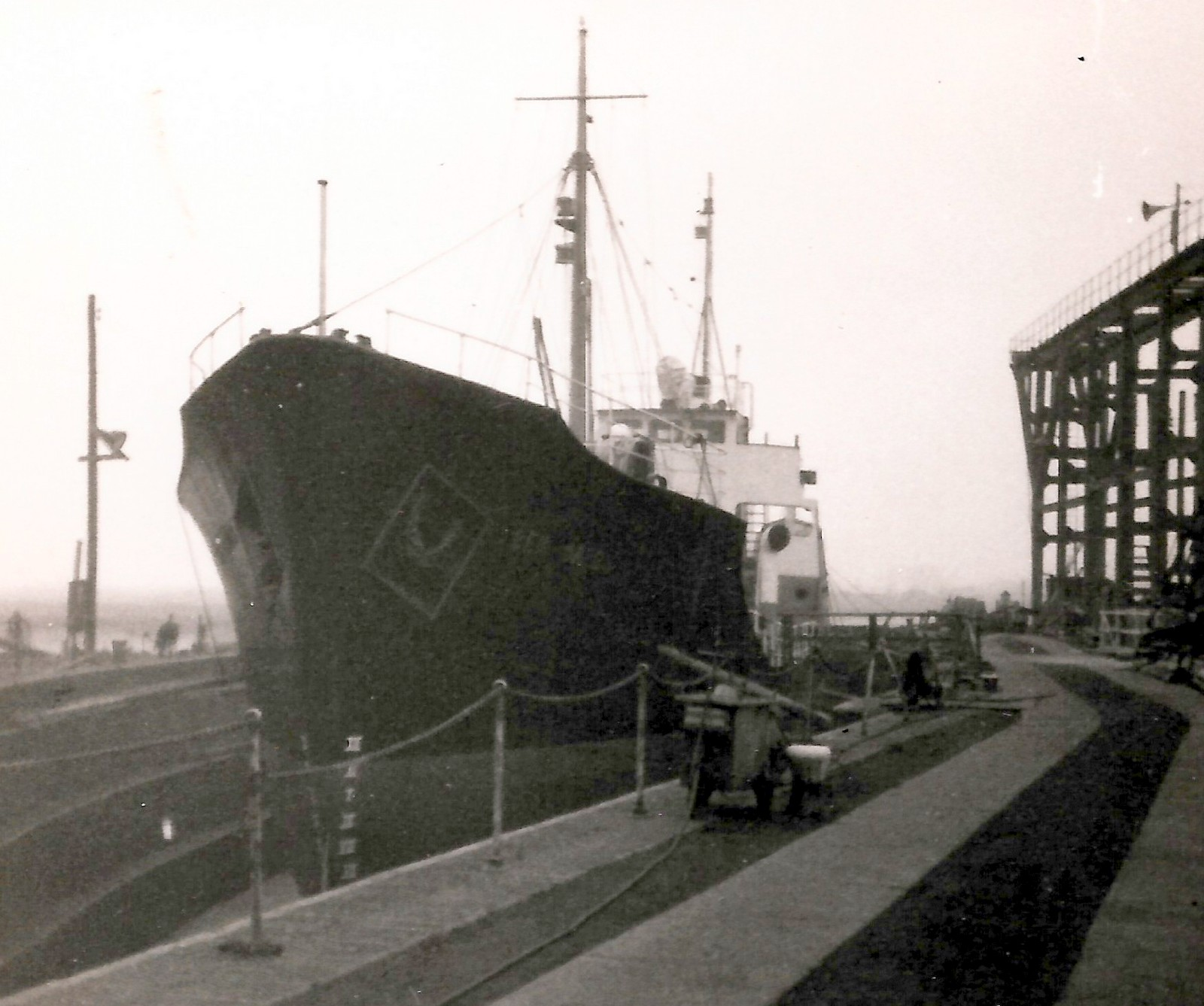
- Ben Bates in dry dock shortly after launch

History

United Kingdom
- Name: Ben Bates (1956–1972); Tana Woodward (1972–1987)
- Builder: Rowhedge Ironworks, Colchester
- Launched: 6 September 1956
- Completed: 1956
- Out of service: 1987
- Identification: IMO number: 5040378
- Fate: Scrapped 1987

General characteristics
- Tonnage: 489 (As built), 522 (1961), 565 (1967)
- Length: 48.7 m (159 ft 9 in)
- Beam: 8.5 m (27 ft 11 in)
- Draught: 3.5 m (11 ft 6 in)
- Depth: 3.9 m (12 ft 10 in)
- Installed power: 420 kW (560 bhp)
- Propulsion: 1 × 2-stroke, 6-cylinder diesel engine
- Capacity: 696 t (685 long tons; 767 short tons)

MV Ben Bates was a coastal tanker built for the National Benzole Company by Rowhedge Ironworks in 1956. She was sold to Shell-Mex and BP in 1959. In 1972 she was again sold, to Woodwards Oil, and renamed MV Tana Woodward in 1973. Her final sale was to Coastal Shipping in 1976. She was scrapped in 1987.
