= George Mills (shipbuilder) =

Scottish shipbuilder, journalist and novelist

George Mills (1808–1881) was a 19th-century Scottish shipbuilder, journalist and novelist.

== Life ==
He was born 13 April 1808, the son of William Mills, a successful merchant trading between American and Britain (with bases in Liverpool and Greenock, who was later Lord Provost of Glasgow. He studied at Glasgow University, but did not graduate, instead becoming a Manager of the Leith branch of his father's shipping company in 1827 (aged only 19). He organised steam packets between Leith and London from an office at Newhaven harbour.

In 1833/34 Mills went into independent business with a partner, Charles Wood, creating "Wood & Mills", based at Littlemills in Bowling west of Glasgow. Here they made iron-hull steamers and canal boats. Charles Wood dissolved the partnership around 1840 to set up alone, and Mills himself abandoned shipbuilding in 1844 due to a downturn in the market.

In 1845 he began working both as a stockbroker and as Manager of the Bowling and Balloch Railway Company and the Loch Lomond Steamship Company (based at Balloch). In 1857 he branched out into journalism, creating the Glasgow Advertiser and Shipping Gazette.

Around 1860 Mills went into some degree of partnership with the Clyde shipbuilders Tod & Macgregor who built a ship to Mills' design. This was one of the first ever double-hulled ship and was named the SS Alliance. The ship was used as a blockade runner in the American Civil War and was lost in 1867.

From 1866 Mills ran the Milton Chemical Works. In 1869 he set up a newspaper The Northern Star in Aberdeen (not to be confused with its Liverpool predecessor). From 1871 he was a literary critic for the Glasgow Mail.

He died at 6 India Street in Glasgow on 12 May 1881. He is presumed to be buried in the Mills family tomb at the Glasgow Necropolis.

== Family ==
He was married with one son and two daughters.

== Publications ==
- Craigclutha: A Tale of Old Glasgow and the West of Scotland (1857)
- I Remember (1858)
- The Beggar's Benison (1866)
