= MV Panagiotis =

Cargo ship built in 1937, wrecked in Greece

Coordinates: 37°51′34.57″N 20°37′29.5″E

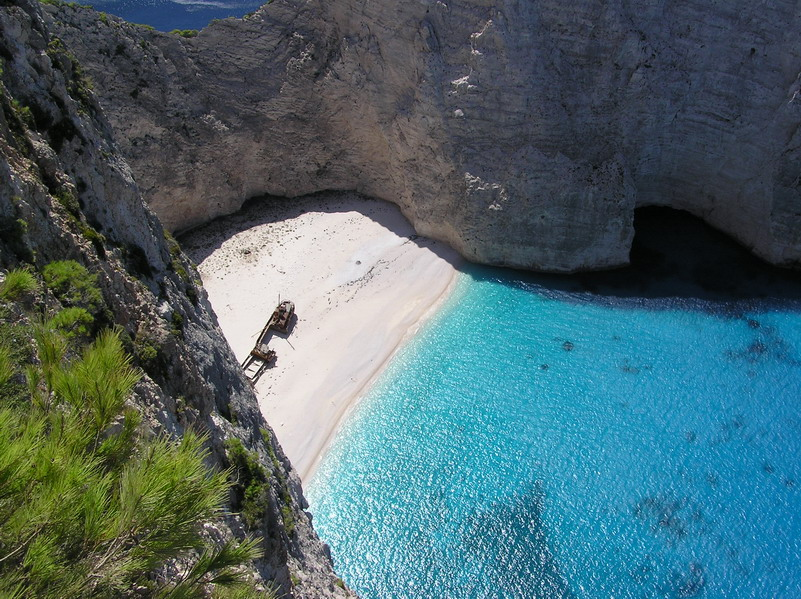
- Navagio (shipwreck) Bay

History
- Name: MV Saint Bedan
- Owner: M. J. & A. Gardner and Co. Ltd
- Port of registry: Glasgow United Kingdom
- Builder: Scott & Sons, Bowling
- Yard number: 341
- Launched: 14 January 1937
- Identification: IMO number: 5305546
- Fate: Sold 1964
- Name: MV Meropi
- Owner: M. Gigilinis and S. Kakassinas
- Port of registry: Thessaloniki, Greece
- Acquired: 1964
- Identification: IMO number: 5305546
- Fate: Sold 1966
- Name: MV Charis
- Owner: N. S. Kalfas
- Port of registry: Greece
- Acquired: 1966
- Identification: IMO number: 5305546
- Fate: Sold 1975
- Name: MV Panagiotis
- Owner: P. Lisikatos & Company
- Port of registry: Piraeus, Greece
- Acquired: 1975
- Identification: IMO number: 5305546
- Fate: Ran aground on Zakynthos, 1 October 1980
- Status: Abandoned on beach

General characteristics
- Type: Coaster
- Tonnage: 452 GRT
- Length: 156.8 ft (47.8 m)
- Beam: 25.6 ft (7.8 m)
- Draught: 14 ft (4.3 m)
- Installed power: 500 bhp
- Speed: 10 kn (19 km/h)

The Panagiotis (Greek: Παναγιώτης) is a shipwreck lying in the white sands of an exposed cove on the coast of Zakynthos, which is among the southernmost of the Ionian Islands of Greece. Navagio ("Shipwreck"), the spot where she lies, is a tourist attraction on the north-western side of the island, with thousands of visitors each year.

She was built in Scotland in 1937 as Saint Bedan and wrecked in 1980.

== History ==
The coaster Panagiotis was built in 1937 at Bowling on the River Clyde in Yard 341 by Scott & Sons, and fitted with a 532 bhp diesel engine made by British Auxiliaries Ltd. When built, she measured 157 feet in length and 26 feet in width. She had a draft of 14 feet, and a gross register tonnage of 452.

The Panagiotis changed hands and names since her construction.

- 1937 - Originally named the MV Saint Bedan, she was launched on Thursday, 14 January 1937 for J. & A. Gardner and Co. Ltd. of Glasgow.
- 1964 - Sold to Greek owners, M. Gigilinis and S. Kakassinas of Thessaloniki and renamed Meropi.
- 1966 - Sold to N. S. Kalfas and renamed Charis.
- 1975 - Sold to P. Lisikatos & Company of Piraeus and renamed Panagiotis.
- 1980 - Beached on the island of Zakynthos, 2 October 1980, and abandoned.

== Wreck ==
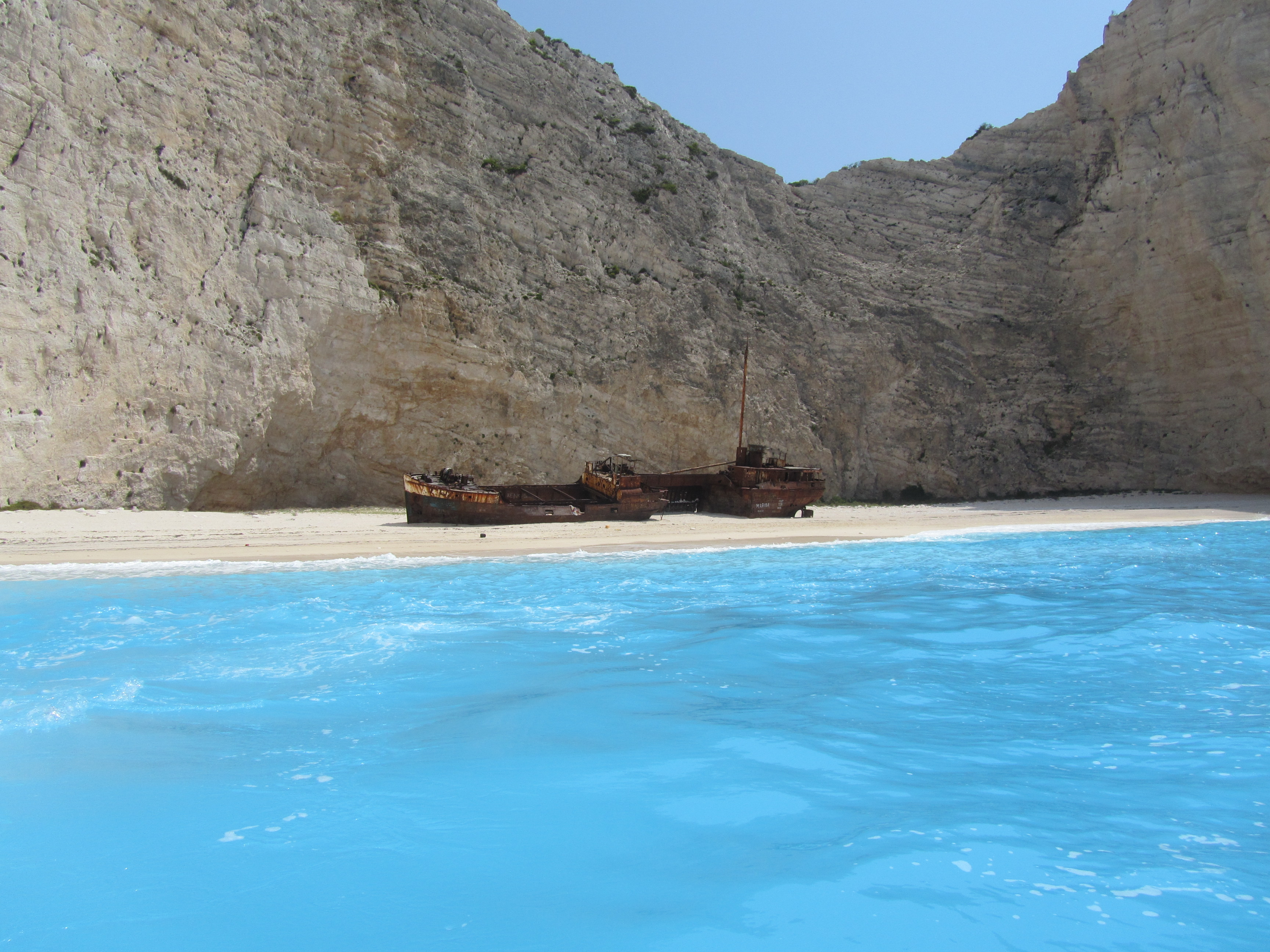
Navagio Beach and shipwreck of the Panagiotis

Numerous stories exist as to how the vessel became stranded in the cove. A popular story regarding the wreck of the Panagiotis maintains that she spent the latter part of her life as a smuggling ship. In 1980, during a time of record population lows on the island of Zakynthos, Panagiotis was allegedly making its way from Turkey with a freight of contraband cigarettes for the Italian Mafia, as some versions of the story assert. The crew was suspected by authorities, and so the Panagiotis was pursued by the Greek Navy. Encountering stormy weather, the ship ran aground in a shallow cove on the west coast of Zakynthos, to the north of Porto Vromi, where the crew abandoned her to evade the pursuing Navy. This story was backed up when court documents and photos relating to the incident were recently released.

Another story maintained that the ship was carrying legitimate cargo from Argostoli to Durrës in Albania, when the crew were forced to beach her in the cove during a storm on 2 October 1980. When part of the cargo and valuable equipment on the ship was looted, the captain, Charalambos Kompothekras-Kotsoros, alerted the authorities, and 29 locals were convicted of plundering the wreck. Kompothekras-Kotsoros was never charged with any offence.

The wreck remains at the site, which is now called "Navagio", Greek for "shipwreck".
