= Rowhedge Ironworks =

Coordinates: 51°51.4729′N 0°56.9291′E

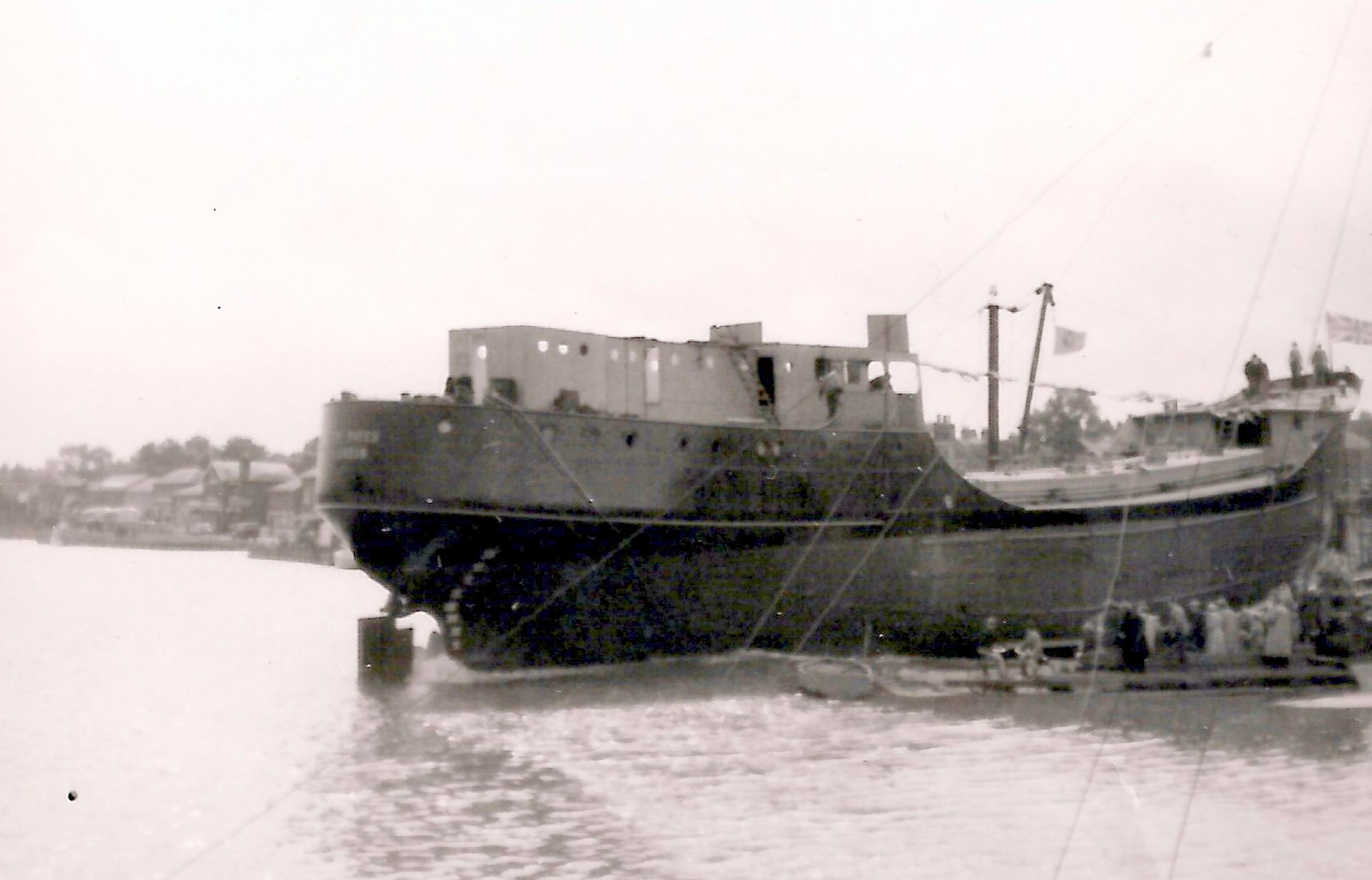
The Ben Bates is launched from Rowhedge Ironworks in 1956

Rowhedge Ironworks was a shipyard situated on the River Colne, and in the village of Rowhedge, in the English county of Essex. It existed from 1904 to 1964, and built a number of coastal vessels, including VIC type Clyde puffers and ferries for the Hythe Ferry in Southampton. The yard also specialised in building small craft for overseas buyers, often in kit form for assembly abroad, including vessels for use on Lake Titicaca and the River Nile.

The site of the yard is now occupied by a riverside housing development.

== Vessels built ==
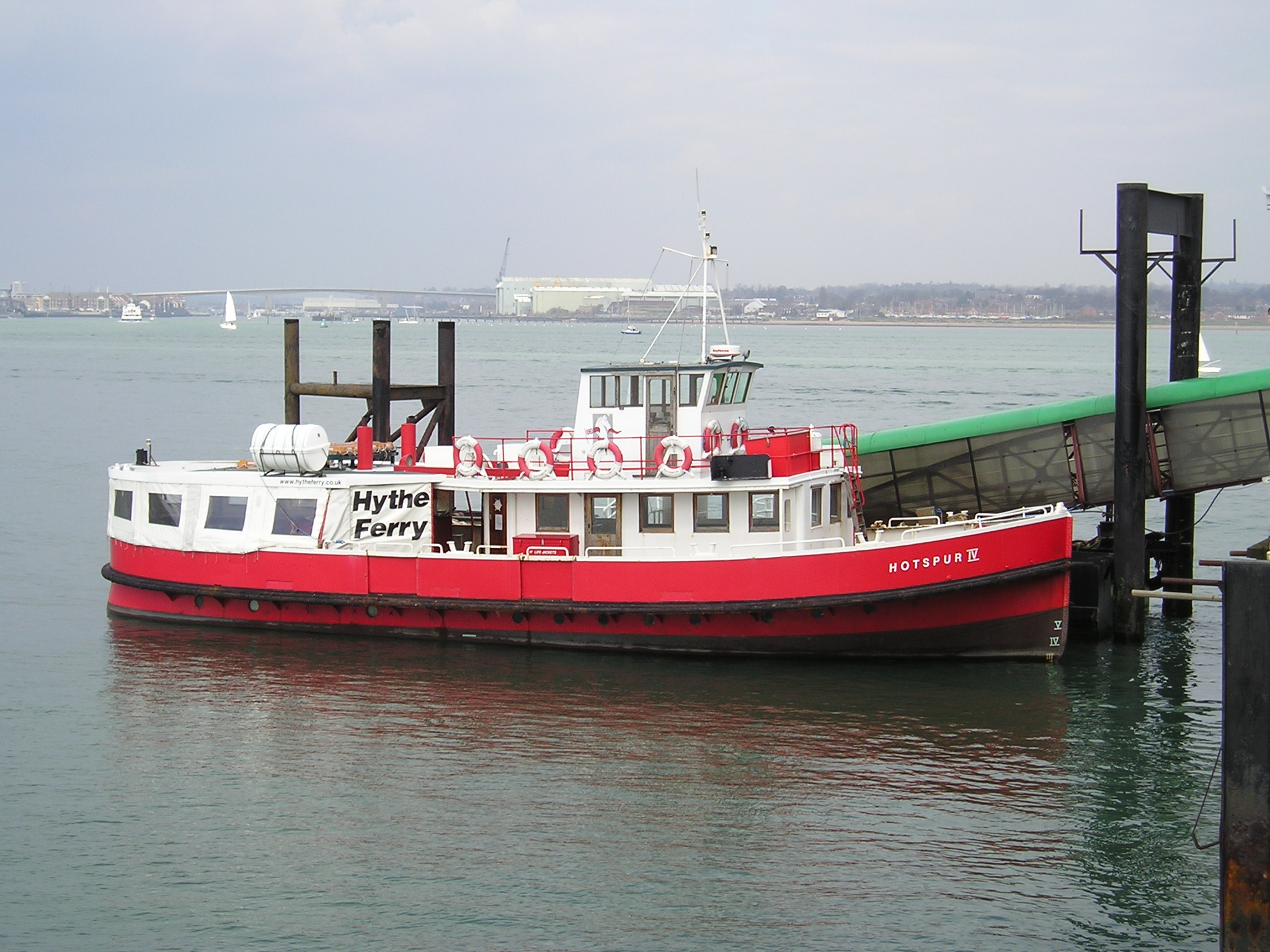
The Hotspur IV was built by Rowhedge Ironworks for the Hythe Ferry in 1946

In total, the Rowhedge Ironworks built some 900 vessels, including:

- Brightlingsea (1925)
- Hotspur II (1936)
- Hotspur III (1938)
- Guide of Dunkirk (1940)
- Empire Garnet (1941)
- Empire Lad (1941)
- Empire Homestead (1942)
- Empire Boxer (1943)
- VIC 76 (1945)
- VIC 77 (1945)
- VIC 78 (1945)
- Hotspur IV (1946)
- Ben Bates (1956)
