= MV Kenilworth =

Passenger ferry built in 1936

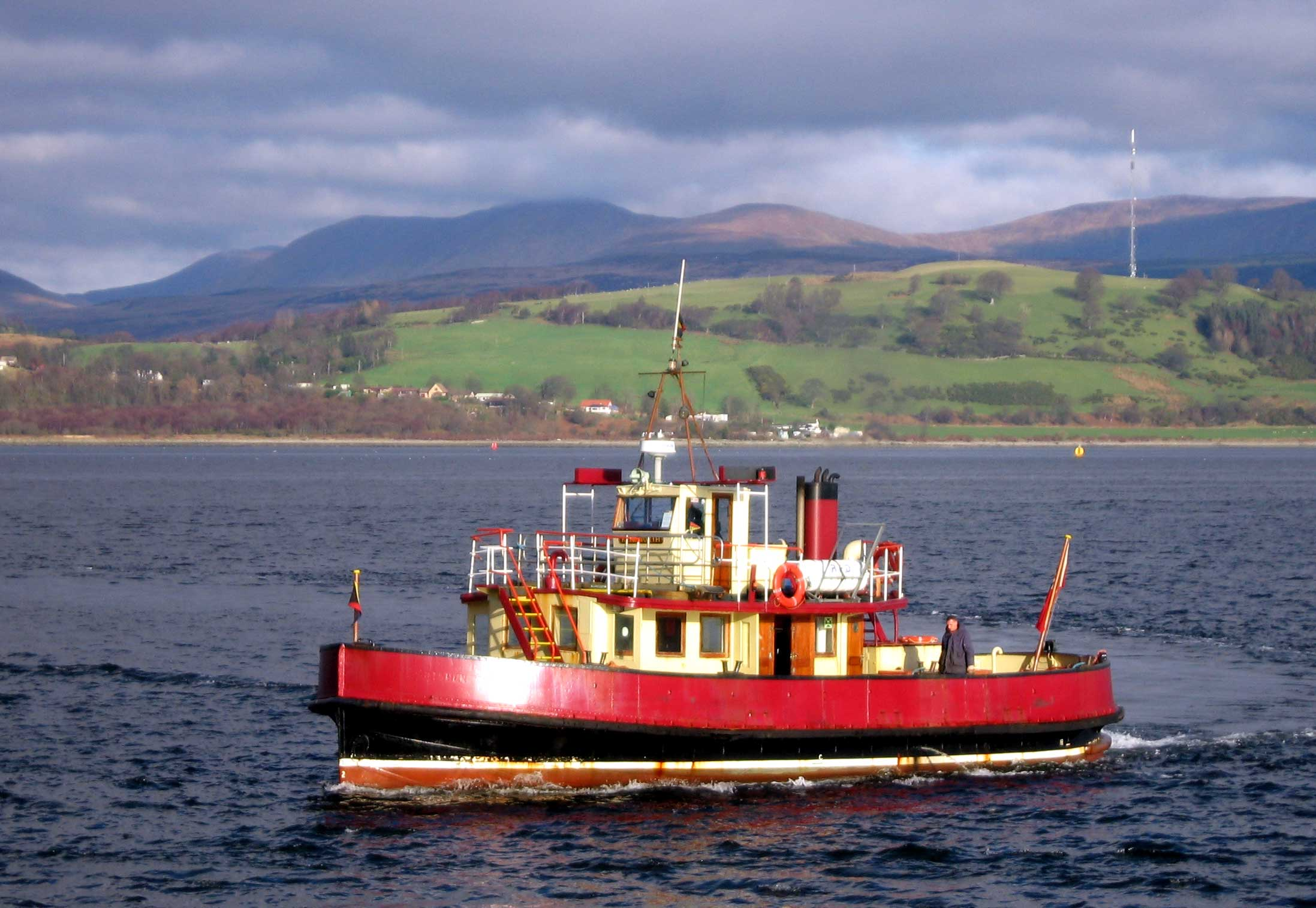
- MV Kenilworth arriving at Gourock pierhead.

History

United Kingdom
- Name: MV Hotspur II; MV Kenilworth
- Namesake: Hotspur or Henry Percy; Walter Scott novel Kenilworth
- Operator: 1936 – 1978: Hythe Ferry; 1979 – 2009: Clyde Marine Services
- Port of registry: Greenock
- Route: 1936 – 1978: Hythe Ferry; 1979 – 2007: Gourock – Kilcreggan ferry
- Builder: Rowhedge Ironworks, Colchester
- Out of service: 1 April 2007

General characteristics
- Displacement: 67 tons
- Length: 56 ft (17 m)
- Beam: 21 ft (6 m)
- Installed power: (i) 4L3 Gardner diesel engines; (ii) 2000 R6 Kelvin
- Speed: 9 knots
- Capacity: 80 passengers
- Crew: 2

MV Kenilworth is a historic passenger ferry built in 1936 as MV Hotspur II. She was used on the Hythe Ferry service across Southampton Water until 1978, and then on the Kilcreggan ferry on the Firth of Clyde until 2007.

== History ==
MV Hotspur II was built in 1936 by Rowhedge Ironworks as a passenger ferry for the Hythe Ferry service across Southampton Water. One of the Kenilworth's half-sisters, MV Hotspur IV, remained operational with the Hythe Ferry service until 2014. The use of the name Hotspur for several generations of Hythe ferries derives from the involvement, and later ownership, of the ferry service by the Percy family, whose member Hotspur was immortalised by William Shakespeare.

In 1978, Hotspur II was bought by Clyde Marine Motoring to operate the Gourock – Kilcreggan service. Arriving on the Clyde on 22 March, she was modified before entering service on 2 April 1979. Renamed Kenilworth, after the novel Kenilworth by Walter Scott, she provided the main ferry service, initially on subcontract to Caledonian MacBrayne and after 1983, on behalf of Strathclyde Passenger Transport Executive. Other company vessels (Clyde Marine Services Ltd. from 2003), including The Second Snark and CalMac vessels provided relief.

Along with The Second Snark, Kenilworth was listed in the UK Historic Ship Register from 2001.

Replaced by the purpose-built MV Seabus in 2007, she continued to provide morning and afternoon cruises. In 2009, she was reported to be sold to a new owner in Inverness and was reportedly sold again in 2018 for conversion into a houseboat. Kenilworth is berthed in Hartlepool undergoing restoration

=== 2006 Incident ===
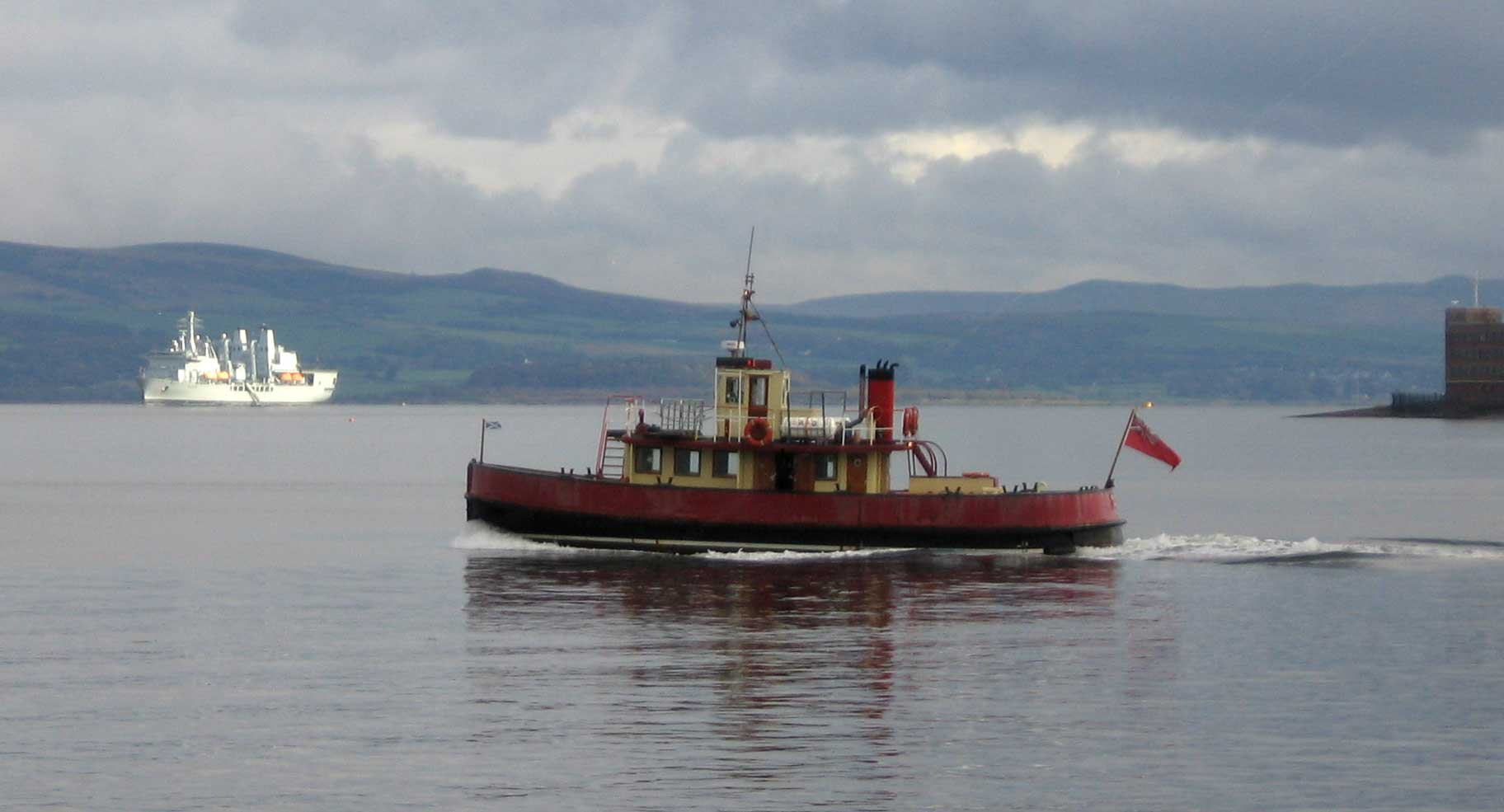
Setting out from Gourock on 23 October 2006, with naval supply ship Fort George in the background.

At 9.40 am BST on 23 October 2006, a US Navy warship taking part in the Neptune Warrior training exercise radioed the Kenilworth to warn "Unidentified vessel approaching on my starboard side, please identify yourself. If you fail to do so, we will open fire on you with live ammunition." The message caused alarm as it was broadcast on VHF channel 16, the international calling and distress frequency. A spokeswoman at Faslane indicated that channel 16 had been correctly used to request identification, but should not have been used for the warning which should have been on an exercise frequency. She stated that the ferry had not been in any danger, and advised that the organiser of the exercise, Commander Don Chalmers, deputy director of the Joint Maritime Operational Training Staff, had apologised to the skipper.

== Layout ==
There is covered passenger accommodation on two decks forward, with a bar in the lower saloon.

She was re-engined in 2000.

== Service ==
- Hythe Ferry service across Southampton Water
- Gourock – Kilcreggan – service on the Firth of Clyde. She also crossed Gare Loch to Helensburgh and provided cruises and charters in summer.
