= Bowling, West Dunbartonshire =

Coordinates: 55.932°N 4.494°W

Bowling: Scottish Gaelic: Bolan; Scots: Bowlin
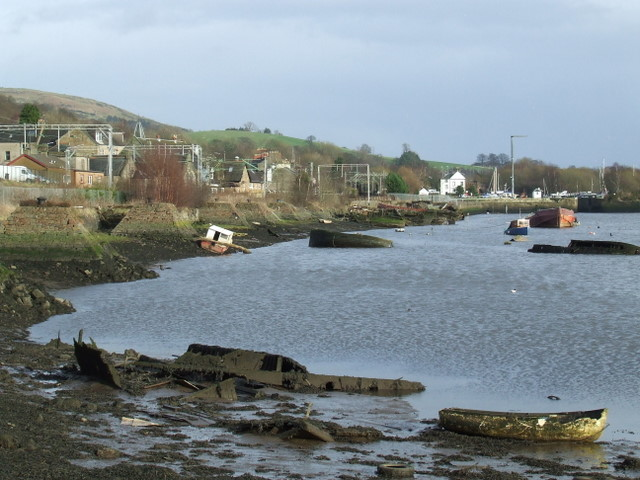
- Bowling Harbour in 2008

- Location within West Dunbartonshire
- Population: 560 (2020)
- OS grid reference: NS445737
- Civil parish: Old Kilpatrick
- Council area: West Dunbartonshire
- Lieutenancy area: Dunbartonshire
- Country: Scotland
- Sovereign state: United Kingdom
- Post town: GLASGOW
- Postcode district: G60
- Dialling code: 01389
- Police: Scotland
- Fire: Scottish
- Ambulance: Scottish
- UK Parliament: West Dunbartonshire
- Scottish Parliament: Dumbarton

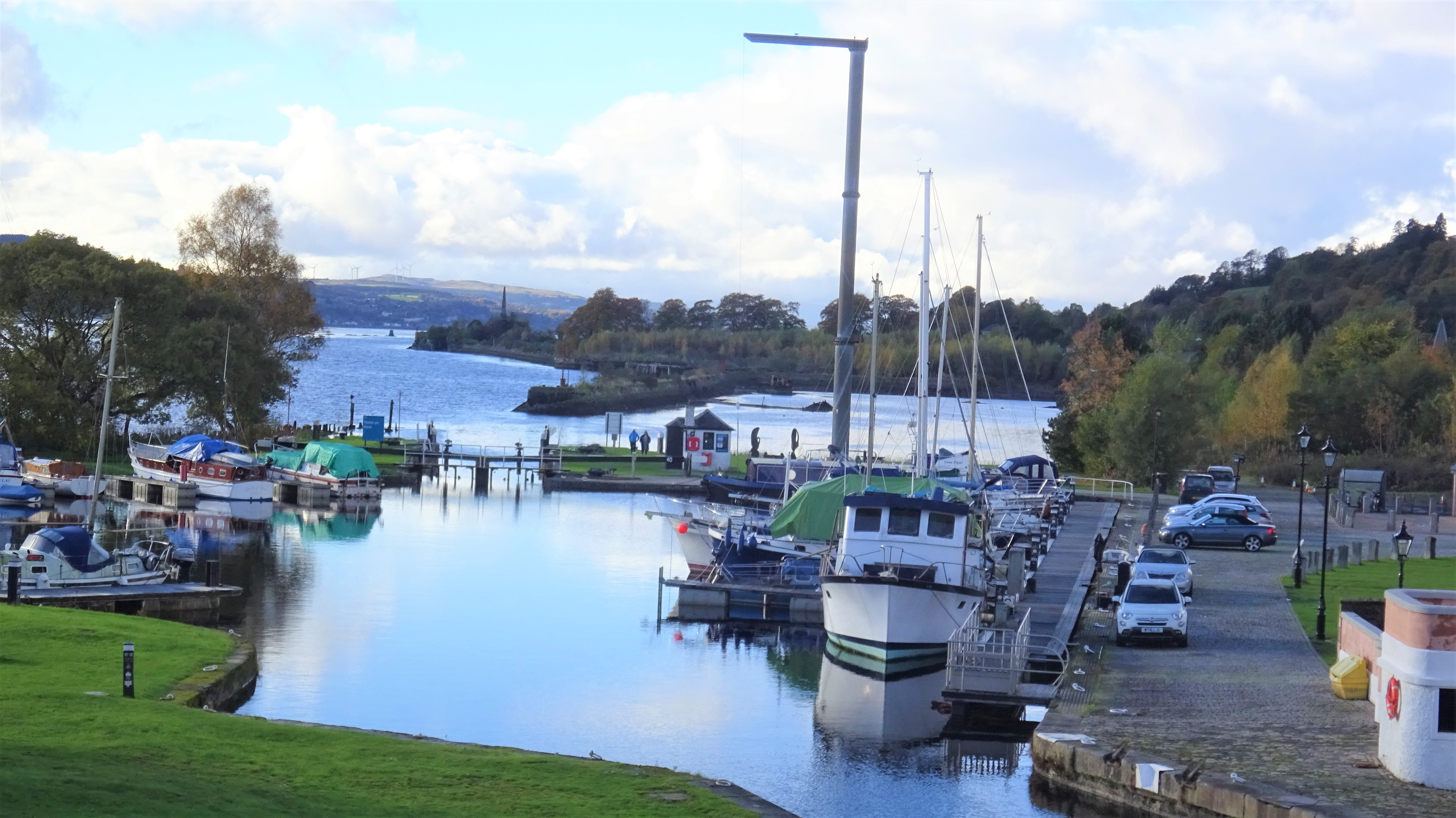
Bowling Canal Basin

Bowling (Scots: Bowlin, Scottish Gaelic: Bolan) is a village in West Dunbartonshire, Scotland, with a population of 740 (2015).

It lies on the north bank of the Firth of Clyde, between the towns of Clydebank and Dumbarton. It is 1 1/2 miles (2.5 kilometres) west of Old Kilpatrick which is at one end of the Antonine Wall and therefore represents the extreme limit of the Roman Empire on the west coast of the island of Great Britain.

== Forth and Clyde Canal ==
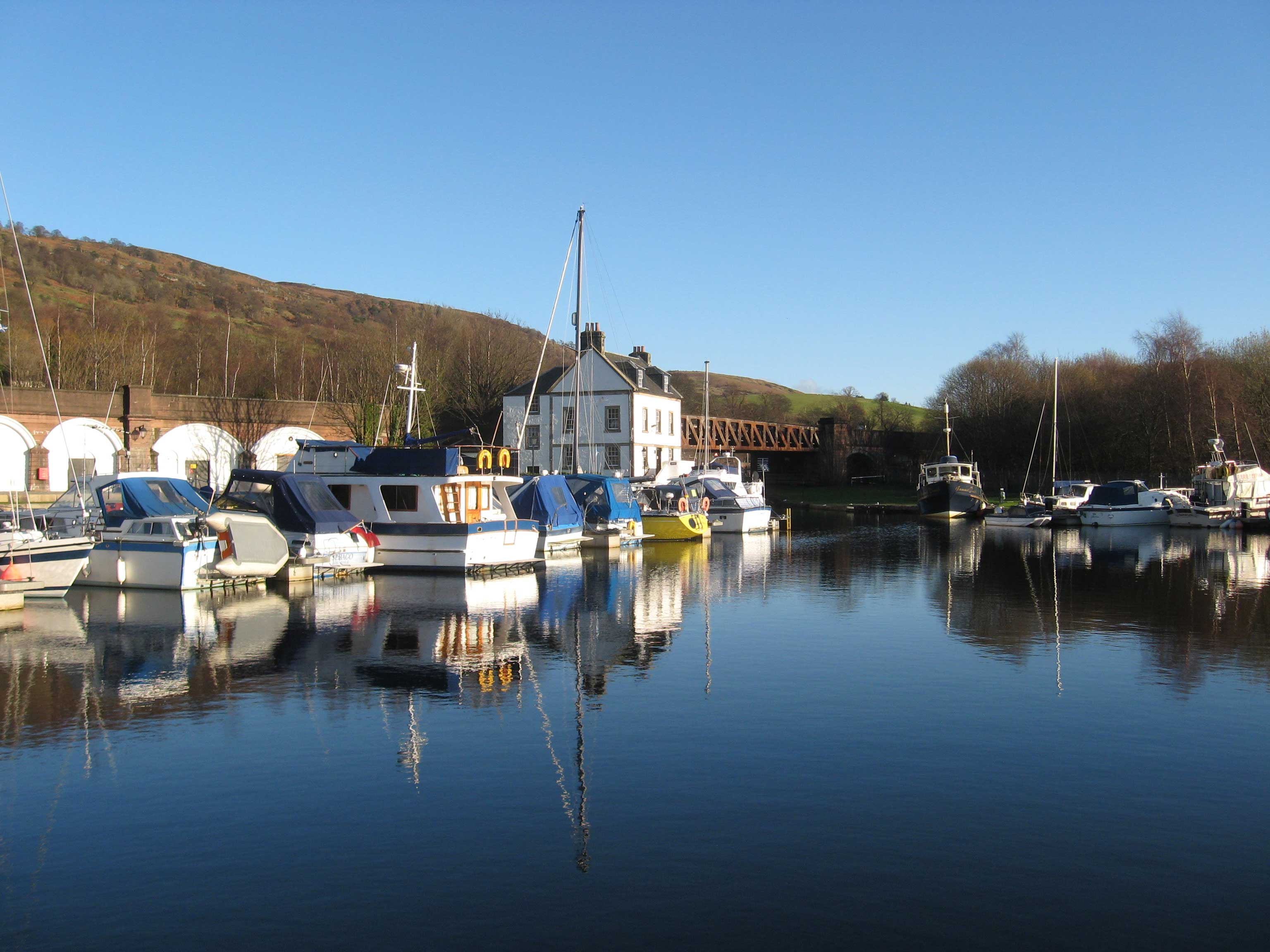
Bowling basin, with the railway arches and bridge of the disused Lanarkshire and Dunbartonshire Railway.

Bowling is the location of the western terminus of the Forth and Clyde Canal, opened in 1790, and it is the western gateway to the Lowland canals.

In 2008, British Waterways Scotland, in conjunction with Scottish Enterprise Dunbartonshire, completed a £1.4 million regeneration programme at Bowling Basin to provide additional moorings and improved facilities. At the time there were plans for future use of an area of 140 acres (60 hectares) of land adjacent to Bowling, in conjunction with Clydeport.

In June 2008, Provost Denis Agnew, joined local schoolchildren and community groups to celebrate the completion of a £163,000 project to improve seven kilometres of towpath on the Forth & Clyde Canal from Bowling Harbour to Whitecrook in Clydebank.

In 2007, Bowling welcomed the "Vital Spark", one of only five surviving Clyde puffers, and the first of its kind to sail into Bowling Harbour for more than 40 years. The Forth & Clyde Canal is regarded as the birthplace of the puffers, which had to be small enough to negotiate the Crinan Canal. The archetypal puffer, the Vital Spark, appeared in the "Para Handy" books by Neil Munro and two television series of the same name.

== Shipbuilding in Bowling ==
Bowling has been long associated with shipbuilding and ship repairing. The opening of the Forth and Clyde canal at Bowling in 1790 increased the number of vessels passing through the small village on their way to Glasgow.

The first shipbuilding name in Bowling is that of Thomas McGill, originally from Glasgow. He rented the Graving dock in 1800, for which he paid £25 in the first year. McGill and two of his sons built vessels at Bowling until 1843 when the yard was forced to close due to an extension of the Forth and Clyde Canal basin.

In 1834 George Mills and Charles Wood entered into partnership, opening a shipyard at Littlemill in Bowling, at the other end of the bay from Thomas MacGill. This partnership did not last long, as Charles Wood left to set up a shipyard in Dumbarton on his own. In 1840/1 George Mills retired from shipbuilding and the shipyard closed.

In 1851 a new partnership was formed at Bowling between Thomas McGill's two sons, David and Thomas, and James Scott, whose father owned land at Littlemill. The company was known as Scott & MacGill. The shipyard was located on ground known as Frisky Hall Orchard and this small yard built wooden sailing vessels until, in 1874, it built its first iron vessel.

In 1876 Thomas McGill retired from the firm, leaving James Scott on his own and the name of the company was changed to Scott and Company. A partnership was formed in 1892 between James Scott and his two sons, Charles Wood Scott and James Scott Junior. The firm's name was changed again, to Scott and Sons. The firm continued to prosper well into the twentieth century, building in excess of 450 vessels, many of these being passenger vessels and coasters for Gardner & Stewart. In 1958, following the retirement of James W. Scott, the firm became a limited company, trading under the name Scott Sons (Bowling) Limited.

In June 1965, the company was taken over by Scotts Shipbuilding and Engineering Company of Greenock. In 1979 the decision was taken to close the shipbuilding yard. The last vessel to leave the yard was the Laggan built for Forth Tugs Limited of Grangemouth.

- MV Panagiotis

One well-known ship built by Scott was the MV Saint Bedan, launched in January 1937. After several changes of ownership and name, it became MV Panagiotis and allegedly spent its later life as a smuggling ship in the Ionian Sea. It ran aground at Navagio Beach on the Ionian Island of Zakynthos (Zante) in 1980, becoming one of the most picturesque and well-visited shipwrecks in the world.

== Fuel oil terminal ==
The former ExxonMobil fuel oil terminal site, is now a proposed mixed use redevelopment location.

== Sport ==
A football club from the village, Bowling F.C., played in the Scottish Cup in the late 19th century.

== Famous former residents ==
- William Burrell, art collector
- Hector Grey, businessman
- Neil Kerr, footballer
- George Mills-shipbuilder
- Talwin Morris, leader in the Glasgow Style movement
- George Murdoch, former Lord Provost of Glasgow
- John Murray, abolitionist
- Annette Pearse, gallery director

== Glenarbuck House ==
Glenarbuck House is a Category B listed building in Bowling. It was built in 1804 for the merchant Gilbert Hamilton (1744–1808) who was the first president of the Glasgow Humane Society, a founding member of Glasgow Chamber of Commerce and Glasgow's Lord Provost in 1792. Later owners included the Duke of Sutherland and the Scott family of the shipbuilders Scott and Sons.

== Rail transport ==
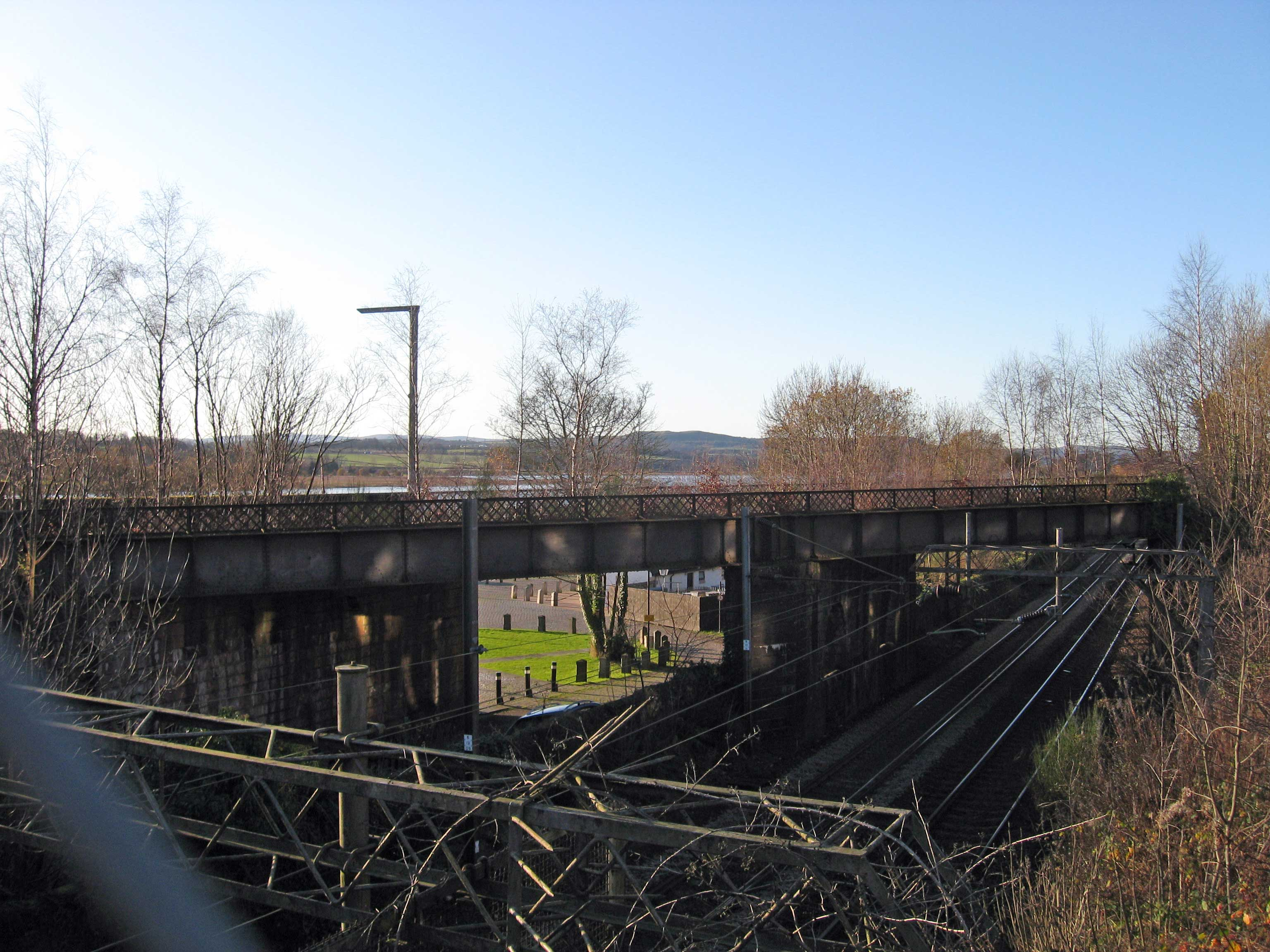
The disused Lanarkshire and Dunbartonshire Railway crosses over the North Clyde line just north of Bowling Basin.

Bowling railway station opened in 1850 when the North Clyde line ran via Dumbarton to Balloch. In 1858 the line was extended to progress to Glasgow to the east, and Helensburgh to the west. Between 1896 and 1951, the village was also served by a second station, on Caledonian Railway's Lanarkshire and Dunbartonshire Railway line. Its former trackbed now forms a footpath and cycleway through the village.

Today ScotRail services call at Bowling, two trains per hour each direction.

== Bowling today ==
Bowling is in the same parish as Old Kilpatrick Church and the former church in Bowling has been converted into housing.

The village has an annual Gala Day in June, at which a girl is crowned Queen for a day. The ceremony starts at Bowling Memorial Park and continues to Bowling Hall.

== See also ==
- List of places in West Dunbartonshire
- Forth to Firth Canal Pathway
- Donald's Quay
