= List of listed buildings in Old Kilpatrick, West Dunbartonshire =

This is a list of listed buildings in the parish of Old Kilpatrick in West Dunbartonshire, Scotland.

== List ==
Name	Location	Date listed	Geo-coordinates	Notes	Category	LB number	Image
Bowling, Great Western Road, Glenarbuck House Including Sundial			55°55′56″N 4°28′39″W		B	14409	Upload Photo
Milton Primary School Including Boundary Walls, Gatepiers And Railings			55°56′11″N 4°31′14″W		B	49861	Upload Photo
Bowling Basin, Swing Bridge			55°55′48″N 4°28′50″W		B	18845	Upload Photo
Bowling, Upper Canal Basin And Lock			55°55′48″N 4°28′46″W		B	18843	Upload Photo
Dunglass Castle			55°55′46″N 4°30′09″W		B	14399	Upload Photo
Parish Church And Graveyard			55°54′35″N 4°24′10″W		B	14404	Upload Photo
Obelisk Memorial To Henry Bell			55°55′46″N 4°30′08″W		B	14400	Upload Photo
Milton House			55°56′25″N 4°31′14″W		B	14401	Upload Photo
Cochno			55°56′15″N 4°24′29″W		B	14405	Upload Photo
Old Secession Church			55°55′23″N 4°27′23″W		B	14407	Upload Photo
Customs House, Bowling			55°55′48″N 4°28′52″W		B	14411	Upload another image
Duntocher, Dumbarton Road, Duntocher West United Free Church, Including Boundary Wall And Railings			55°55′23″N 4°25′08″W		C(S)	51043	Upload Photo
Littlemill Distillery, Former Exciseman's House And Boundary Wall, Dumbarton Road, Bowling			55°55′54″N 4°29′45″W		B	19656	Upload Photo
Lusset Road, Lusset House			55°55′26″N 4°27′11″W		B	18987	Upload Photo
Bowling, Lower Canal Basin And Entrance			55°55′47″N 4°28′55″W		B	18844	Upload Photo
Dumbuck Hotel			55°56′15″N 4°32′19″W		B	14403	Upload another image
2 Canal Drawbridges at Bowling			55°55′48″N 4°28′49″W		B	14410	Upload Photo
Bowling, Upper Canal Basin, Lock Keeper's Houses			55°55′48″N 4°28′43″W		B	18842	Upload Photo
Edinbarnet House			55°56′17″N 4°23′40″W		B	14408	Upload Photo
Old Kilpatrick, Great Western Road, Gavinburn Farm			55°55′47″N 4°28′08″W		C(S)	50228	Upload Photo
Old Mill, In Ground of Milton House			55°56′25″N 4°31′18″W		B	14402	Upload Photo
Stables, Cochno			55°56′19″N 4°24′28″W		B	14406	Upload Photo
Clydebank, Lilac Avenue, Mountblow Football Pavilion			55°55′06″N 4°26′15″W		C(S)	51260	Upload Photo

== Key ==
The scheme for classifying buildings in Scotland is:

- Category A: "buildings of national or international importance, either architectural or historic; or fine, little-altered examples of some particular period, style or building type."
- Category B: "buildings of regional or more than local importance; or major examples of some particular period, style or building type, which may have been altered."
- Category C: "buildings of local importance; lesser examples of any period, style, or building type, as originally constructed or moderately altered; and simple traditional buildings which group well with other listed buildings."

In March 2016 there were 47,288 listed buildings in Scotland. Of these, 8% were Category A, and 50% were Category B, with the remaining 42% being Category C.
