= MV Chieftain =

Passenger ferry

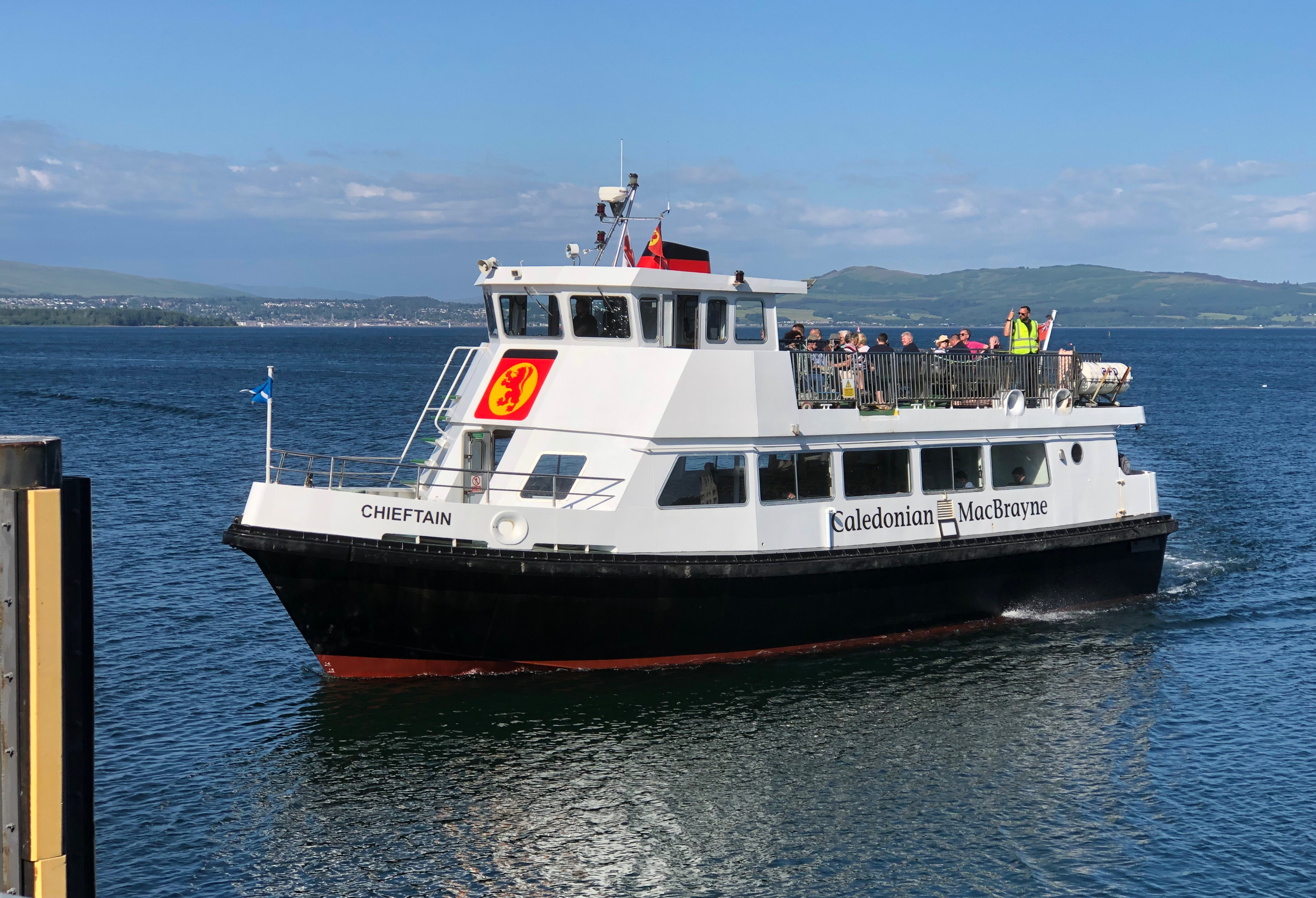
- Chieftain in CalMac livery at Gourock, 2021

History

United Kingdom
- Name: MV Seabus
- Owner: Clyde Marine Services
- Operator: Caledonian MacBrayne
- Port of registry: Greenock
- Route: Gourock – Kilcreggan
- Builder: Voyager Boatyard, Millbrook, near Plymouth
- Christened: 30 March 2007 at Kilcreggan Pier.
- Maiden voyage: 1 April 2007
- Identification: MMSI number: 235052285; Callsign: MQBU9
- Notes: designed by Jonathan Graham CEng MRINA

General characteristics
- Tonnage: 60 GT
- Length: 19.5 m (64.0 ft)
- Beam: 6.2 m (20.3 ft)
- Installed power: 2x 180 hp Gardner diesel engines
- Speed: 10.2 (max) / 8.6 knots
- Capacity: 100 passengers

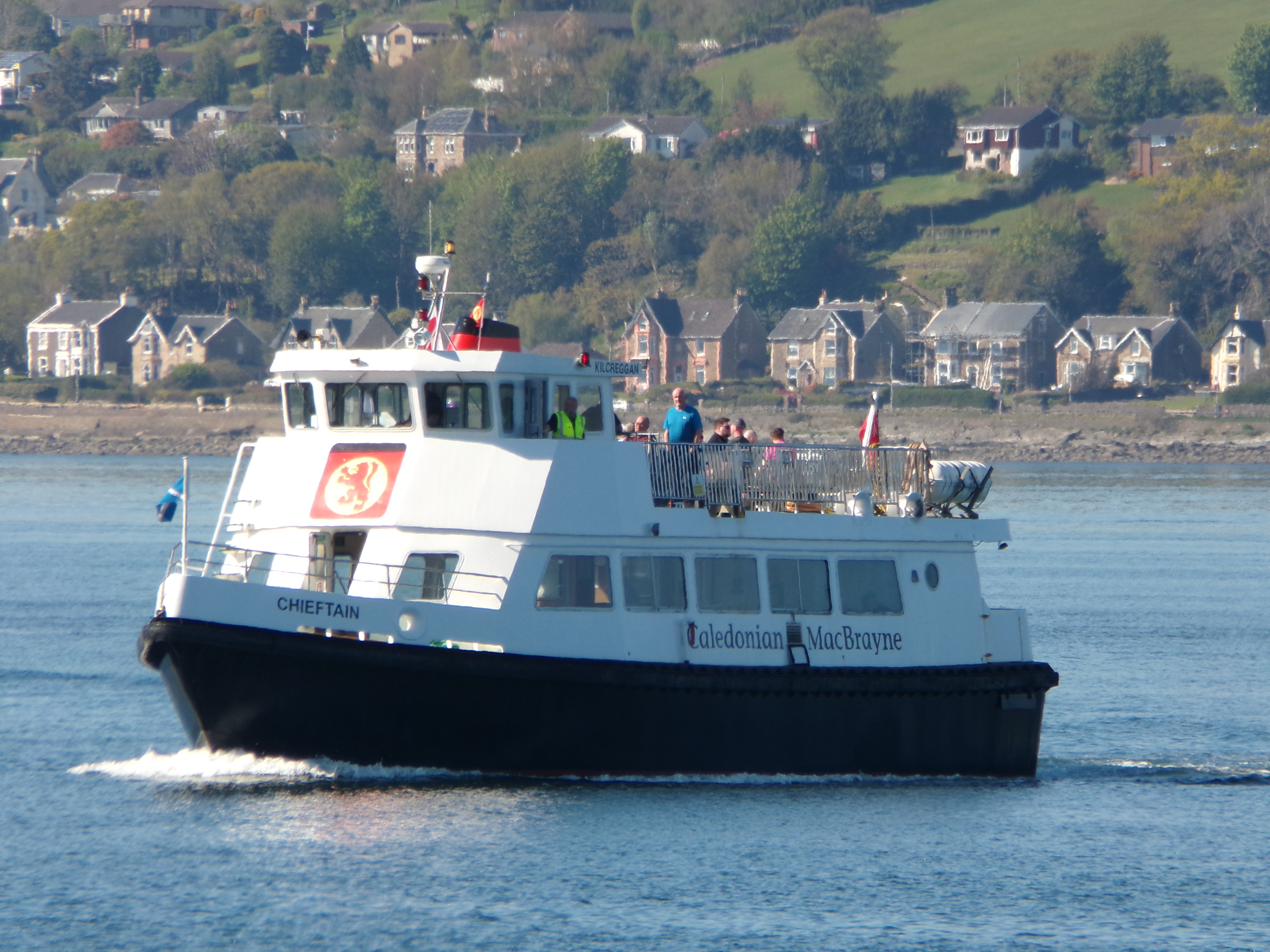
MV Chieftain arriving at Gourock with the CalMac Livery.

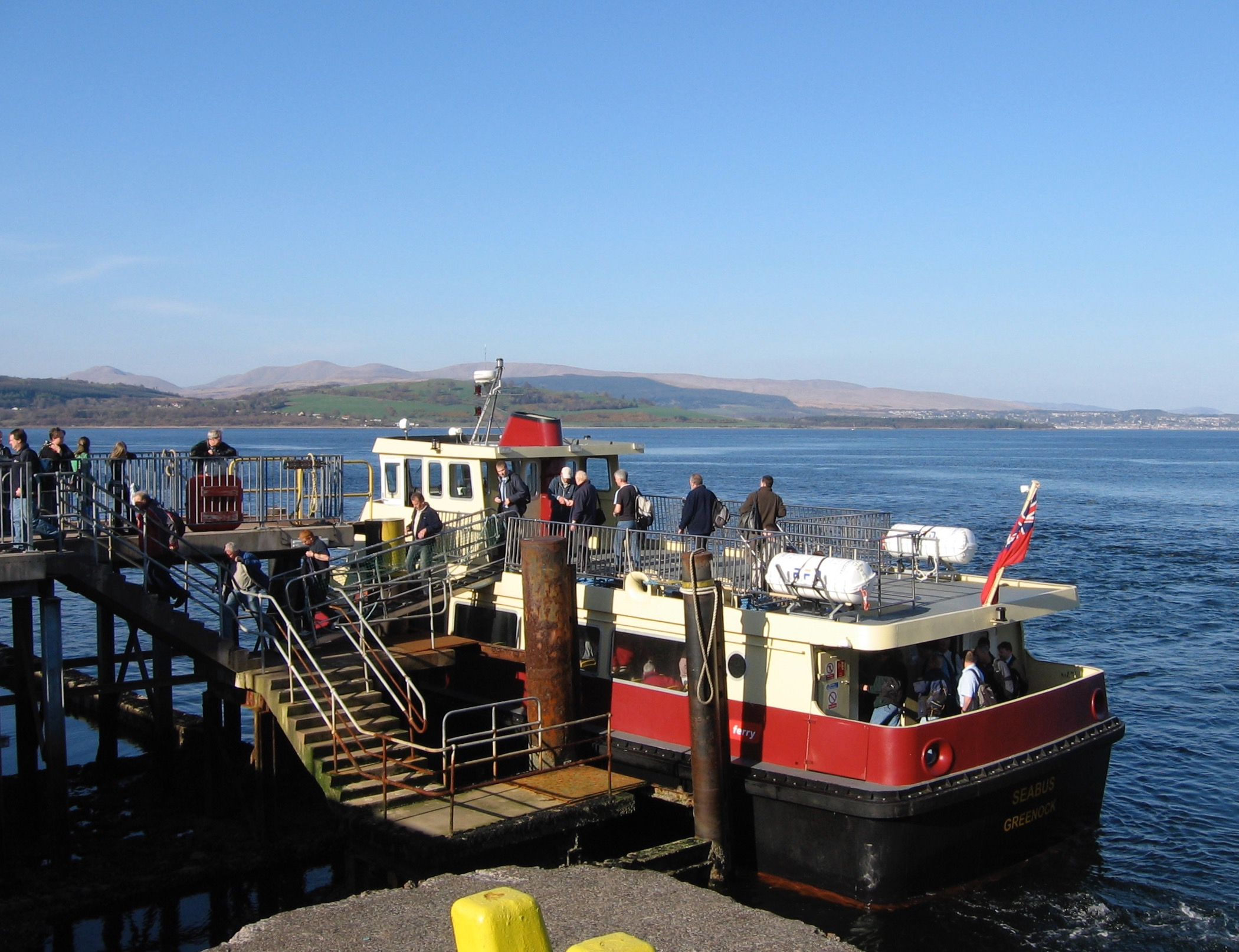
Seabus passengers disembark in April 2007

MV Chieftain, ex-Seabus, is a passenger ferry built in 2007 for Clyde Marine Services to run the Strathclyde Partnership for Transport (SPT) Gourock to Kilcreggan service on the Firth of Clyde.

From 2012 to 2018 the service was run by Clydelink with a smaller boat, while Seabus carried out cruises or other work and was renamed Chieftain.

After dissatisfaction with Clydelink, the contract went in May 2018 to Clyde Marine, and Chieftain returned to the Kilcreggan service. In June 2020, CalMac took over managing the service from SPT, leasing Chieftain which was repainted in CalMac livery in 2021.

== History ==
MV Seabus was built in Cornwall, in 2007, as a 'dedicated' passenger ferry to replace the 71-year-old MV Kenilworth on the service between Gourock, Kilcreggan and Helensburgh, across the Firth of Clyde (Tail of the Bank). Owned by Clyde Marine, Seabus operated the main ferry service to Kicreggan, with crossings of Gare Loch to Helensburgh, for the Strathclyde Partnership for Transport (SPT) who subsidised the route, and was painted in the SPT carmine and cream livery.

On re-tendering, the Helensburgh part of the then 'triangular' route ceased and the contract for the Gourock - Kilcreggan service was awarded to Clydelink. To operate the route, Clydelink bought the smaller MV Island Princess from Lymington, which had been a harbour excursion vessel, and commenced service on 1 April 2012. The change was unpopular with a loss of jobs.

The hull of Seabus was painted dark blue to match Clyde Marine livery, then in 2014 it was renamed Chieftain. It carried out work for hire in the Highlands, including parts of the Caledonian Canal, and on the Firth of Forth.

Clydelink were unreliable. Their contract was terminated early and the work awarded to Clyde Marine, who resumed the Gourock to Kilcreggan ferry service on 14 May 2018 with Chieftain. After negotiations, CalMac took over the contract from 1 June 2020, leasing Chieftain from Clyde Marine and giving crew the option of transferring to the new operator.

== Layout ==
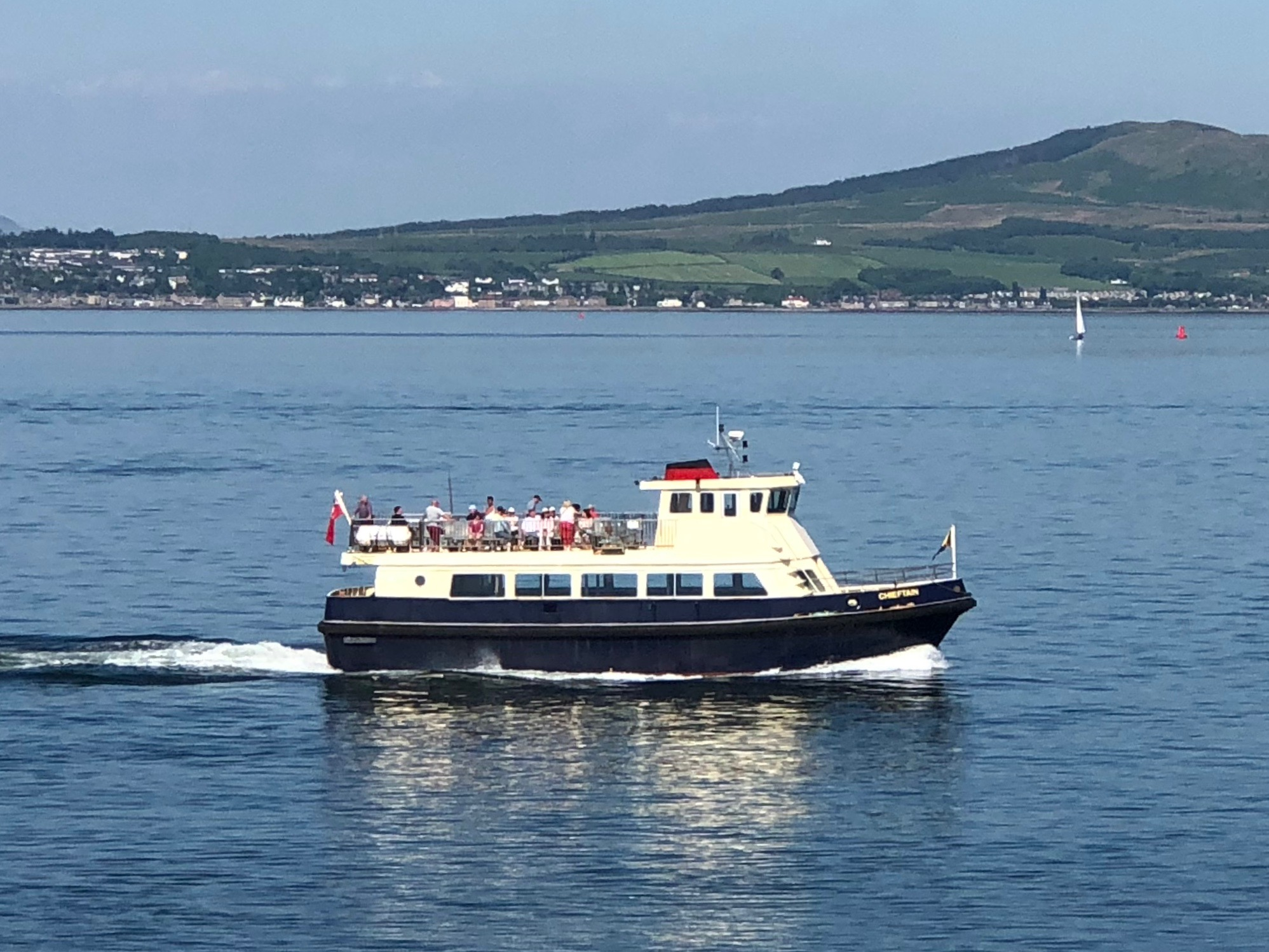
Chieftain in Clyde Marine livery, with improved seating on the top deck, back on the route in May 2018.

MV Seabus brought a greater degree of comfort and safety to the route with a sealed and heated passenger cabin. Larger, roomier and more comfortable than her predecessor, she has better facilities for people with mobility problems.

== Service ==
- Gourock – Kilcreggan – Helensburgh service on the Firth of Clyde and the Gare Loch (the service to Helensburgh was withdrawn in April 2012).
