= Navagio Beach =

Cove/beach on Zakynthos, Greece

Shipwreck Beach
- Location within Greece
- Coordinates: 37.8596°N 20.6245°E

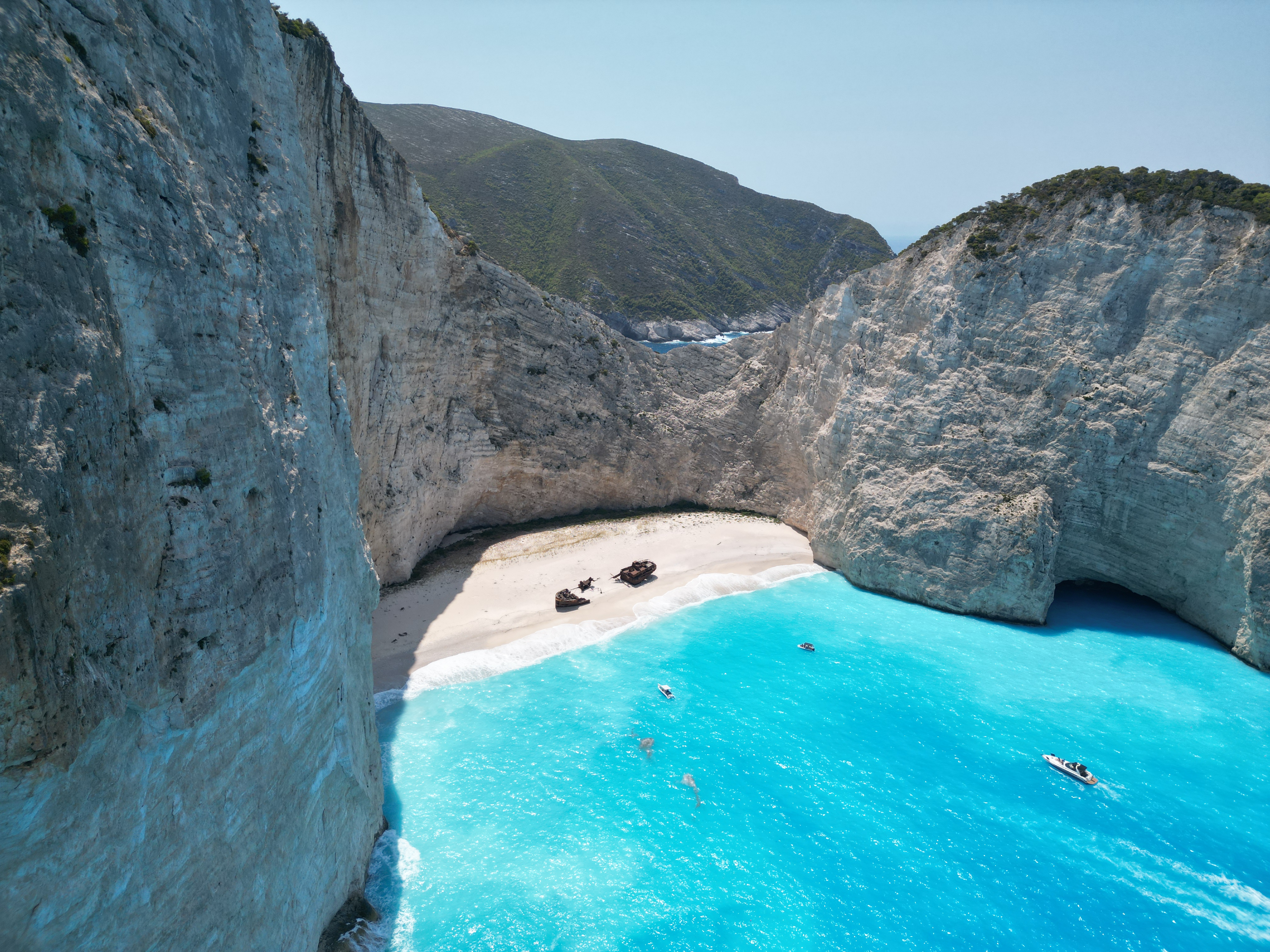
Navagio Beach and wreck of the MV Panagiotis.

Navagio Beach (Greek: Παραλία Ναυάγιο, pronounced [naˈvaʝio]), or Shipwreck Beach, is an exposed cove, sometimes referred to as "Smugglers Cove", on the coast of Zakynthos, in the Ionian Islands of Greece. It is one of the most famous and photographed beaches in the world.

== In popular culture ==
The location was prominently featured in the hit Korean drama Descendants of the Sun, leading to a surge of interest among Chinese and Korean tourists.

== History and namesake ==
The cove was originally known by the name Agios Georgios (St George).

On 5 October 1980, the coaster MV Panagiotis ran aground in the waters around Zakynthos Island on Navagio Beach during stormy weather and bad visibility. Some rumours claim the ship was smuggling contraband; however, official sources did not confirm this, and the captain was not convicted for such offences at the time. Recently released court documents and photos relating to the incident back up the smuggler story, suggesting that Panagiotis was allegedly making its way from Turkey with a freight of contraband cigarettes headed for Italy. Encountering stormy weather, the ship ran aground in the cove, where the crew abandoned her to evade the pursuing Navy. The ship was abandoned and still rests buried in the limestone gravel of the beach that now bears the nickname Shipwreck.

The beach was briefly closed in 2018, and swimming and boat anchoring were forbidden, after a cliff above the beach collapsed. The beach reopened and anchoring is permitted, but with restrictions out of concerns over future landslides.

In September 2022 another landslide occurred, after a 5.4-magnitude earthquake took place between Kefalonia and Zakynthos. After this the beach was closed to locals and visitors and will remain closed for the whole summer of 2023 till at least September. The decision to prohibit access to the Navagio beach was recommended by a team of experts from the Earthquake Planning and Protection Organization (OASP), following a visit to the site on March 8 2023, as part of a regular reassessment of its safety. Boats will be able to approach but swimming will not be allowed near the beach.

== Gallery ==
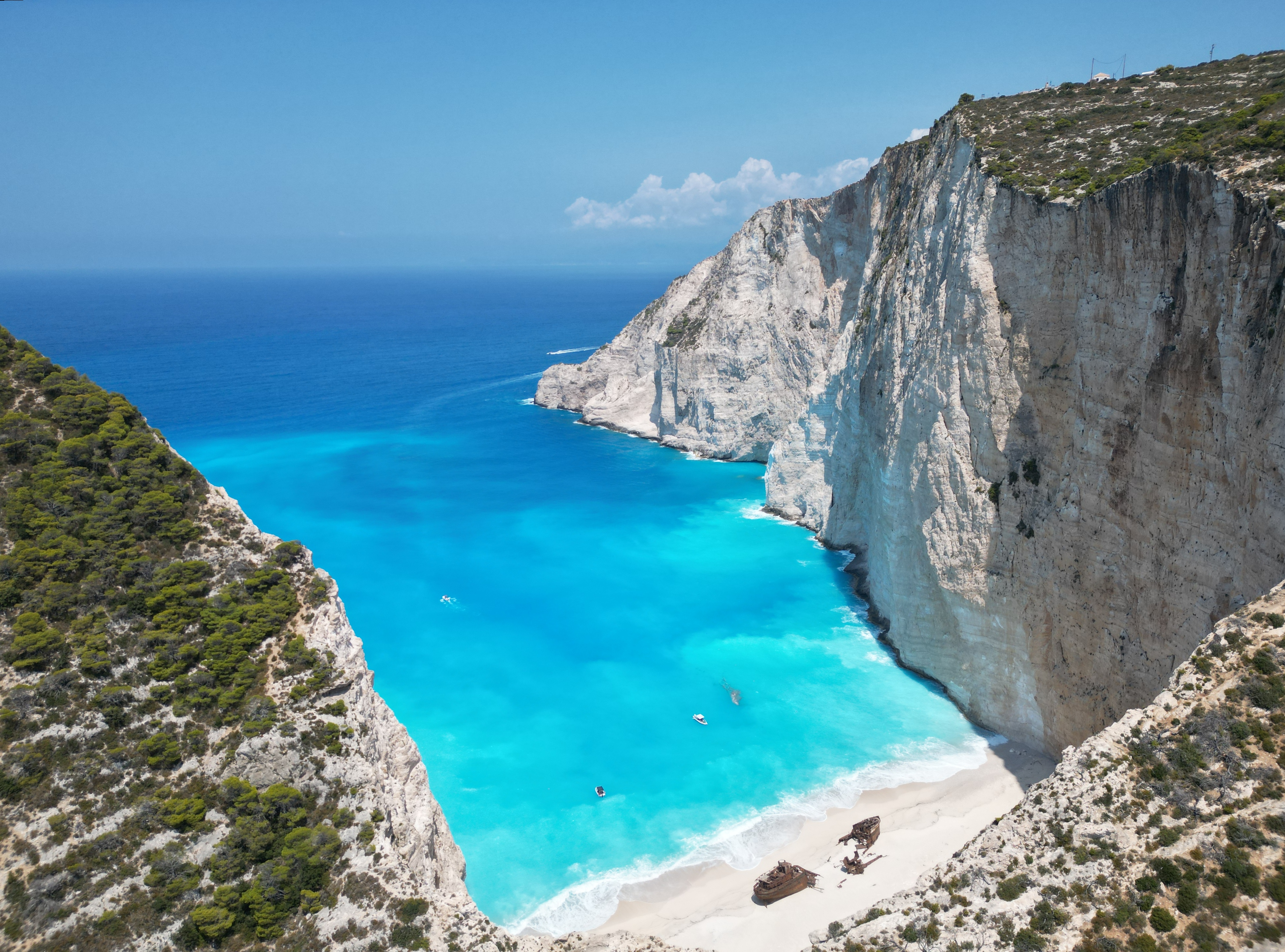

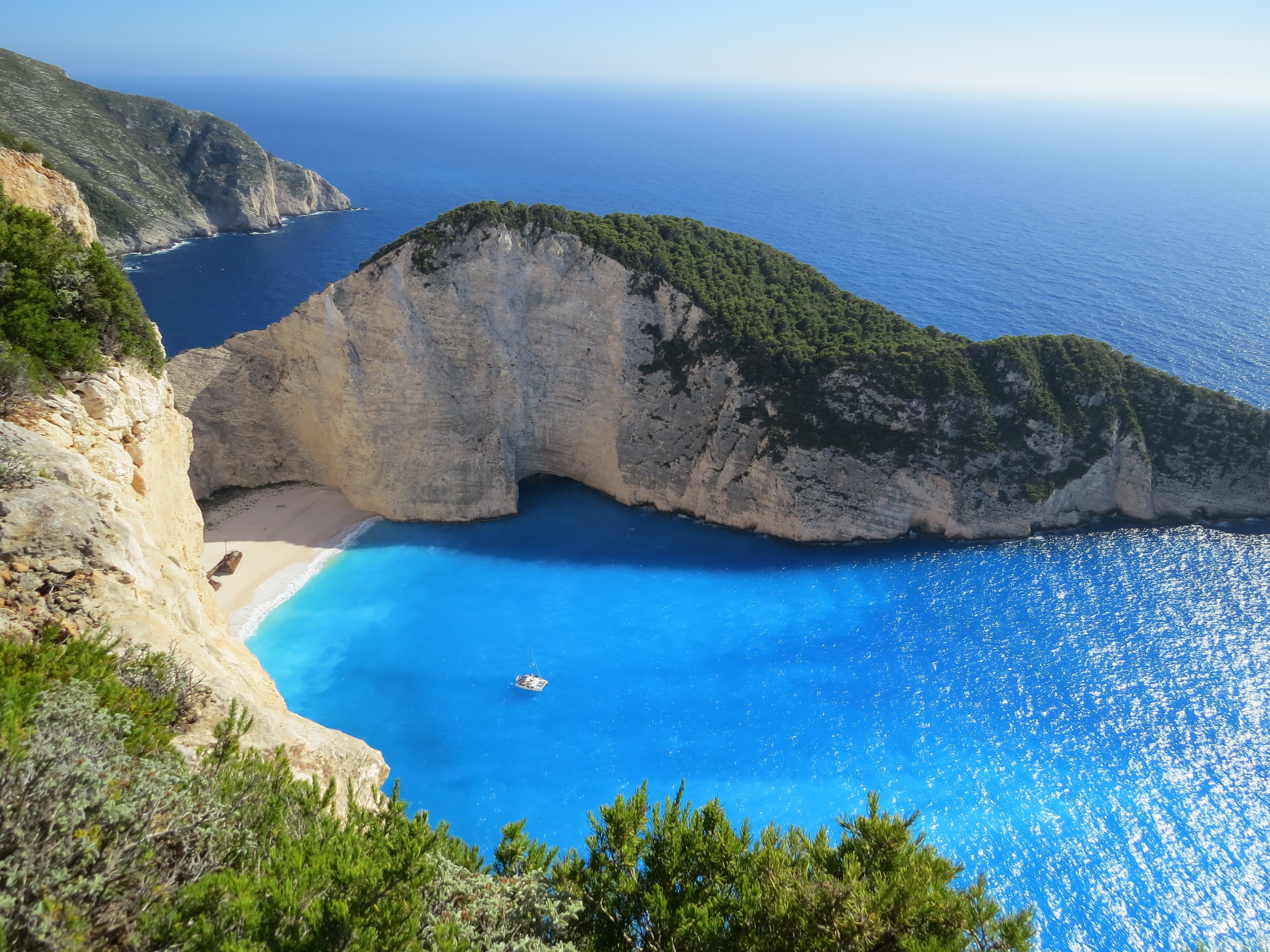

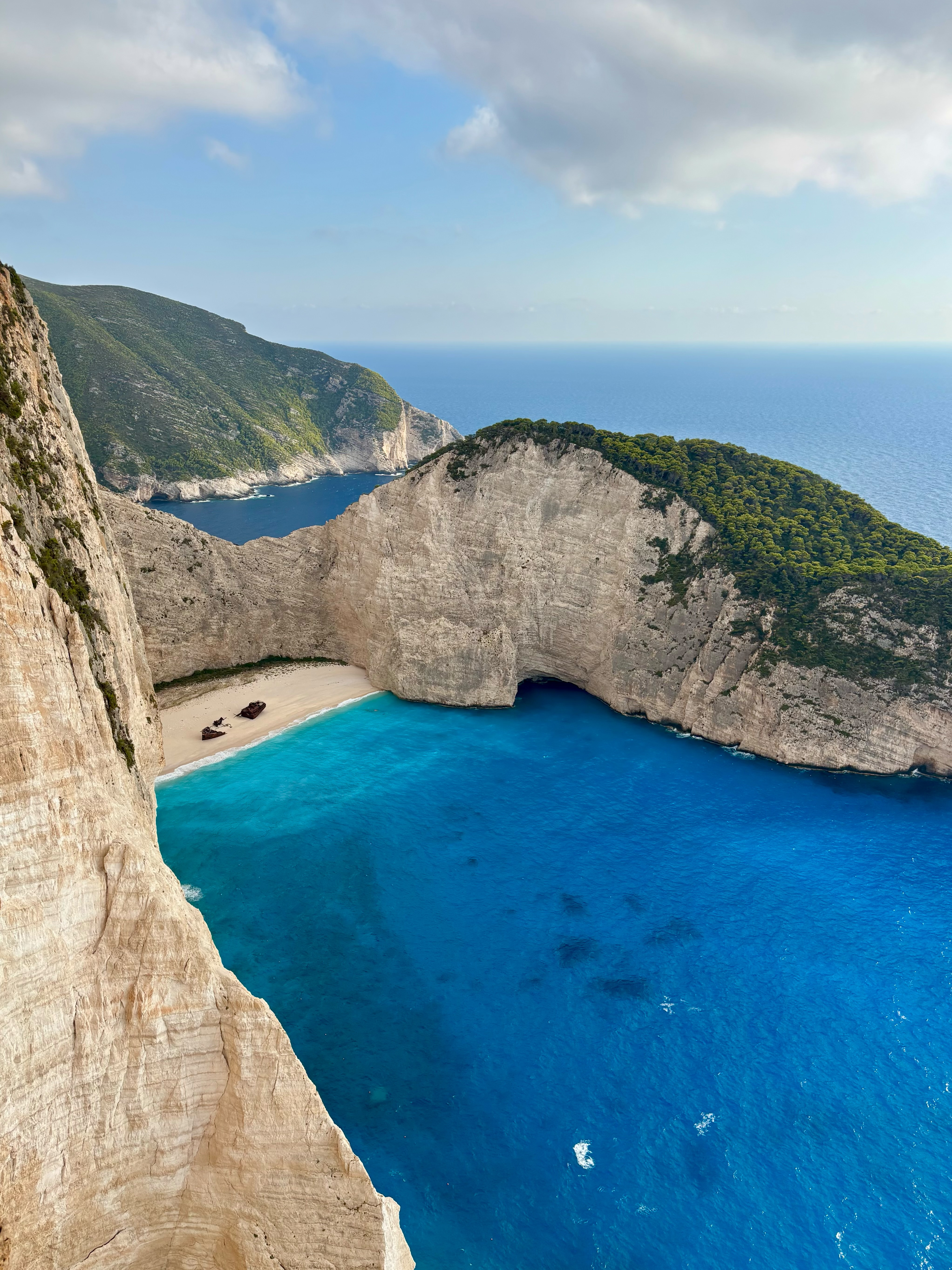

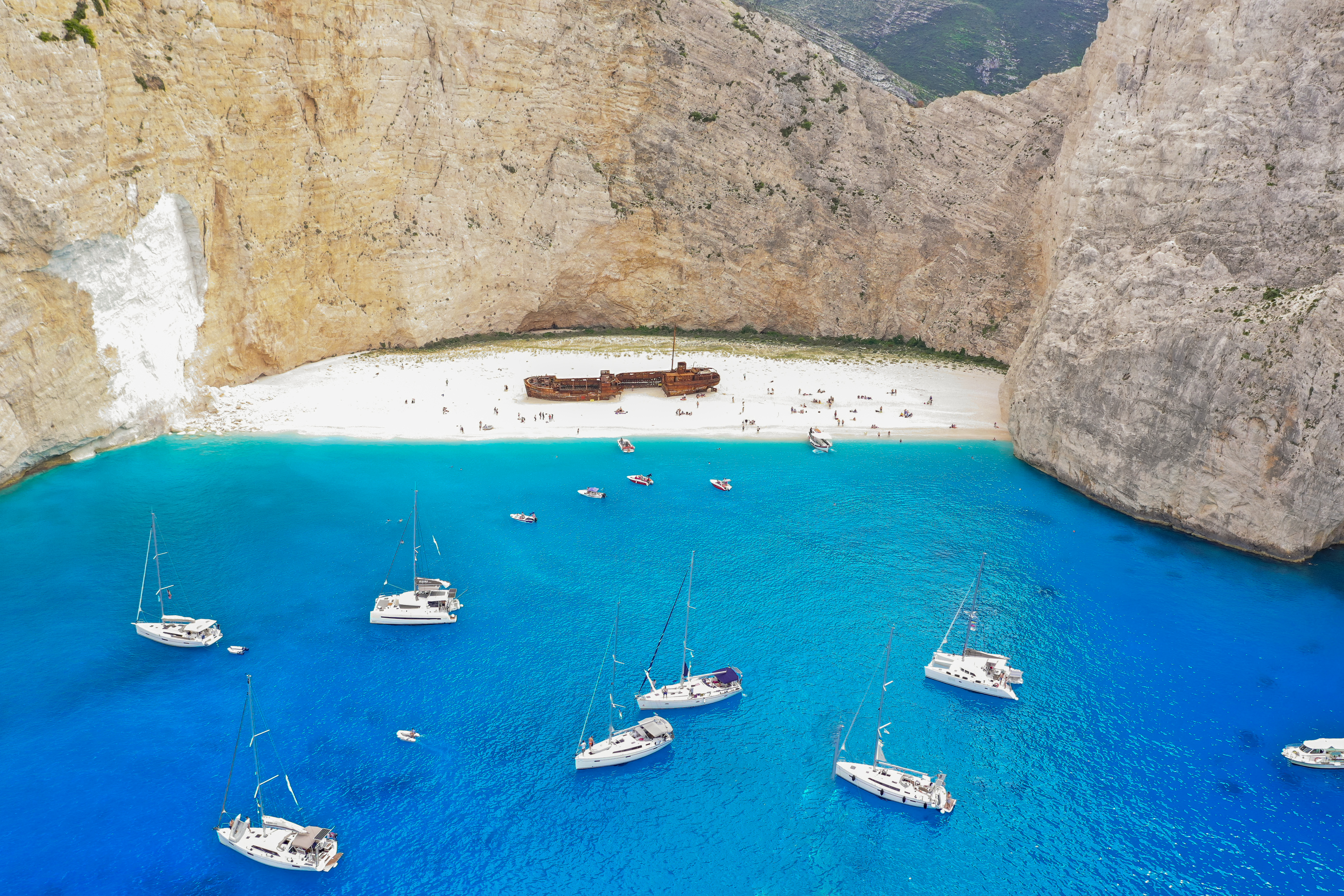

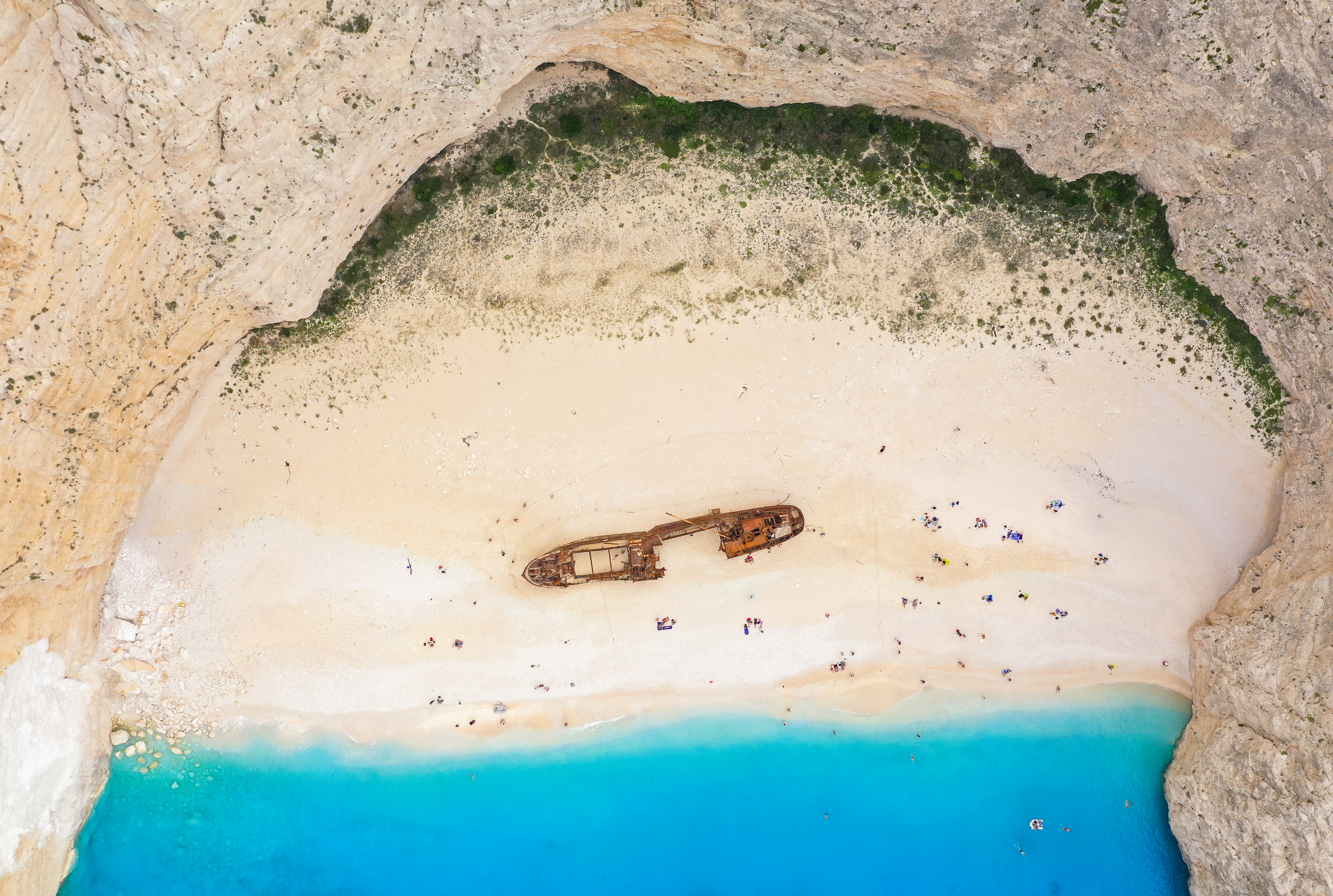

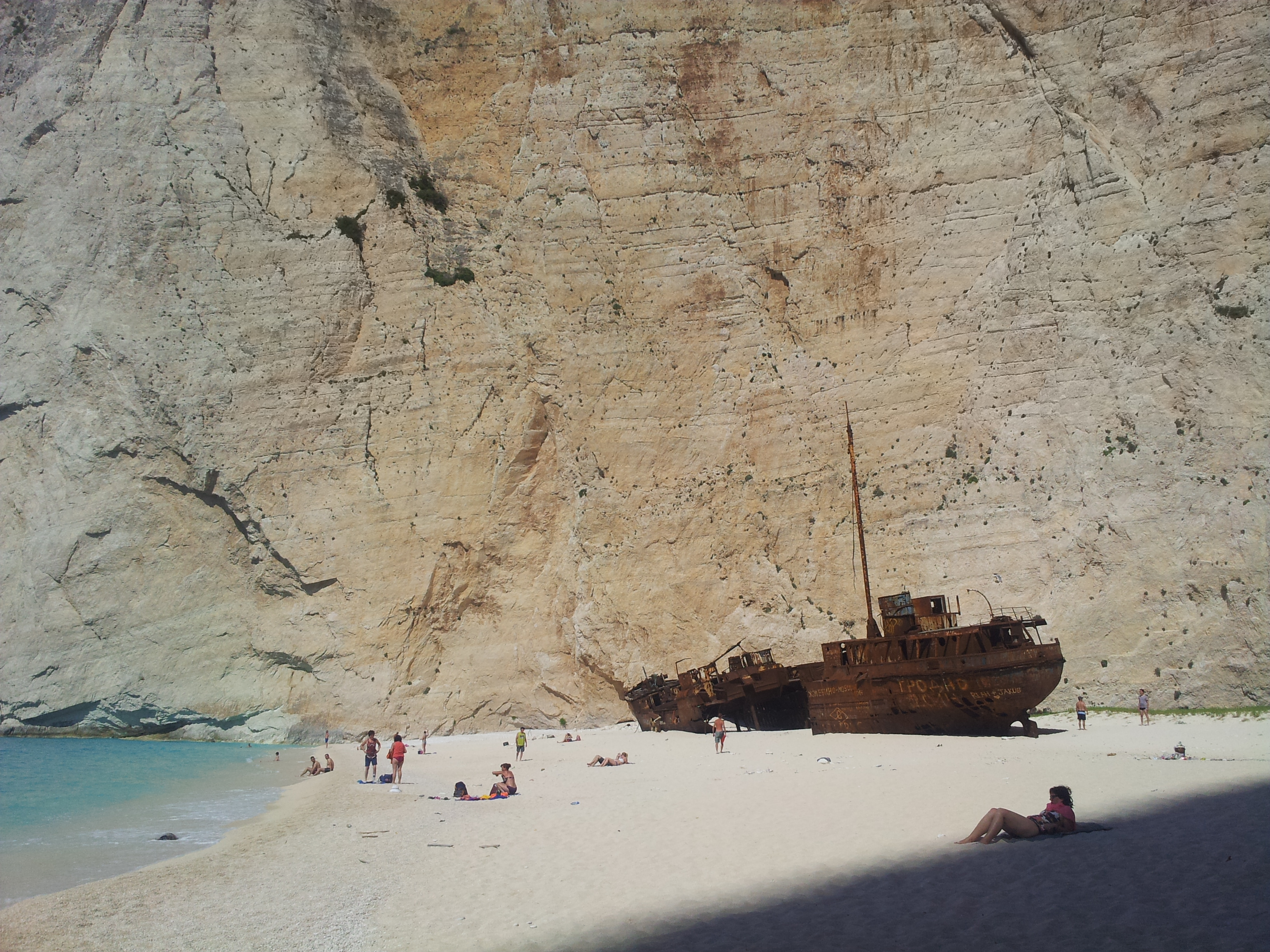

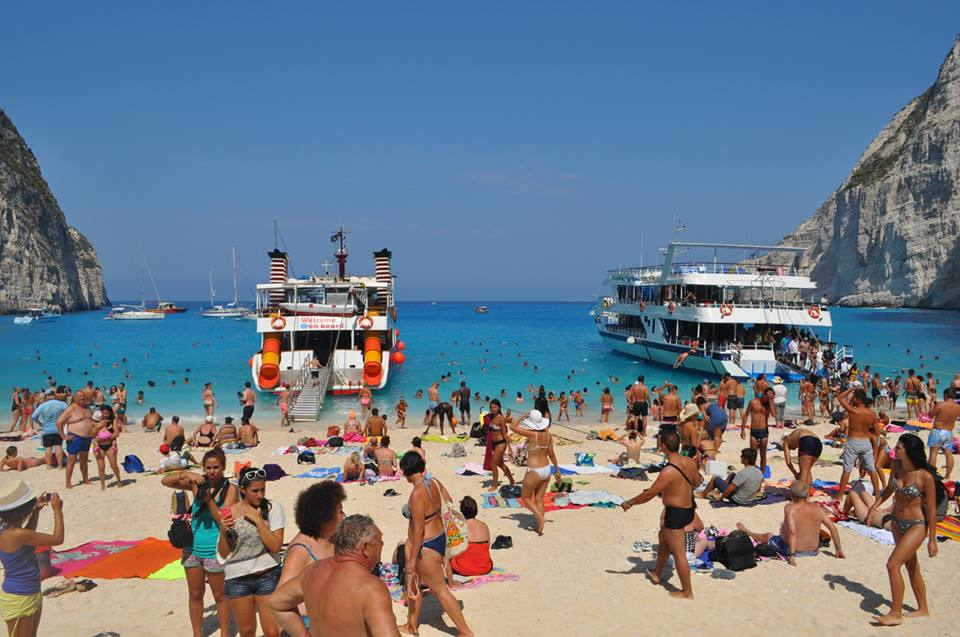
