= Kilcreggan =

Village in Argyll and Bute, Scotland

Coordinates: 55°59′05″N 4°49′49″W

Kilcreggan: Scottish Gaelic: Cille Chreagain
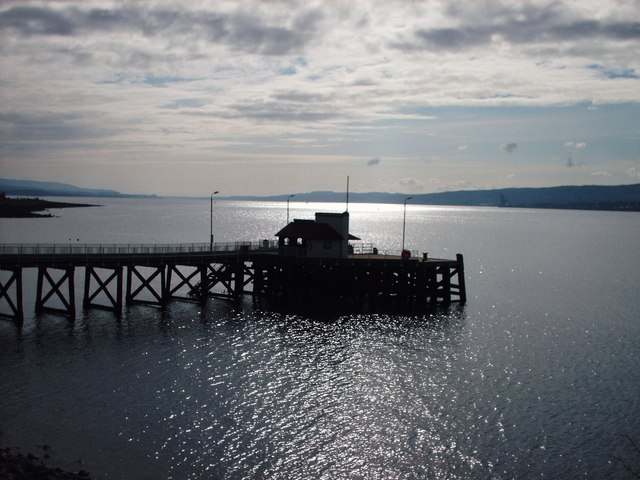
- Kilcreggan Pier

- Location within Argyll and Bute
- Population: 1,280 (2020)
- OS grid reference: NS 23800 80500
  - Edinburgh: 63 mi (101 km)
  - London: 364 mi (586 km)
- Council area: Argyll and Bute
- Lieutenancy area: Argyll and Bute
- Country: Scotland
- Sovereign state: United Kingdom
- Post town: Helensburgh
- Postcode district: G84
- Dialling code: 01436
- UK Parliament: Argyll, Bute and South Lochaber
- Scottish Parliament: Dumbarton

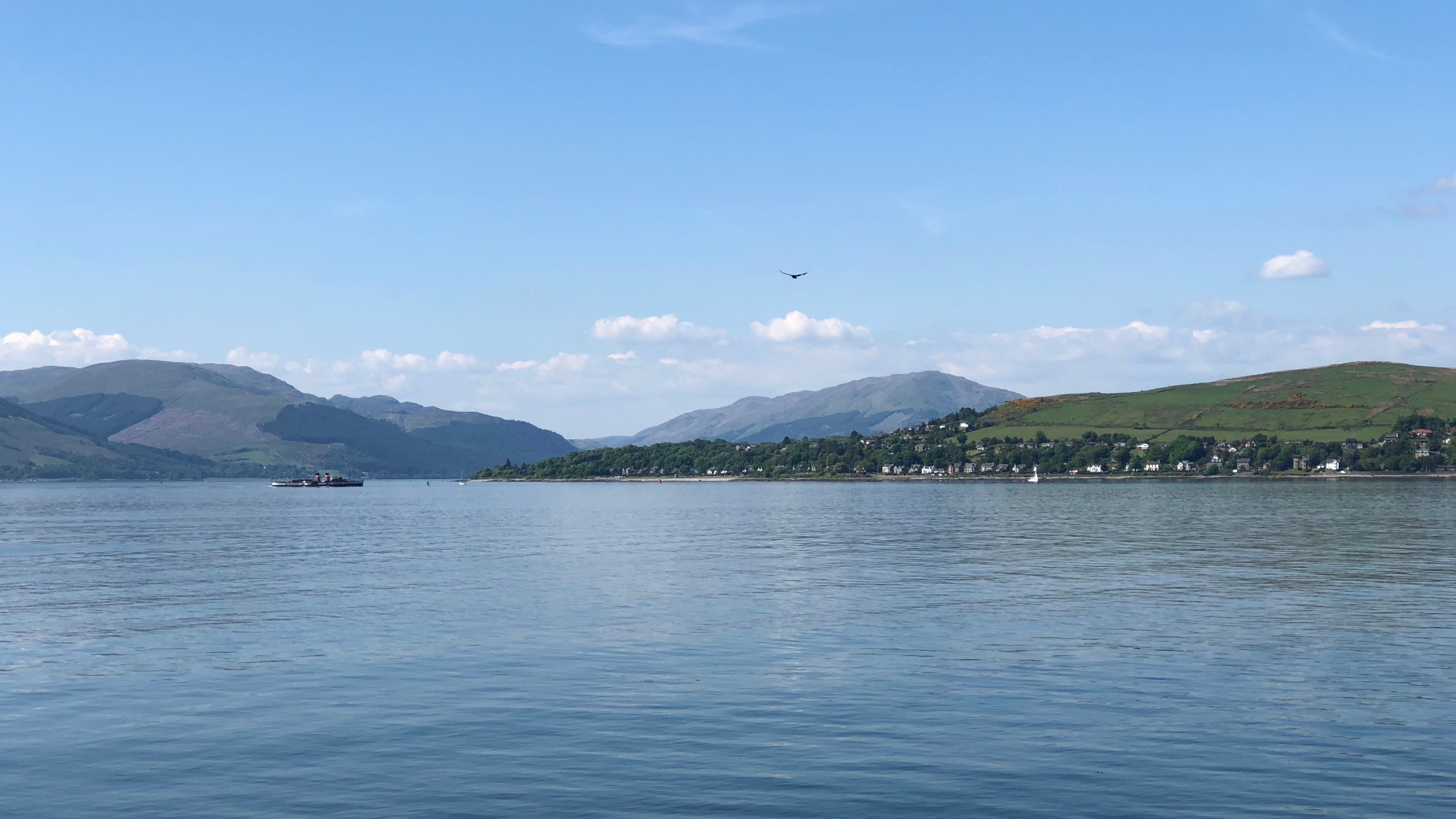
The Firth of Clyde at Kilcreggan, with PS Waverley approaching across Loch Long

Kilcreggan (Scottish Gaelic: Cille Chreagain) is a village on the Rosneath Peninsula in Argyll and Bute, West of Scotland.

It developed on the north shore of the Firth of Clyde at a time when Clyde steamers brought it within easy reach of Glasgow at about 25 miles (40 km) west of the centre of Glasgow by boat. Many Glasgow shipowners and merchants made their summer retreats or even permanent residences there, and this is reflected in some very grand houses along the shore. Not all have remained occupied; some were demolished and others have been converted into flats.

Its location at the end of the Rosneath peninsula, between the Gare Loch and Loch Long, makes the journey 38 miles (61 km) by road. The B833 minor road runs along the shore for the length of the village then cuts north inland just to the east of Kilcreggan pier rather than going east along the shore past Portkil Bay to Rosneath Point. About 2 miles (3 km) north of Kilcreggan the road reaches the village of Rosneath then continues north along the shores of the Gare Loch.

The majority of the houses look south across the Clyde towards the towns of Gourock and Greenock, and further down the firth towards the Isle of Arran.

Large attractive houses continue westwards from the pier towards Baron's Point, which marks the southern entrance to Loch Long, almost to the adjoining village of Cove which looks across Cove Bay towards Blairmore, only about 2 miles (3 km) distant, but separated by the deep waters of Loch Long. To the east of the pier, houses at Portkil extend down to Portkil Bay, and the 413-foot (126 m) hill at Rosneath home farm is topped by a television mast.

A ferry subsidised by Strathclyde Partnership for Transport provides a regular service from Kilcreggan pier across the Clyde to Gourock. Until 2012, the ferry service also included crossings of the Gare Loch to Helensburgh, and was operated by Clyde Marine Services which ran the elderly MV Kenilworth until 2007 when they introduced the new MV Seabus for the route. After re-tendering, the contract for the Gourock to Kilcreggan route was awarded by SPT to Clydelink which bought the smaller MV Island Princess for the run and commenced services on 1 April 2012. On 24 March 2012 more than 400 people protested at the pier over fears for the future of the service. The contract was taken away from Clydelink and returned to Clyde Marine, who resumed the Gourock to Kilcreggan ferry service on 14 May 2018 with the former Seabus, now in blue livery and renamed Chieftain. CalMac took over the contract from 1 June 2020, leasing Chieftain from Clyde Marine.

Kilcreggan is in the historic county of Dunbartonshire. Before the local government reorganisation in 1975 it formed part of the joint police burgh of Cove and Kilcreggan. It then formed part of Dumbarton District and Strathclyde Region until the reorganisation of the 1990s. It has been part of Argyll and Bute unitary authority since then.

Craigrownie Parish Church of Scotland serves the communities of Ardpeaton, Cove and Kilcreggan.

== Gallery ==
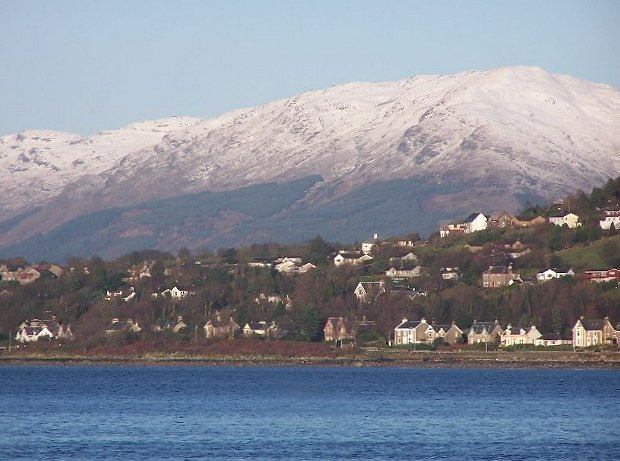
Houses in Kilcreggan west of the pier: the snowy hills in the background are on the other side of Loch Long.

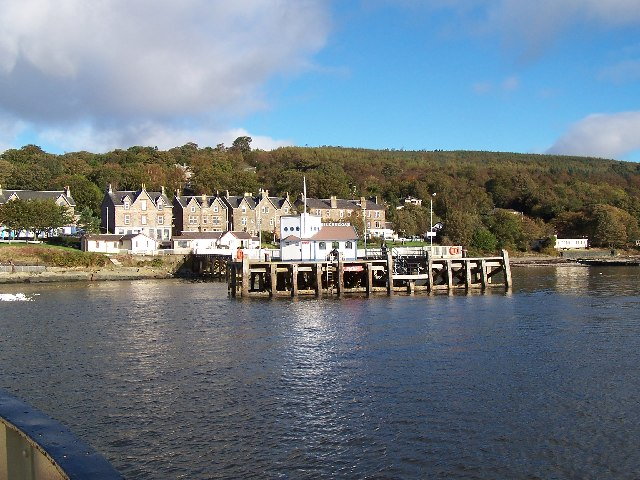
The pier formed the original focal point of the village.

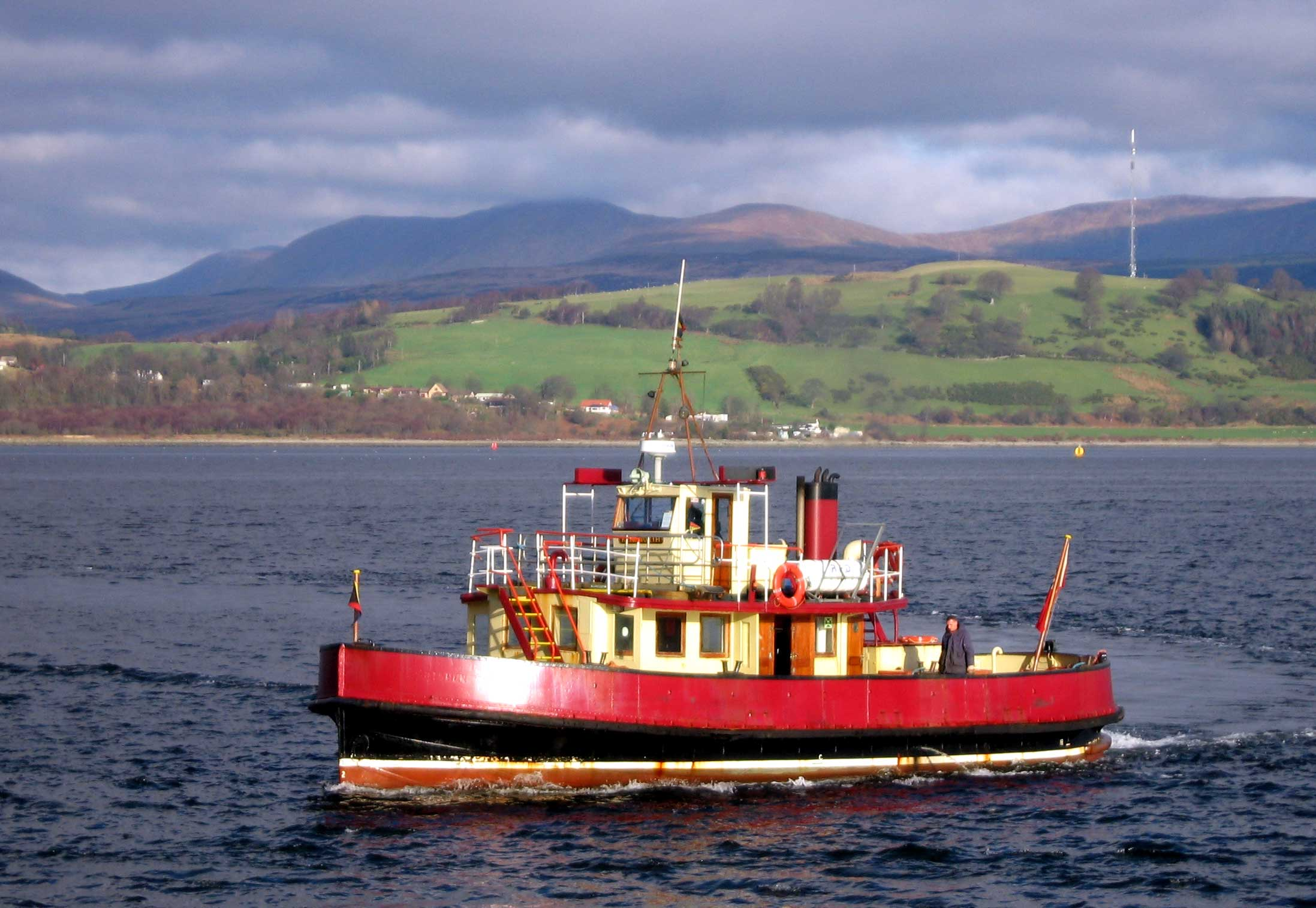
The Kenilworth seen in front of Portkil
