= List of public art in Glasgow =

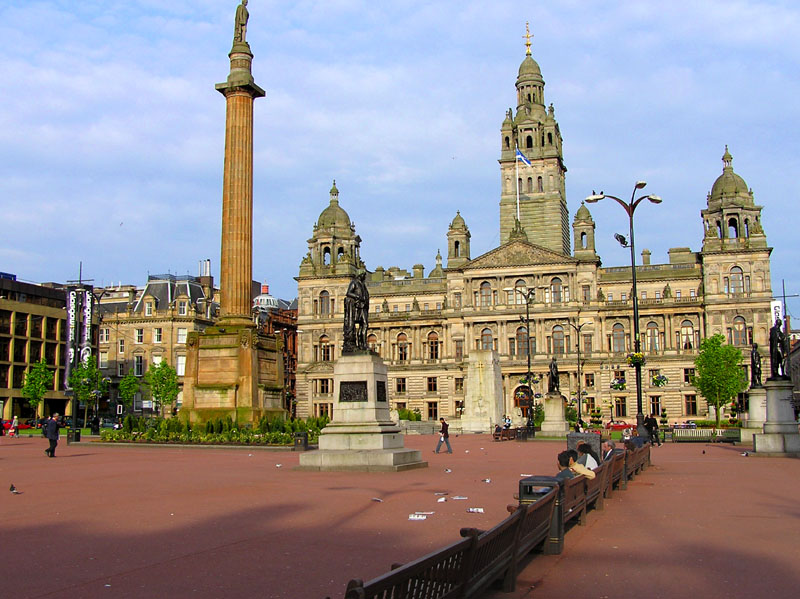
George Square contains a number of significant public statues and monuments.

Public statues in Glasgow, the largest city in Scotland, have been used to display its wealth and its history over centuries. The most prominent are those erected by the municipality or by public subscription, but others adorn the façades of the great commercial buildings.

== Cathedral Square ==
Image	Title / subject	Location and coordinates	Date	Artist / designer	Type	Material	Dimensions	Designation	Wikidata	Notes
More images	William II of Scotland (William of Orange)	Cathedral Square, Glasgow	1735	Unknown	Equestrian statue on pedestal	Bronze and stone		Category A	Q17567391	Statue first erected at Glasgow Cross in 1735, at the expense of James Macrae, a Governor of Madras, and was moved to its present site in 1923.
More images	James Lumsden	Cathedral Square, Glasgow	1862	John Mossman	Statue on pedestal	Bronze and pink granite		Category B	Q17811583	Lumsden was a stationer, local benefactor and Lord Provost of Glasgow from 1843 to 1846.
More images	David Livingstone	Cathedral Square, Glasgow	1879	John Mossman	Statue on pedestal	Bronze and granite		Category B	Q17811564	Originally erected in George Square. Re-erected across from Provand's Lordship in 1959. Re-erected in current location in 1990.
More images	Rev Dr Norman Macleod	Cathedral Square, Glasgow	1881	John Mossman	Statue on pedestal	Bronze and granite		Category B	Q17811590	Cast by Cox & Son.
More images	James White of Overtoun	Cathedral Square, Glasgow	1890	John Mossman, completed by Francis Leslie	Statue on pedestal	Bronze and granite		Category B	Q17811577	White was a solicitor, businessman and chemicals manufacturer.
	James Arthur	Cathedral Square, Glasgow	1893	George Anderson Lawson	Statue on pedestal	Bronze on granite		Category B	Q17811569	Arthur was a clothing manufacturer.

Other figures portrayed include St Paul, St Peter and the Four Evangelists on the facade of the Barony North (Glasgow Evangelical) Church to the east of the square – 1878-80 by McCulloch of London.

The nearby Glasgow Necropolis is a "garden" cemetery opened in 1833, in imitation of Père Lachaise Cemetery in Paris, has a number of statues associated with the funerary monuments of the rich and famous buried there. Most of these are private or religious statues, but the hilltop location is dominated by a large monument to John Knox erected in 1825. It consists of a 12 ft high statue of Knox, designed by Robert Forrest, atop a high Doric column by Thomas Hamilton.

== Charing Cross ==
Image	Title / subject	Location and coordinates	Date	Artist / designer	Type	Material	Dimensions	Designation	Wikidata	Notes
More images	Abstract mural (untitled)	Bath Lane	1972 (circa)	Keith McCarter	Relief mural	Concrete	260 × 2340cm		Q115755300	19, 130cm wide pre-cast concrete blocks, made in conjunction with R. Seifert Company and Partnership

== Custom House Quay ==
Image	Title / subject	Location and coordinates	Date	Artist / designer	Type	Material	Dimensions	Designation	Wikidata	Notes
More images	La Pasionaria, Dolores Ibárruri	Custom House Quay	1974-79	Arthur Dooley	Statue on pedestal	Iron and fibreglass		Category B		Commissioned by the International Brigade Association of Scotland.

== Elder Park ==
Image	Title / subject	Location and coordinates	Date	Artist / designer	Type	Material	Dimensions	Designation	Wikidata	Notes
More images	John Elder	Elder Park	1888	Sir Joseph Edgar Boehm	Statue on pedestal	Bronze and granite		Category B	Q17811104	
More images	Isabella Elder	Elder Park	1906	Archibald McFarlane Shannan	Seated statue on pedestal	Bronze and granite		Category A	Q17568709	Isabella Elder Statue cast by JW Singer & Sons, stonework by DH & J Newall of Dalbeattie.
	HMS K13 Submariners memorial	Elder Park	1922	Robert Gray	Obelisk	Granite				

== George Square ==
George Square is Glasgow's central public square and was laid out in 1782, with houses appearing between 1784 and 1820. Many of these later became hotels, especially after the opening of Queen Street Station. Only one of the original houses remains - the Millennium Hotel beside the station. The square is now a public space dominated by the City Chambers, the former Post Office building, ex-Bank of Scotland and the Merchant's House.

Image	Title / subject	Location and coordinates	Date	Artist / designer	Type	Material	Dimensions	Designation	Wikidata	Notes
More images	Statue of Sir John Moore	George Square	1819	John Flaxman	Statue on pedestal	Bronze and Aberdeen granite		Category A	Q17567464	The Statue of Sir John Moore was the first statue to be erected in George Square.
More images	James Watt	George Square	1832	Francis Leggatt Chantrey	Seated statue on pedestal	Bronze and Devonshire granite		Category A	Q17567460	Statue of James Watt (Glasgow)
More images	Scott Monument, Glasgow	George Square	1837	John Greenshields (statue); Alexander Handyside Ritchie (statue); David Rhind (column)	Statue on column and pedestal	Sandstone		Category A	Q43374173	The Walter Scott Memorial Column was the first ever statue to Sir Walter Scott.
More images	Queen Victoria	George Square	1854	Carlo Marochetti	Equestrian statue on pedestal	Bronze and granite		Category A	Q17567473	The Equestrian statue of Victoria (Glasgow) was the first equestrian statue of a woman in Britain.
More images	James Oswald	George Square	1855	Carlo Marochetti	Statue on pedestal	Bronze and granite		Category B	Q17792900	
More images	Sir Robert Peel	George Square	1859	John Mossman	Statue on pedestal	Bronze and granite		Category B	Q17792945	
More images	Albert, Prince Consort	George Square	1866	Carlo Marochetti	Equestrian statue on pedestal	Bronze and granite		Category A	Q17567468	Equestrian statue of Albert, Prince Consort (Glasgow)
More images	Colin Campbell, 1st Baron Clyde	George Square	1867	John Henry Foley	Statue on pedestal	Bronze and granite		Category B	Q17792870	
More images	Thomas Graham	George Square	1871	William Brodie	Seated statue on pedestal	Bronze and granite		Category B	Q17792967	
More images	Robert Burns	George Square	1877	George Edwin Ewing; James Alexander Ewing; James Alexander Ewing	Statue on pedestal	Bronze and granite		Category B	Q17792930	Cast by Cox and Son.
More images	Thomas Campbell	George Square	1877	John Mossman	Statue on pedestal	Bronze and granite		Category B	Q17792852	
More images	William Ewart Gladstone	George Square	1902	Hamo Thornycroft	Statue on pedestal	Bronze and granite		Category B	Q17792886	Originally erected in front of Glasgow City Chambers, it was relocated to the north side of George Square in 1923 to accommodate the Cenotaph.
More images	Glasgow War Memorial	George Square	1924	Ernest Gillick (sculptor); John James Burnet (architect)	Cenotaph, surround, two statues of recumbent lions	Bronze and Portland stone		Category B	Q17792838	

== Glasgow Harbour ==
Image	Title / subject	Location and coordinates	Date	Artist / designer	Type	Material	Dimensions	Designation	Wikidata	Notes
More images	The Rise	Glasgow Harbour	2008	Andy Scott	Sculpture	Galvanised steel	6m high			

== Gordon Street ==
Image	Title / subject	Location and coordinates	Date	Artist / designer	Type	Material	Dimensions	Designation	Wikidata	Notes
More images	Citizen Firefighter	Gordon Street	2001	Kenny Hunter	Statue	Bronze				Commissioned by the Strathclyde Fire Brigade, three months after it was unveiled (on 17 June 2001) the statue became a focal point for tributes to the firefighters who died in and after the September 11 attacks.

== Ingram Street ==
Image	Title / subject	Location and coordinates	Date	Artist / designer	Type	Material	Dimensions	Designation	Wikidata	Notes
	George Hutcheson	Former Hutchesons' Hospital, Ingram Street	1649	James Colquhoun	Statue in alcove	Stone		Category A		

Also on Ingram Street is the Italian Centre displaying rather classical looking modern statues by Alexander Stoddart. Inside the centre a distinctively modern man is rather amusingly struck by the same object of interest as his dog.

== Kelvingrove Park ==
Image	Title / subject	Location and coordinates	Date	Artist / designer	Type	Material	Dimensions	Designation	Wikidata	Notes
More images	Stewart Memorial Fountain	Kelvingrove Park	1872	James Sellers (architect), John Mossman (sculptor).	Fountain	Sandstone, marble & granite		Category A	Q17576744	
More images	Saint Mungo as the Patron of Art and Music	Kelvingrove Art Gallery and Museum	1901	George Frampton	Sculpture group	Bronze		Category A		
More images	South African War Memorial	Kelvingrove Park	1906	William Birnie Rhind	Statue on pedestal	Bronze and stone		Category B	Q17811618	
More images	Lord Kelvin	Kelvingrove Park	1913	Archibald Macfarlane Shannan	Seated statue on pedestal	Bronze and granite		Category B	Q17799924	
More images	Frederick Roberts, 1st Earl Roberts	Kelvingrove Park	1916	Henry Poole after an original by Harry Bates	Equestrian statue on pedestal	Bronze and stone		Category A	Q17576740	Roberts Memorial
	Thomas Carlyle	Kelvingrove Park	1916	William Kellock Brown	Sculpture	Stone				
More images	Cameronians War Memorial	Kelvingrove Park	1924	Philip Lindsey Clark	Statue group on pedestal	Bronze and granite		Category B	Q17806647	
	The Psalmist	Honeyman Memorial Garden, Kelvingrove Park	1972	Benno Schotz	Sculpture	Bronze				

== Partick Interchange ==
Image	Title / subject	Location and coordinates	Date	Artist / designer	Type	Material	Dimensions	Designation	Wikidata	Notes
	G.I. Bride	Partick station	2011	Ranald MacColl	Statue	Bronze resin				Bud Neill's G.I. Bride character from the Lobey Dosser series is depicted with her baby Ned, forever trying to thumb a lift from Calton Creek in Arizona back to Partick.

== Royal Exchange Square ==
Image	Title / subject	Location and coordinates	Date	Artist / designer	Type	Material	Dimensions	Designation	Wikidata	Notes
More images	Duke of Wellington monument	Royal Exchange Square	1844	Carlo Marochetti	Equestrian statue on pedestal	Bronze and Peterhead granite		Category A	Q7981506	Capping the statue with a traffic cone has become a traditional practice in the city but due to minor damage to the statue and the potential for injury, the practice has been discouraged by Glasgow City Council and Strathclyde Police.

== Springburn Park ==
Image	Title / subject	Location and coordinates	Date	Artist / designer	Type	Material	Dimensions	Designation	Wikidata	Notes
More images	Unicorn & column	Springburn Park	Late 19th century		Sculpture on column	Terracotta		Category B	Q17811040	
More images	James Reid (1823–1894)	Springburn Park	1903	Goscombe John	Statue on pedestal	Bronze and granite		Category B	Q17811051	

== Victoria Park ==
Image	Title / subject	Location and coordinates	Date	Artist / designer	Type	Material	Dimensions	Designation	Wikidata	Notes
	Partick & Whiteinch war memorial	Victoria Park	1922	Francis William Doyle Jones	Statue on obelisk	Bronze and stone	8m tall	Category C	Q77782061	

== Woodlands Road ==
Image	Title / subject	Location and coordinates	Date	Artist / designer	Type	Material	Dimensions	Designation	Wikidata	Notes
More images	Lobey Dosser	Woodlands Road	1992	Ranald MacColl (designer), Tony Morrow & Nick Gillion (sculptors)	Statue	Bronze				Statue of cartoon characters created by Bud Neill. The statue depicts Lobey Dosser, the Sheriff of Calton Creek, taking in his handcuffed arch-enemy Rank Bajin, on his horse El Fideldo (Elfie) which only has two legs. Claimed to be the only two-legged equestrian statue in the world.

== Bibliography ==
- McKenzie, R., Sculpture in Glasgow:an illustrated handbook Glasgow The Foulis Archive Press 1999 ISBN 0-9537149-0-X.
- Williamson, E., Riches, A., and Higgs, M., The Buildings of Scotland: Glasgow Penguin Books London 1990 ISBN 0-300-09674-7.
