= George Square =

Civic square in Glasgow, Scotland

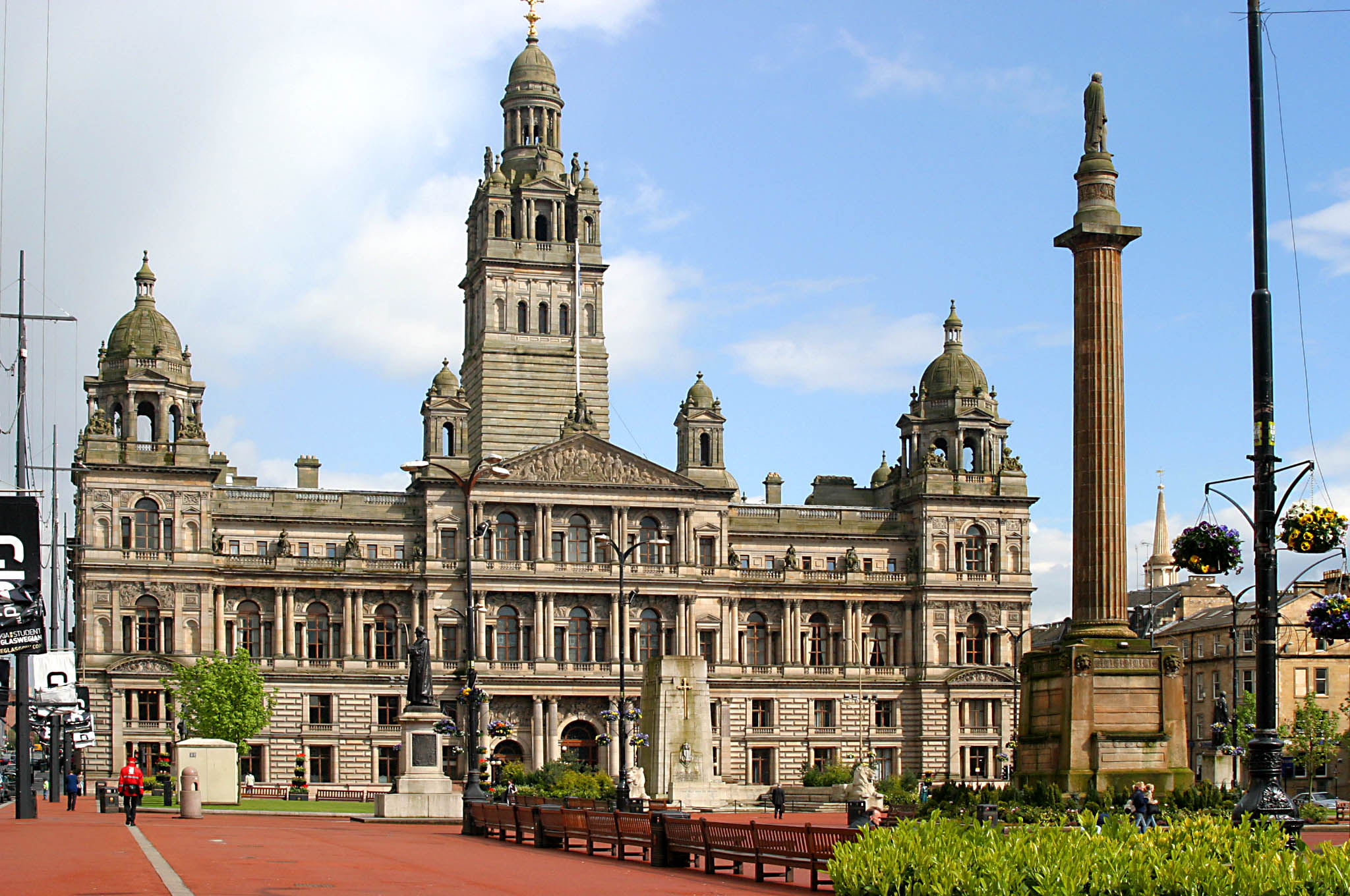
- George Square with the Scott monument in the centre, Glasgow City Chambers to the left and the former General Post Office to the right
- Interactive map of George Square
- Namesake: George III
- Location: Glasgow, Scotland, UK
- Coordinates: 55°51′40″N 04°15′01″W

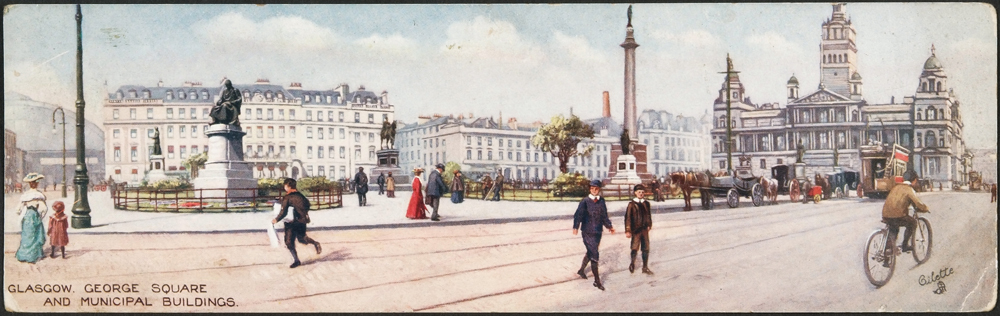
Panorama postcard from south-west corner showing the square as of 1905

George Square (Scottish Gaelic: Ceàrnag Sheòrais) is the principal civic square in the city of Glasgow, Scotland. It is one of six squares in the city centre, the others being Cathedral Square, St Andrew's Square, St Enoch Square, Royal Exchange Square, and Blythswood Square on Blythswood Hill.

Named after King George III and initially laid out in 1781 but not developed for another twenty years, George Square is surrounded by architecturally important buildings including on the east side the palatial City Chambers, whose foundation stone was laid in 1883, and on the west side by the Merchants' House. Built by Glasgow Corporation, the Chambers are the headquarters of Glasgow City Council. Joseph Swan's panoramic engraving of 1829 shows the early development of the square and its surrounding buildings.

The Square has undergone significant remodelling in recent times. First in 2012 for the 2014 Commonwealth Games, and again in 2024. The square was slated to reopen in August 2026.

The square boasts an important collection of statues and monuments, including those dedicated to Robert Burns, James Watt, Sir Robert Peel and Sir Walter Scott.

== Historical development ==
Medieval Glasgow had a large area of common pasture to the west and north of the city. Every day, the town herd took the cattle of the burghers along an unpaved road called Cow Lone which led from the Trongate's West Port to pasture on the common, then on to Cowcaddens where the cattle were milked in the evening before returning. Long narrow back gardens or riggs ran north from Trongate properties, forming the Langcroft area, and along its northern boundary Back Cow Lone provided an alternative route west from the High Street. Cow Lone ran north between the Meadowflat lands (to the west) and the Ramshorn croft, which was bounded to the north by Rottenrow lane, and on the east by Deanside Brae, down via Greyfriar's Wynd (Shuttle Street) to Candleriggs. These lands became George Hutcheson's property in 1609. Hutcheson's Hospital tried to lease areas to small crofts or gardeners but the ground was poor. In 1772 the city magistrates bought the lands of Ramshorn and Meadowflats.

From 1750 wealth from tobacco, sugar and cotton brought rapid expansion westwards, with new streets laid out along the riggs, including, starting at Argyle Street, Virginia Street in 1753 and Miller Street in 1762. Cow Lone, impassible in wet weather, was renamed Queen street after Queen Charlotte in 1766, and paved as far as the junction with Back Cow Lone, which in 1772 was straightened and renamed Ingram Street. In that year the town's surveyor, James Barrie (or Barry), produced a grid plan for the Ramshorn lands, similar to planned development in London and Craig's 1766 gridded plan for Edinburgh's New Town. Barrie produced another plan in 1781, and in 1782 Glasgow's council adopted a grid incorporating a large square. This provided "a regular plan to the line of the streets in which every purchaser was bound to keep", later extended over Meadowflats. In 1782 a house for two families was built in George Square, then there was a four-year pause before rapid growth began. Directly in line with the projected extension of Queen Street, a large mansion was built around 1783 in grounds just south of Rottenrow lane as Bailie George Crawford's Lodging, later known as Glasgow House.

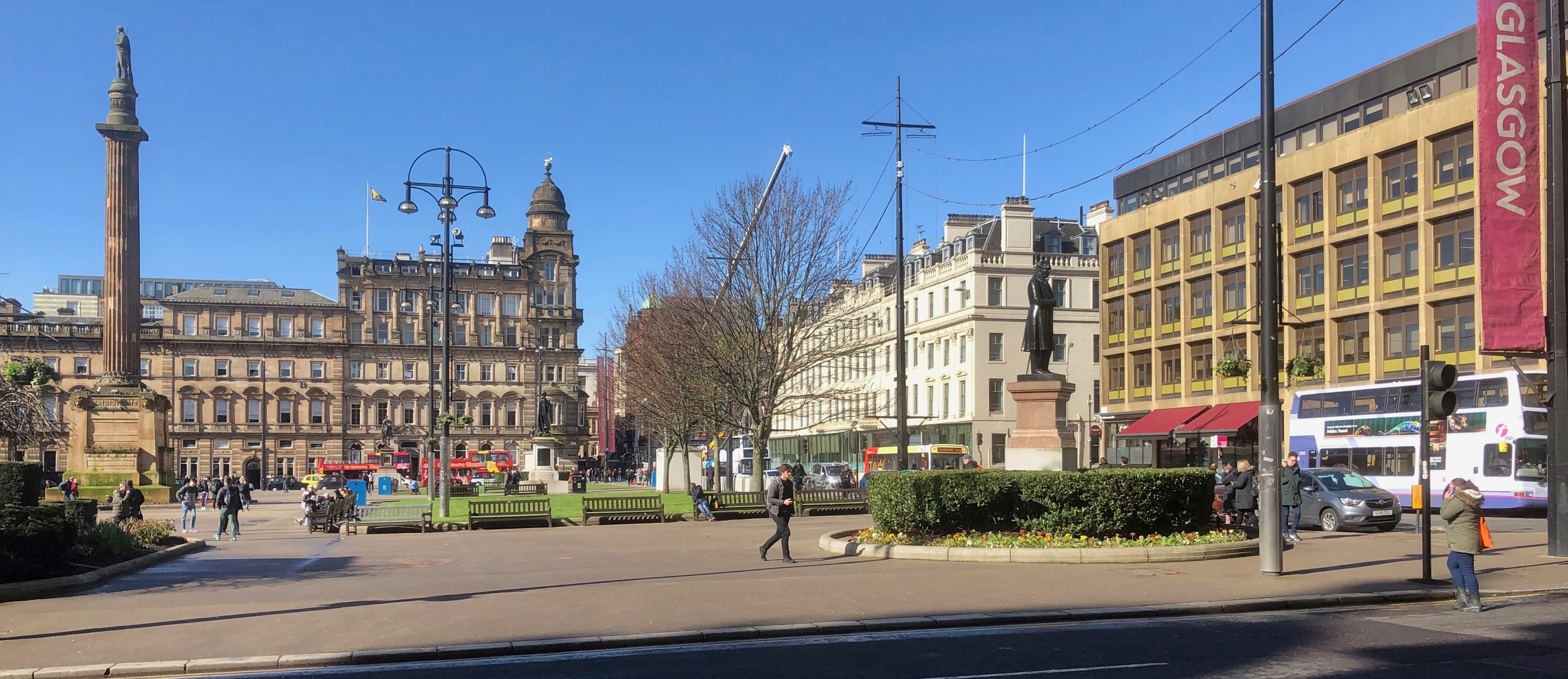
Scott monument of 1837; to the right of centre, the three-storey townhouses of 1807–1818 became the North British Hotel, and had a storey added in 1905.

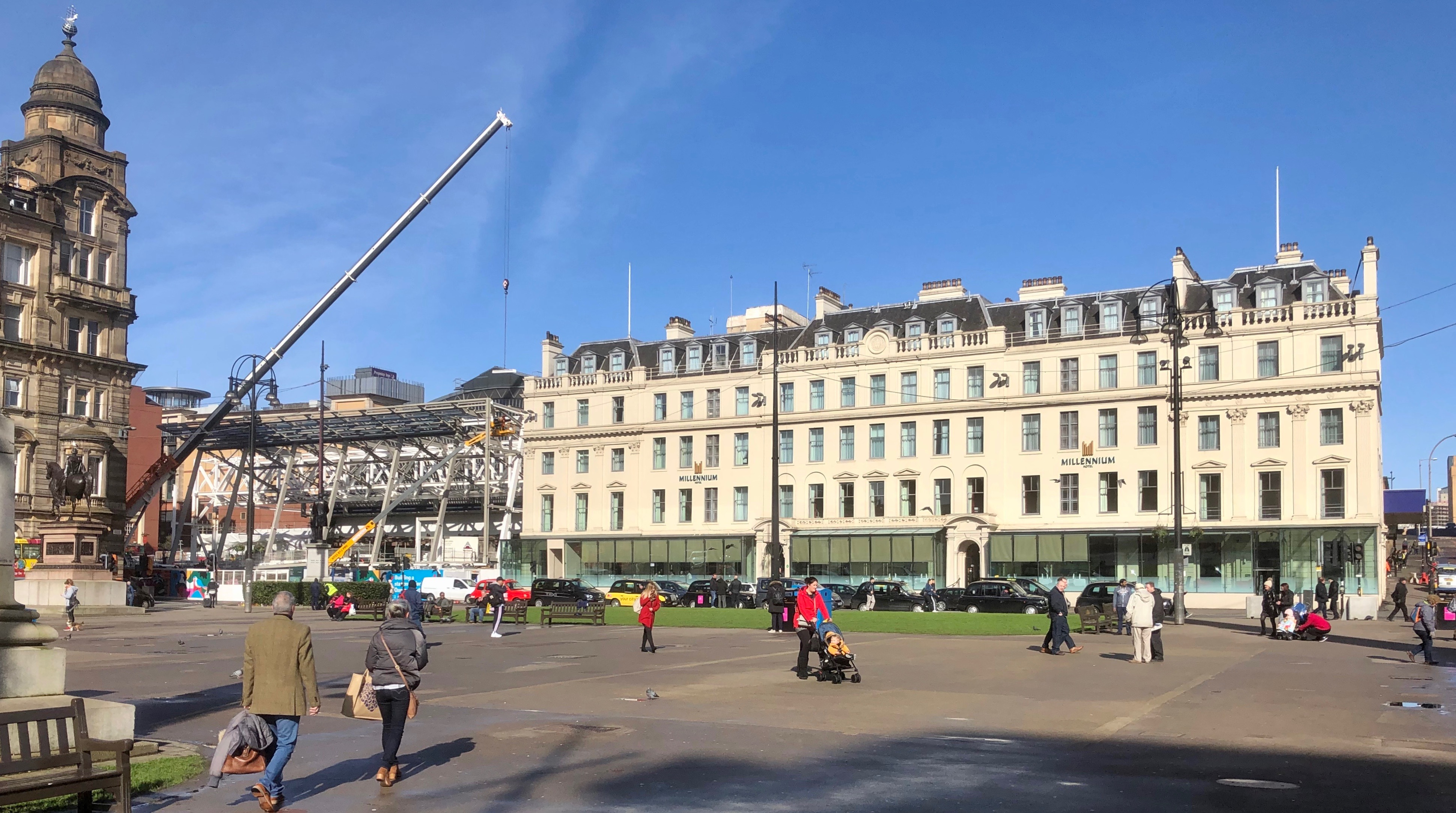
Entrance to Queen Street Station, and the North British Hotel, now renamed the Millennium Hotel.

George's square, as it was known initially, was named after King George III. New streets named after royalty included Hanover street and Frederick street. Around 1790 the developments north of Trongate became known as Glasgow's New Town (in post-1980 regeneration this general area was rebranded as the Merchant City).

Between 1787 and the 1820s Georgian terraces were built around the perimeter of George's square. The west side (in line with Queen Street) was a three-storey high block of six tenements, which had three entrances with passageways to turnpike stairs at the back for the upper flats. These "plain dwellings" were "the residences of many most respectable families", but were criticised as looking like soldier's barracks or a cotton mill. The east side was a two-storey high terrace of "comfortable dwelling-houses with a double flight of steps to the second storey". By 1807 a hotel occupied the south end of this terrace, it later became the George Hotel. On the south and north sides, terraces of large townhouses had three storeys above a basement lit by a sunken area fenced off from the pavement. As Glasgow historian James Denholm wrote of "George's square" in 1804, "The buildings here are very elegant, particularly those upon the north; which, from the beauty of the design, and taste displayed in the execution, surpass by far any other either in this city or in Scotland." The north side was completed 1807–1818 with three imposing townhouses built between Queen Street and Hanover Street.

James Ewing of Strathleven bought Glasgow House in 1815, its grounds became known as the "Queen Street Park". Crows nested in tall trees around his mansion, and he was nicknamed "Craw Ewing". The centre of George Square had been used as a tip for surplus soil and debris around a stagnant pool, it was enclosed with a paling fence and used for grazing sheep. The first statue, erected in 1819 on the south of the square facing Miller Street, commemorated Sir John Moore of Corunna.

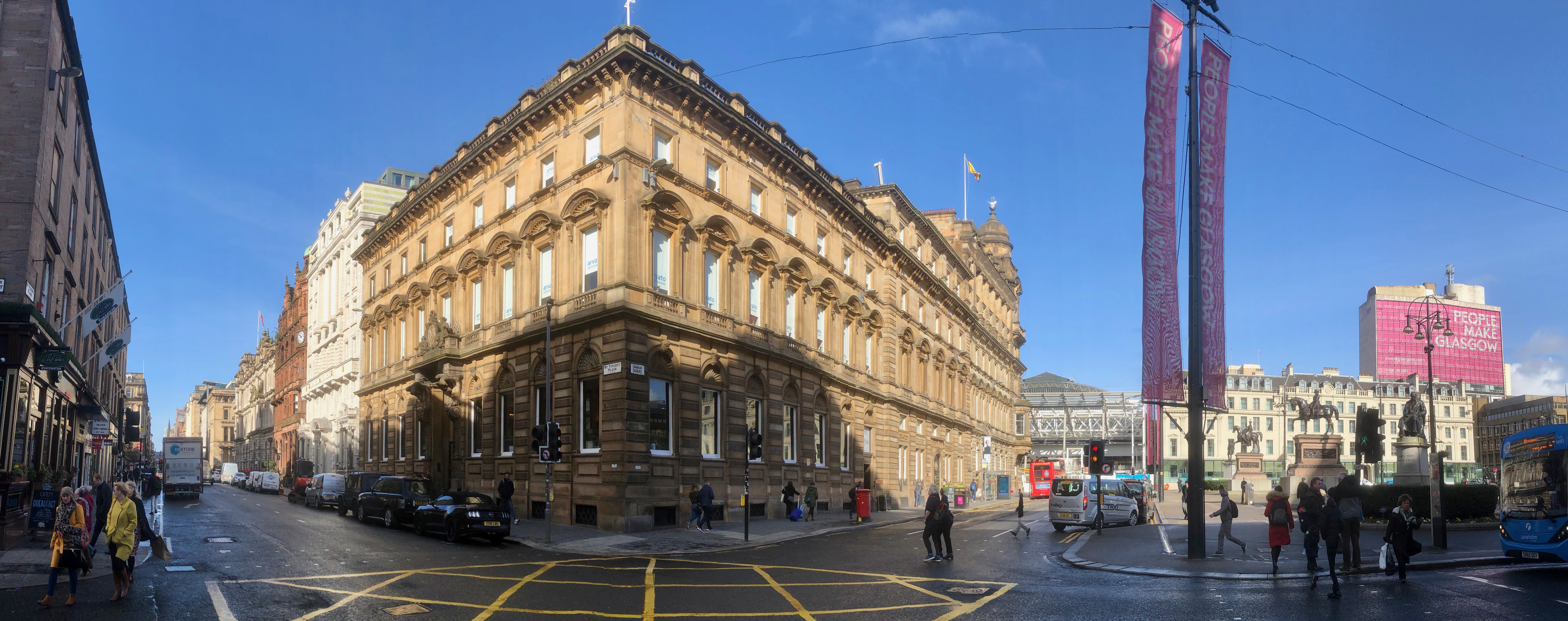
Bank of Scotland 1867–1870 on corner of St Vincent Place, Queen Street station roof of 1880.

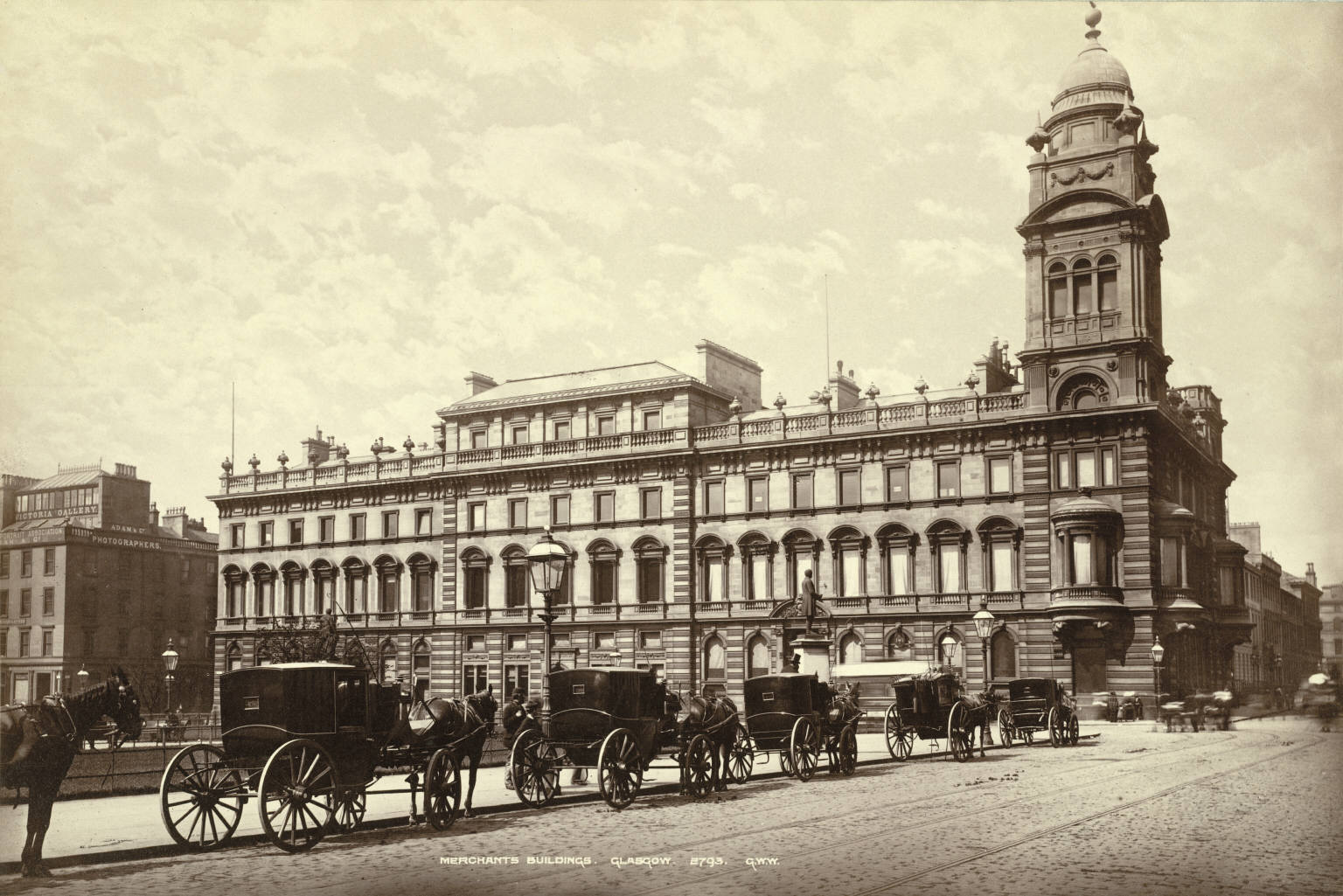
Bank of Scotland theme continued in extension 1874–1876, and Merchants' House 1874–1880.

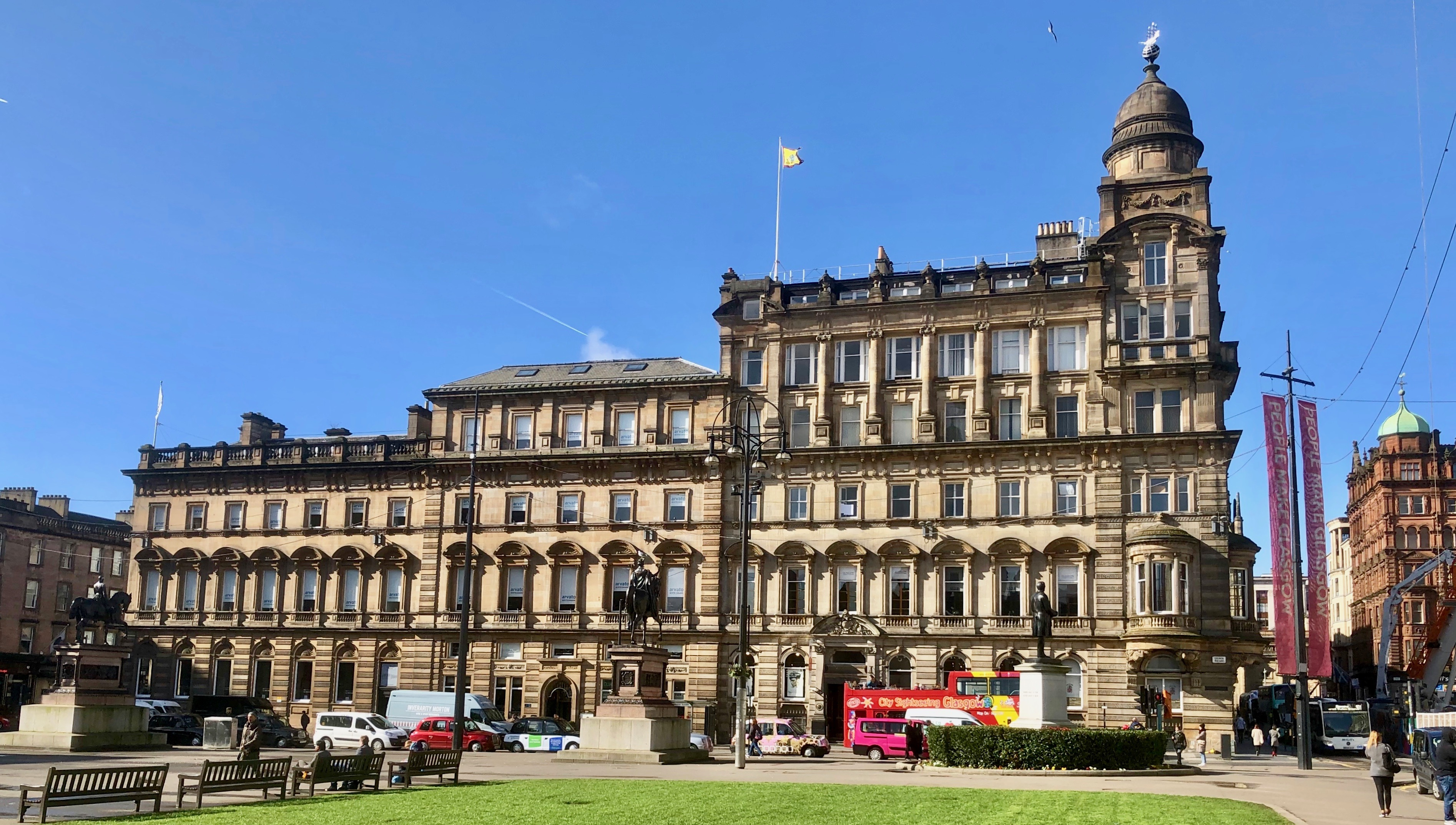
Two storeys added to Merchants' House 1907–1909, further unbalancing the symmetry.

In 1825 the Corporation instructed Stewart Murray, the curator and landscape architect of the Royal Botanic Gardens in Sandyford, to improve the square. He landscaped it with winding walks, trees and shrubs, fenced around with an iron railing. Flower shows were organised, held in tents. The centre spot was used to commemorate Sir Walter Scott with the first ever monument dedicated to him. The 80 foot fluted Doric column of Giffnock "liver rock" sandstone was designed by the competition winning architect David Rhind, who appointed John Greenshields to design the statue above, which was executed by John Ritchie. The monument was completed by 1837, some years before Scott was commemorated in Edinburgh.

From March to July 1834 the Steam Carriage Company of Scotland ran an hourly service to Paisley from its terminus at the northeast corner of the square. In 1838 James Ewing sold Glasgow House to the Edinburgh and Glasgow Railway, who demolished it and built their terminus in its grounds, with station buildings in Dundas Street. It opened in 1842, and was later named the Queen Street Station, with its main entrance a direct continuation of Queen Street. Several nearby houses were soon converted into accommodation for travellers. The Glasgow and Edinburgh Chop House and Commercial Lodgings, on the west side of the square, was taken over by George Cranston shortly before his daughter Kate Cranston was born in 1849. It was renamed the Edinburgh and Glasgow Hotel, and subsequently known as Cranston's Hotel. Around 1855 town houses on the north side of the square to were converted into The Royal, The Crown and The Queen's Hotel. The Cranstons, seeking to enlarge their premises, moved about 1860 into the Crow Hotel, third from the south end. Around 1866, after the two tenements at the south end were demolished, the Cranstons moved to the Crown Hotel on the north side of the square.

Along the south side, terraces came into new uses or new buildings erected, including business use, manufacturing and tenements. Around 1863 Henry Monteith & Co. had Italian Renaissance-style offices built, probably designed by John Burnet.

In 1865 the two southern tenements on the west side were demolished, and the Bank of Scotland's Italianate building designed by John Thomas Rochead was built in their place 1867–1870, followed in 1874–1876 by a matching extension taking up the central third of the block. The bank's elevation was reflected in the Merchants' House (1875–1880), but symmetry was unbalanced by its corner tower, and the later addition of two more storeys.

Glasgow Corporation took over the management of George Square in 1862. When the Post Office foundation stone was laid by the Prince of Wales in 1878 the square's iron railings were removed, transverse walks formed, and flower beds introduced.

The terrace of houses along the east side of the square was demolished in 1883 as the site for the Glasgow City Chambers, designed by the architect William Young. Its foundation stone was laid on 6 October 1883, and the building was completed in 1889.

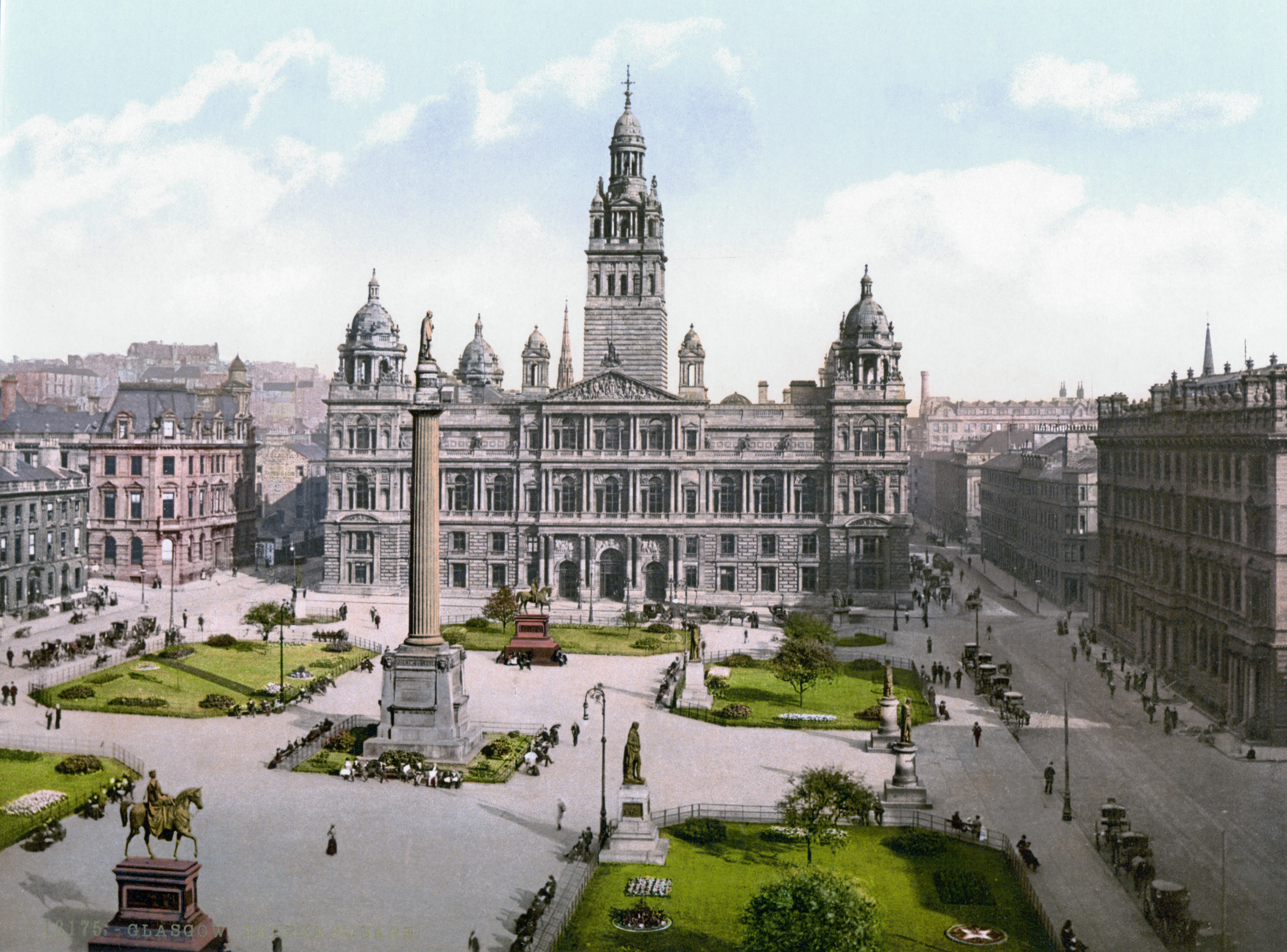
Layout of George Square, Glasgow circa 1900.

The terrace built 1807–1818 between Queen Street and Hanover Street on the north side of the square became known as the Queen's Hotel. In 1905 it became the North British Railway company's North British Station Hotel, and the attic was converted into a fourth storey, under a mansard roof giving further accommodation. Since 1878 Kate Cranston had made a great success of her Tea Rooms. Following the death of her husband in 1917 she sold several of her assets, including the Willow Tearooms, and at the age of 68 settled herself in the North British which was now the last hotel in the square, looking over the sites of the hotels where she had been born and grew up. In 1933 she moved to a house where she was looked after by a lady companion, and she died on 18 April 1934. Following nationalisation, the hotel came under British Transport Hotels. The gable of Queen Street Station's curved glass roof remained visible above its main entrance until 1969 when a new building was constructed supported by columns over the entrance way: this subsequently became an extension to the hotel. In 1984 British Rail sold the hotel, which was now called the Copthorne Hotel, and in 1986 a ground floor conservatory was built along its frontage, extending out to the pavement of the square. It was subsequently renamed the Millennium Hotel, and is now a listed building, the only survivor of the original terraces around George Square.

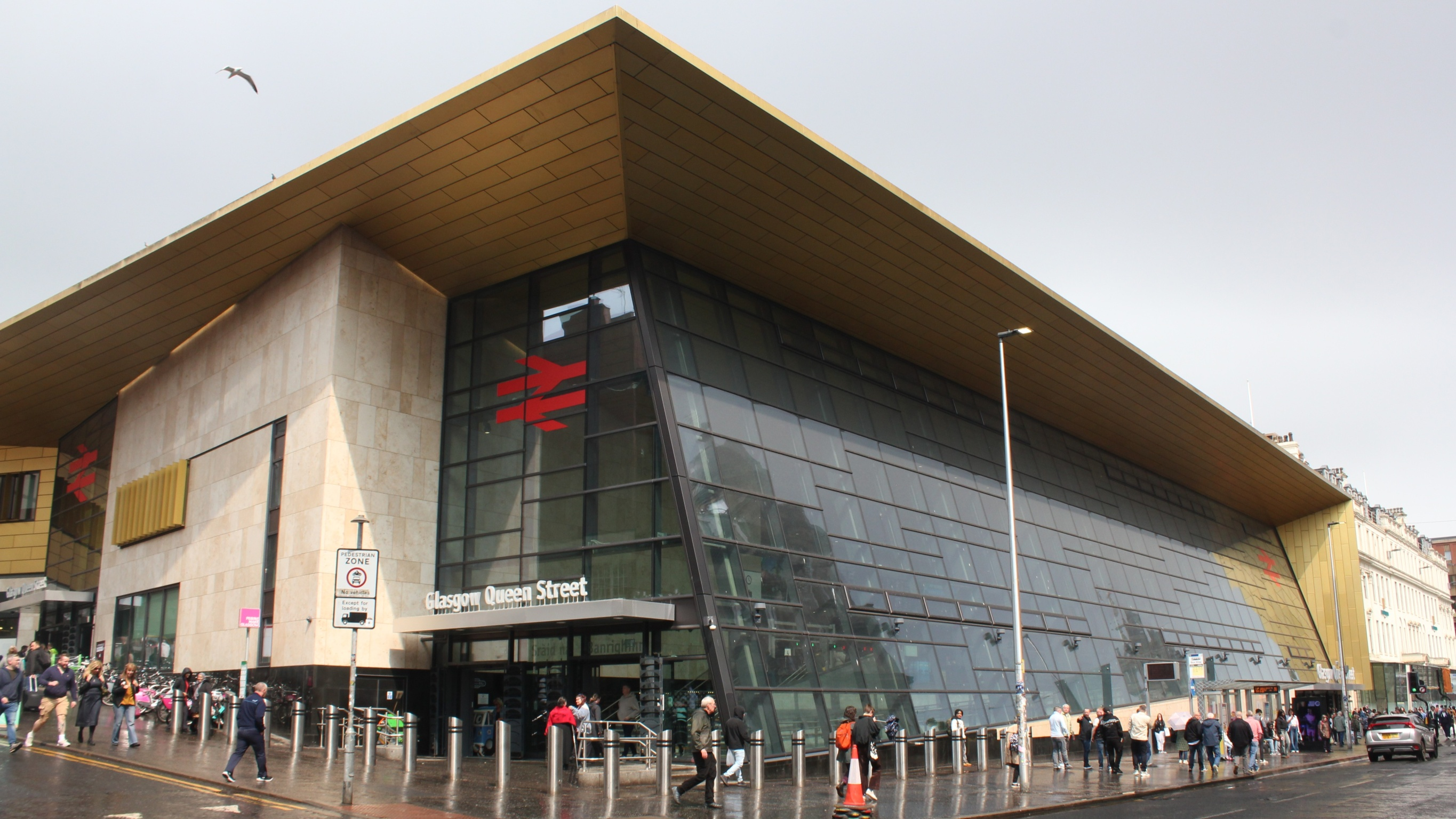
Glasgow Queen Street (2025)

Major reconstruction of Queen Street Station has seen demolition of its buildings along George Square and round the corner to Dundas Street, construction of the new glazed entrance from George Square began in December 2018. The Millennium Hotel has put forward proposals for major works including new rooms to replace those which were above the station entrance.

== Prominent buildings ==
=== East side ===
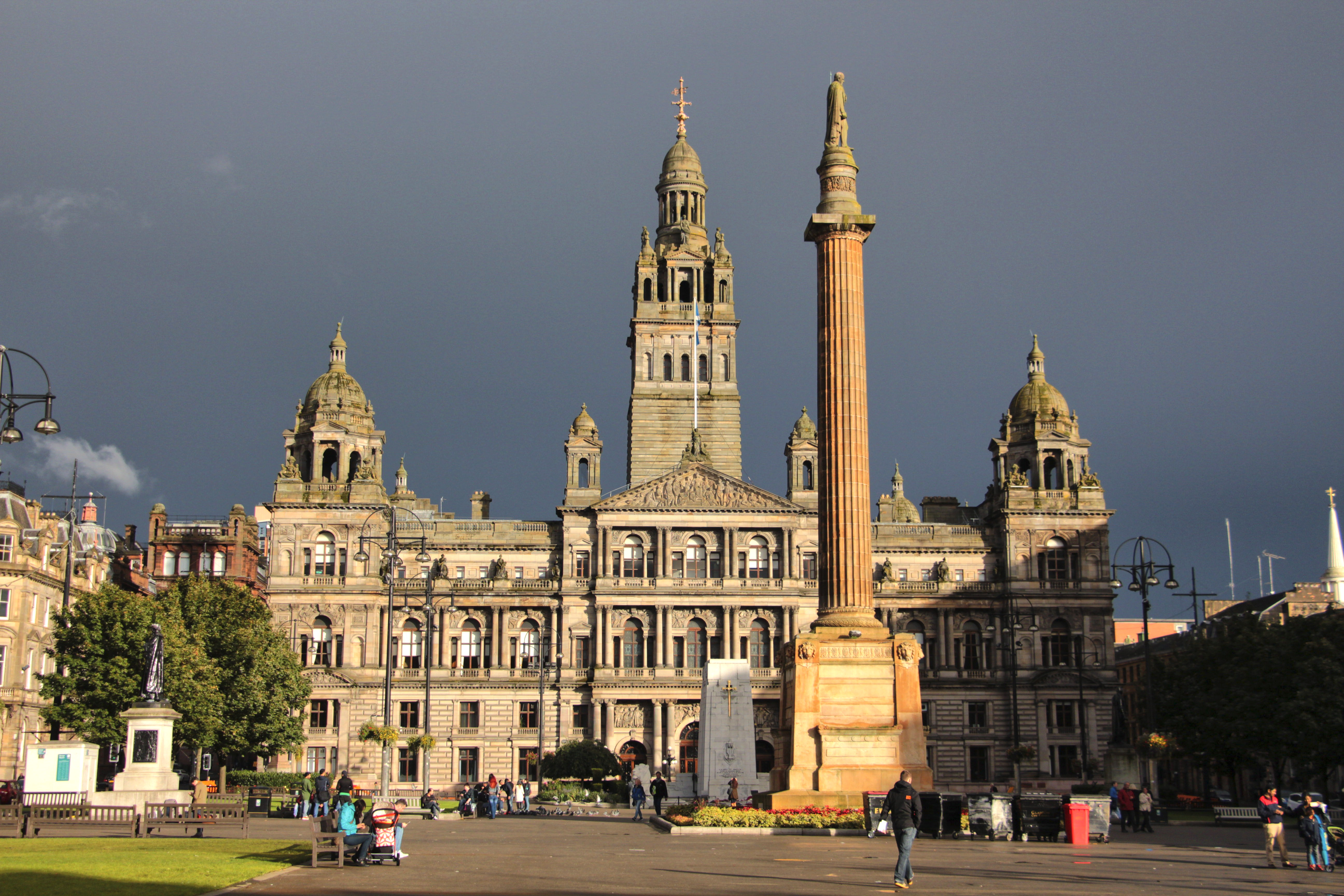
The Scott Monument, erected 1837, long before construction of the City Chambers which were completed in 1889.

Today the east side of the square, linking North Frederick Street and South Frederick Street, is dominated by the ornate Glasgow City Chambers, designed by architect William Young, and completed in 1889.

=== South side ===
On the South side, linking Cochrane Street and St Vincent Place, the former General Post Office built in 1878 takes up the block between South Frederick Street and South Hanover Street. It was redeveloped into offices in 2007. The block between there and Queen Street has a Chicago-style office building, dating from 1924. The city's main Tourist Information Centre was located in a prefabricated wooden building on the west side of the square from the 1960s to the mid 1980s, when it then moved to the buildings on the southern side, but has since moved to Buchanan Street.

=== North side ===
The North side, running along George Street towards the University of Strathclyde, has the entrance to Queen Street Station followed by a terrace of three townhouses built 1807–1818, then enlarged with an additional storey in 1905 as the North British Railway's Hotel (now the Millennium Hotel). To the east of North Hanover Street, George House was built in 1979–1980 (replacing an older Georgian building) to provide extra office space for Glasgow City Council. It was for many years the Glasgow offices of the financial and legal firm Ernst & Young. Since the early 1960s the northern vista of the square has been dominated by the tower block of Glasgow College of Building and Printing (retrospectively known as the Met Tower), which stands half way up North Hanover Street.

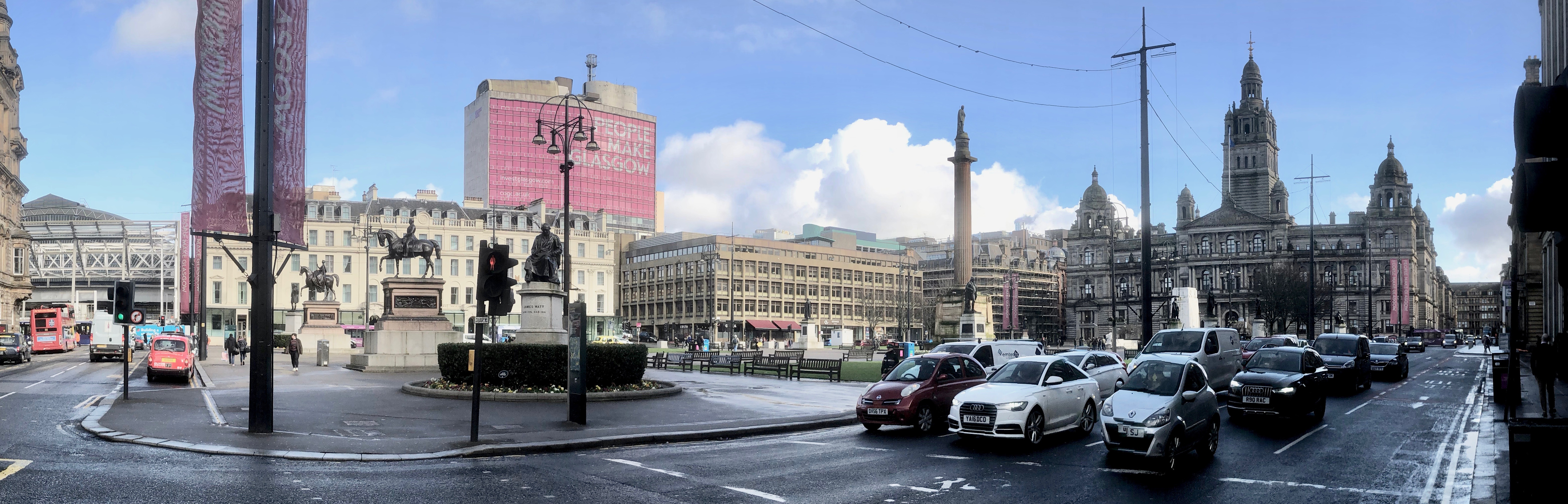
The north side of George Square viewed from Queen Street in 2019, during the railway station's remodelling, with the prominent Met Tower (1964) overlooking the square and George House (1980) to its right

=== West side ===
Queen Street, running parallel to the square's West side, was formerly a row of hotels and now features the Merchants' House building for the guildry formed in 1603 to establish the rights, duties and privileges of the merchants and craftsmen of Glasgow. Westbourne Music perform regularly here in a series of Merchants Music, as do jazz ensembles and other instrumentalists. The building also houses the Glasgow Chamber of Commerce, founded in 1783. Designed by John Burnet and opened in 1874, two storeys were added to the Merchants' House by his son J.J. Burnet in 1907 and are topped by a domed tower on which is perched the emblem of the House a ship on a globe, a reminder of the importance of sea trade to Glasgow's prosperity. The western side is also the location of the former Bank of Scotland building, and even more palatial buildings sweep round to St Vincent Place and Buchanan Street.

== Monuments and statues ==
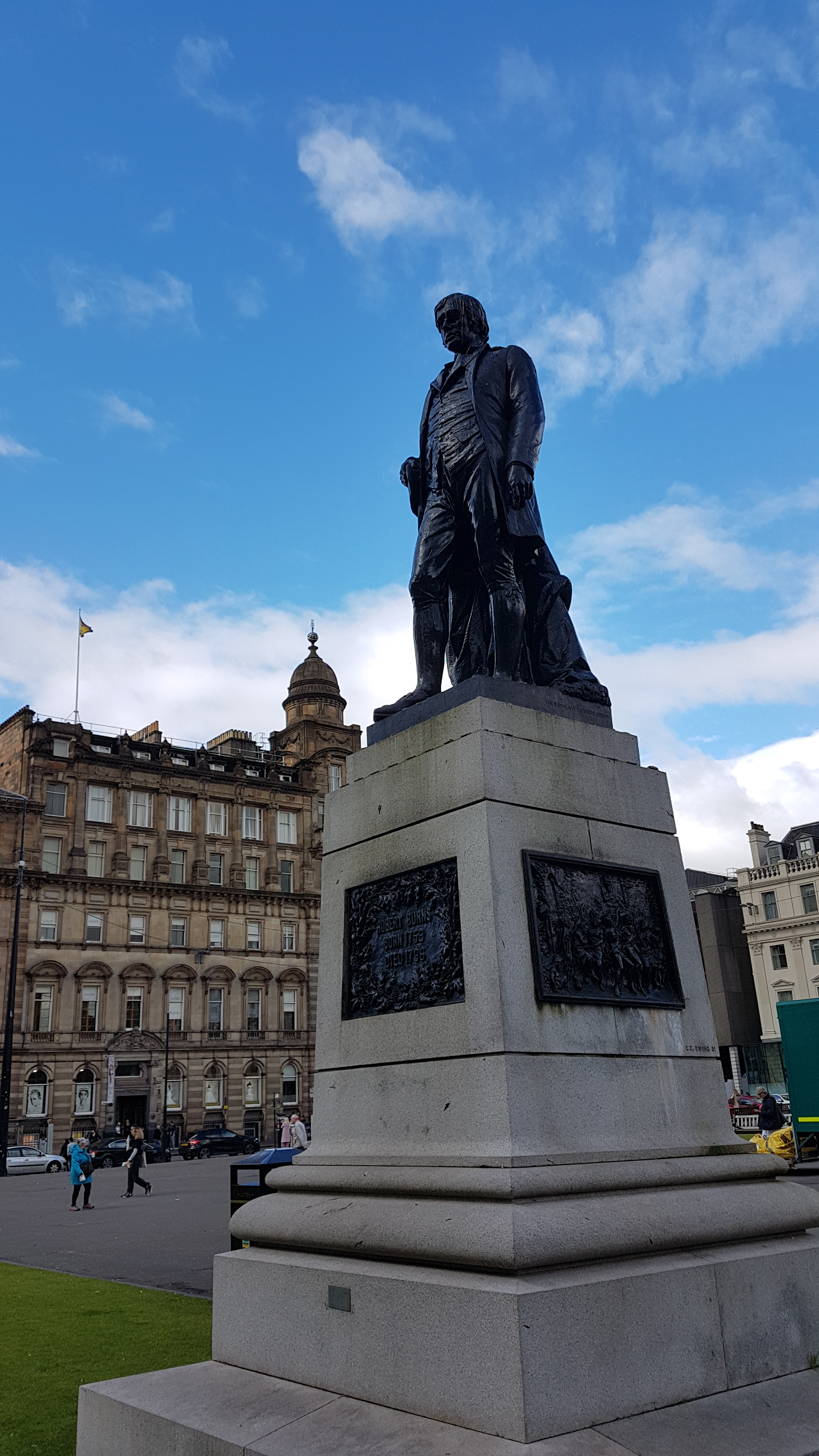
Statue of Robert Burns, George Square, Glasgow

The eastern side of the square itself is flanked by two lawns and is also the site of the Glasgow Cenotaph, which was designed by Sir John James Burnet and originally built to commemorate Glaswegians killed in the First World War. It was conceived in 1921, and unveiled in 1924 by Field Marshall Earl Haig.

The 80-foot-high (24 m) column in the centre of the square celebrates author Sir Walter Scott. It was erected in 1837. Eleven of Glasgow's many other public statues are situated around the square: the only known equestrian statues of a young Queen Victoria 1854 in St Vincent Place at Buchanan Street and moved to George Square in 1866 beside her husband Prince Albert 1866 both sculpted by Carlo Marochetti, erected in 1865 and 1866 respectively; poets Robert Burns sculpted by George Edwin Ewing, 1877, and Thomas Campbell sculpted by William Bodie, 1877; inventor James Watt sculpted by Francis Leggatt Chantrey, 1832; chemist Thomas Graham sculpted by William Brodie, 1872; General Sir John Moore sculpted by John Flaxman, 1819, and Field Marshall Lord Clyde sculpted by John Henry Foley, 1868; and politicians William Ewart Gladstone sculpted by William Hamo Thornycroft, 1902, Robert Peel sculpted by John Mossman, 1859, and James Oswald sculpted by Carlo Marochetti, 1856, first located at Charing Cross and moved to George Square in 1875.

== Social history ==
George Square is also a place for musical events, light shows, ceremonies, sporting celebrations, political gatherings, and for annual Remembrance Day parades.

The square has often been the scene of political events and, protests. Perhaps the most famous was the Battle of George Square in 1919, when skilled engineers campaigning for a 40-hour working week held a rally. Although a crowd of over 100,000 is often claimed, contemporary sources put it at 20–25,000. The meeting descended into violence between the protesters and the police, with the riot act being read. The city's radical reputation, and the raising of the red flag on 27 January (although the strike leaders disassociated themselves from this action), made some members of the Coalition government fear a Bolshevik revolution was afoot. The Sheriff of Lanarkshire called for military assistance. Ten thousand troops, mainly from Scotland, were deployed, although they did not arrive until the riot was over. Six tanks arrived the following Monday, but never left their depot in the Cattle Market.

In February 2005, the square was closed to pedestrians for a two-month restoration project, including the replacement of the red asphalt concourse, and the cleaning of stone and the statues in the square, most notably that of Walter Scott.

Scenes for the zombie movie World War Z were filmed in the square in August 2011, using the resemblance of buildings to Philadelphia's financial district.

Plans to remove the greenspace and lease the area for temporary businesses and events has been controversial. In 2012 a campaign was started to restore the square to its previous state.

== Remodelling ==
=== 2012 Scheme ===
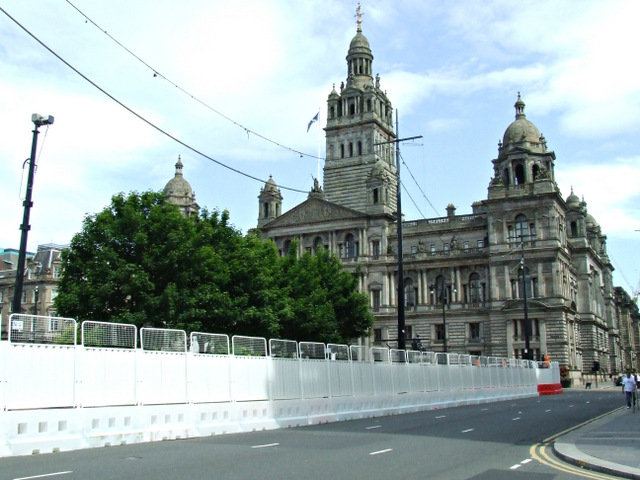
Barriers around the perimeter of George square for redevelopment works in 2013

In 2012 Glasgow City Council voted to spend £15m on a "makeover", of the square, in preparation for the 2014 Commonwealth Games, to make it "a place fit for the 21st Century". The plans included removing all of the monuments and statues in the square, ostensibly for restoration. However, the council said that "it is possible" that the monuments "may not return to the square", but will rather be relocated to "an area of regeneration". Only one monument was certain to remain; the Cenotaph by Sir John James Burnet.

On 9 January 2013, the six shortlisted designs were put on display to the public in a nearby gallery. All the designs featured at least half the statues returning, with many containing all 11. Claiming public opposition, the council leader Gordon Matheson announced the cancellation of the redevelopment plan on the very day the winner (by John McAslan & Partners) was announced. Councillor Matheson had supported a different proposal from the one chosen by an expert panel of judges.

=== 2024 Scheme ===
On 4 June 2024 Glasgow City Council confirmed that work would take place to re-design the square as part of the wider Avenues project, with work starting in January 2025 and major developments beginning the following April. In May, perimeter hoardings were put in place around the square and it became closed to the public. As part of the remodelling, the statues in the square were removed at some point between January and March 2025, and were restored.

The work is designed to deliver the following improvements:

- high-quality stone throughout
- informal 'play' areas for children in sensory gardens in the eastern areas
- A raised lawn platform
- New trees species will be planted to add to the existing Norway Maple and Cherry trees in the Square
- New seating to add to the remembrance benches
- Feature lighting

The improvements to the square are being funded as part of the larger Avenues programme which is part of the Glasgow City Region City Deal with funding being provided by the Scottish and UK Governments, and Glasgow City Council. Each Government is contributing funding of £8.815 million towards the main contract for the George Square and surrounding Avenues project.
