= Statue of Sir John Moore =

Statue in Glasgow, Scotland

Coordinates: 55°51′39″N 4°15′01″W

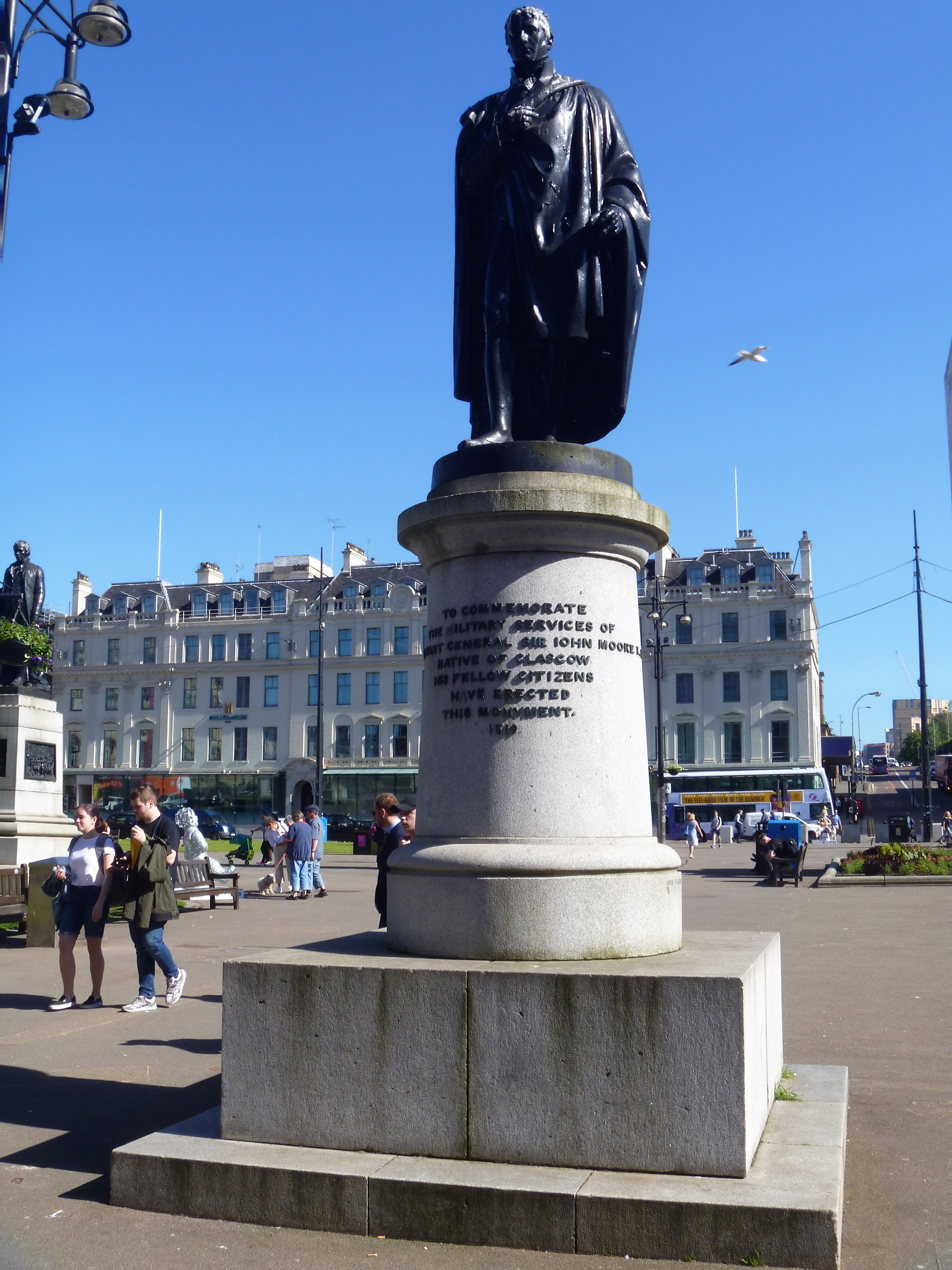
The statue in 2019

The Statue of Sir John Moore is a bronze statue located in George Square in Glasgow. It commemorates the British Army general John Moore of the Napoleonic Wars who was born and raised in the city. He became a national hero following his death during his victory at the Battle of Corunna in 1809. The statue was designed by the English sculptor John Flaxman, a leading figure in the Royal Academy during the Regency era, and was erected in 1819 on a pedestal of Aberdeen granite. It stands nearby the Scott Monument and a statue of another noted military commander Lord Clyde. In 1966 it was given Category A listing.

== Bibliography ==
- Barczewski, Stephanie L. Heroic Failure and the British.Yale University Press, 1 Jan 2016
- Lindsay, Maurice. Glasgow: Fabric of a City. R. Hale, 2001.
