= Glasgow Cenotaph =

War memorial

Coordinates: 55°51′40″N 4°14′58″W

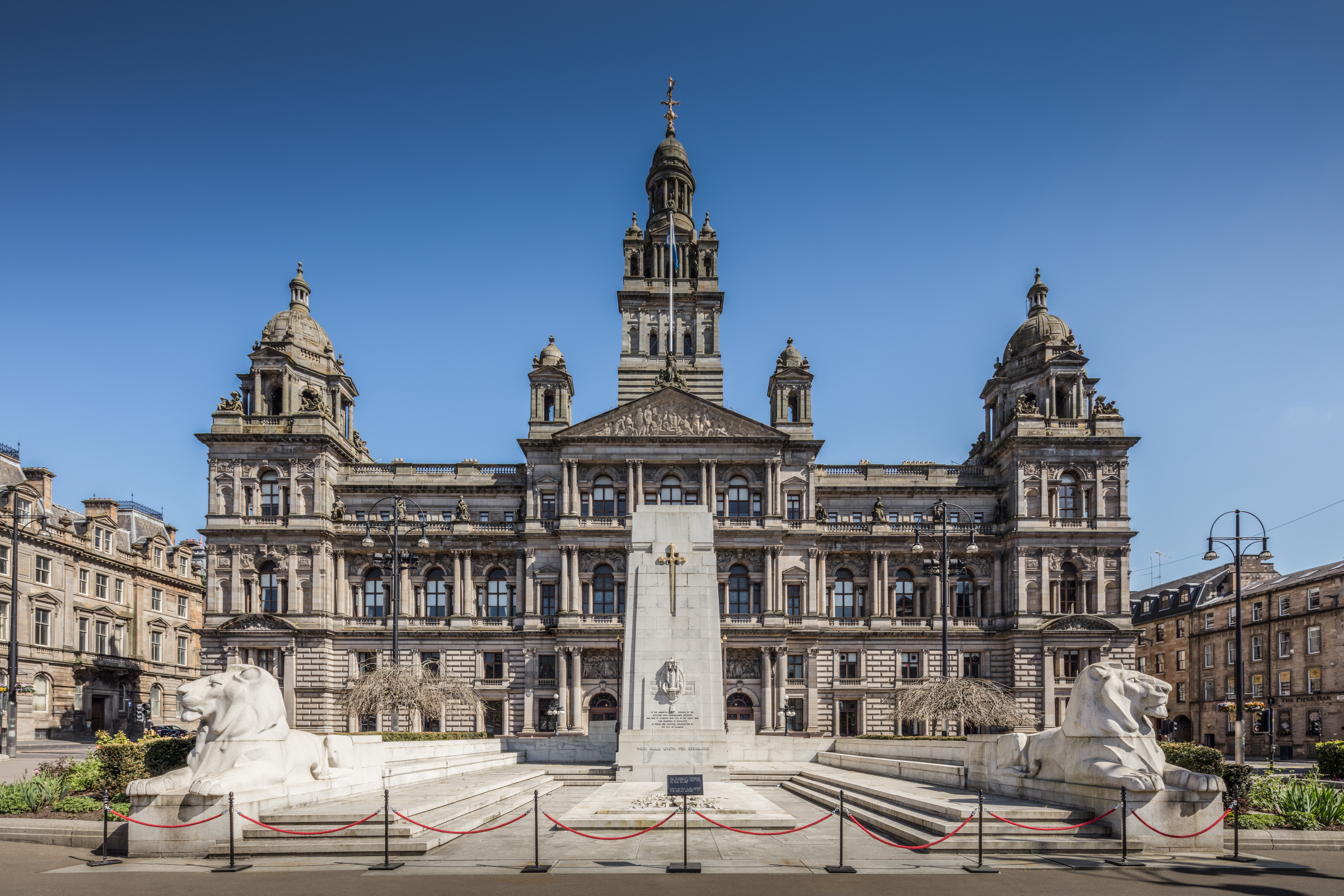
Glasgow Cenotaph, in front of Glasgow City Chambers.

Glasgow Cenotaph, also known as Glasgow War Memorial, is a war memorial which stands on the east side of George Square in Glasgow, in front of Glasgow City Chambers. It was originally constructed to commemorate Glaswegians killed during the First World War, and was unveiled by Field Marshal Douglas Haig, 1st Earl Haig in 1924. Further inscriptions were added after the Second World War, and the memorial became a Grade B listed building in 1970.

== Background ==
Over 200,000 men from Glasgow, about a fifth of the whole city population, served in the armed forces during the First World War. Around 18,000 were killed and 35,000 were injured.

A war memorial committee was established, chaired by the Lord Provost Sir James Watson Stuart, which in 1920 agreed three proposals: to erect of a cenotaph as a public memorial in George Square; to provide financial support for the existing Prince Albert Memorial Workshops which had been opened in 1919 at Killearn Street in Possilpark to train disabled servicemen; and lastly any remaining funds would to be distributed to charity. The Prince Albert workshops continued from 1919 to 1923, before being combined with training facilities elsewhere.

== Design ==
Designs for the public memorial were sought from several architects, including Robert Lorimer, Edwin Lutyens, and George Frampton, but in 1921 the committee selected a design by John James Burnet and Norman Aitken Dick. The design incorporates sculptures of stone lions and a stone statue of St Mungo by Ernest Gillick

The memorial is constructed from polished light grey granite supplied by Scott and Rae. At its centre is a tall cenotaph in the form of truncated granite pylon some 9.7 m (32 ft) high supporting an empty sarcophagus, with a large gilded metal sword as a cross high up on the front (west) face. Lower on the west face is a stone statue of the city's patron saint, St Mungo, under a canopy, surrounded by a mandorla with the city's motto "Let Glasgow Flourish", and supported by the coat of arms of Glasgow. The rear (east) face bears a carving of the Scottish version of the Royal coat of arms of the United Kingdom.

The longer north and south sides of the cenotaph are largely plain, with two stone wreaths carved either side of the sarcophagus at the top, and six bronze flagpoles with wreaths around the east end.

Stone arms rise on three steps to the north and south sides of the obelisk, turning to the west to form three sides of an enclosure open to the west, with a sculpture of a guardant couchant lion at the west end of each arm. A large stone slab is set into the ground within the enclosure, as if covering a tomb, bearing stone carvings of a wreath and a palm leaf.

The obelisk bears several inscriptions. On the west face, carved into the stone either side of the figure of St Mungo: "PRO PATRIA / 1914 1919 / 1939 1945" and then below, in raised lead letters: "TO THE IMMORTAL HONOUR OF THE / OFFICERS NON-COMMISSIONED OFFICERS / AND MEN OF GLASGOW WHO FELL IN THE GREAT WAR / THIS MEMORIAL IS DEDICATED / IN PROUD AND GRATEFUL RECOGNITION BY / THE CITY OF GLASGOW" and then, carved into the stone at the base of the cenotaph: "THEIR NAME LIVETH FOR EVERMORE"

On the east face, carded to either side of the royal coat of arms is "PRO PATRIA / 1914 1919" and then below raised lead letters read: "TOTAL OF / HIS MAJESTY'S FORCES / ENGAGED / AT HOME AND ABROAD / 8654465 / OF THIS NUMBER / THE CITY OF GLASGOW / RAISED OVER 200000" and then in smaller letters "UNVEILED / ON / SATURDAY 31ST MAY 1924 / BY / FIELD MARSHAL EARL HAIG OF BEMERSYDE / GM KT GCB / COMMANDER IN CHIEF OF THE EXPEDITIONARY / FORCES IN FRANCE AND FLANDERS / 1915-1919"

Further raised lead letters on the south and north faces read, respectively: "GREATER LOVE HATH NO MAN / THAN THIS / THAT A MAN LAY DOWN HIS LIFE / FOR HIS FRIENDS", quoting from John 15:13; and "THESE DIED IN WAR / THAT WE AT PEACE MIGHT LIVE / THESE GAVE THEIR BEST / SO WE OUR BEST SHOULD GIVE".

The monument was unveiled on 31 May 1924 by Field Marshal Douglas Haig, 1st Earl Haig. It became a Grade B listed building in 1970.

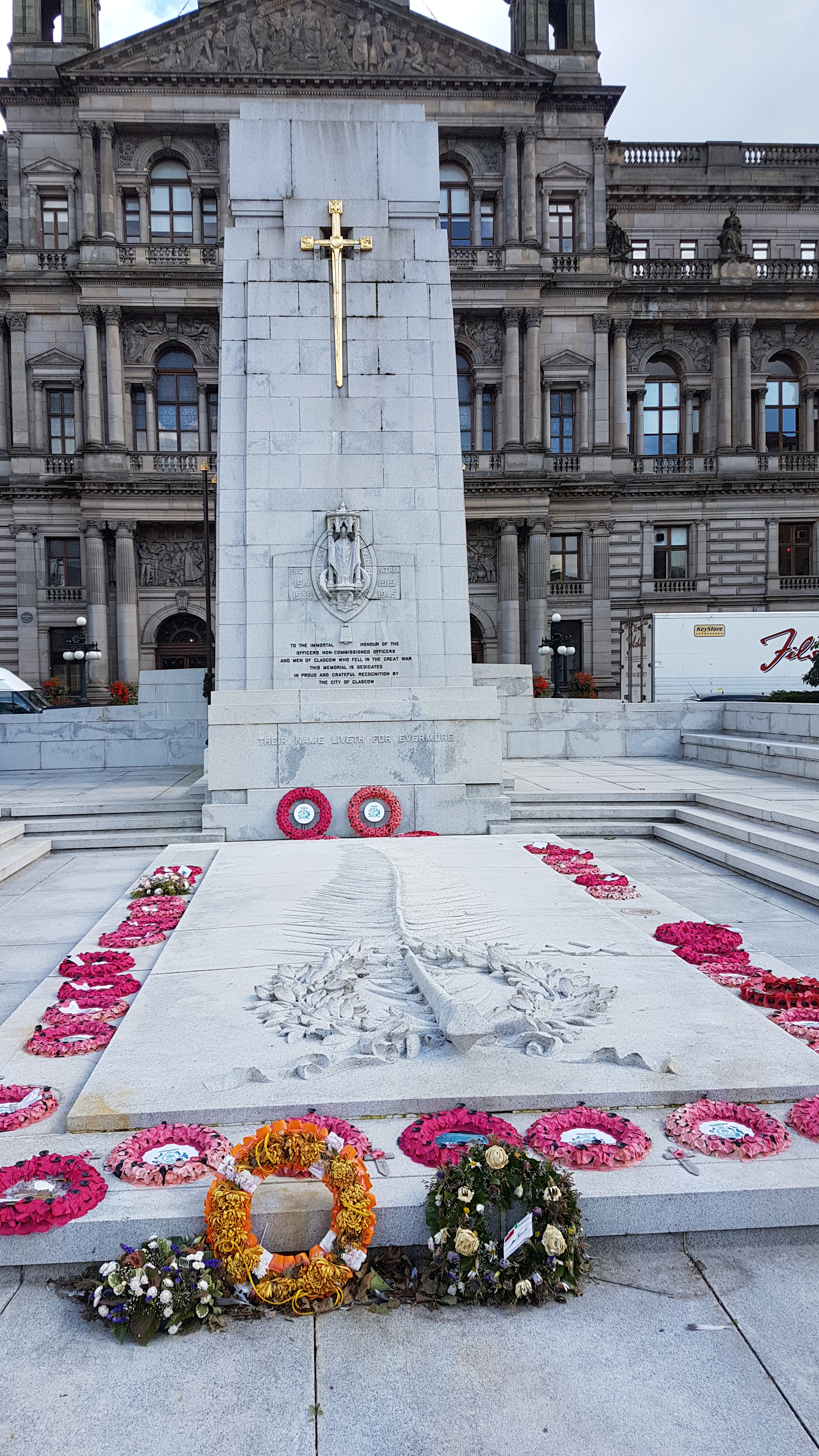
West face and sarcophagus

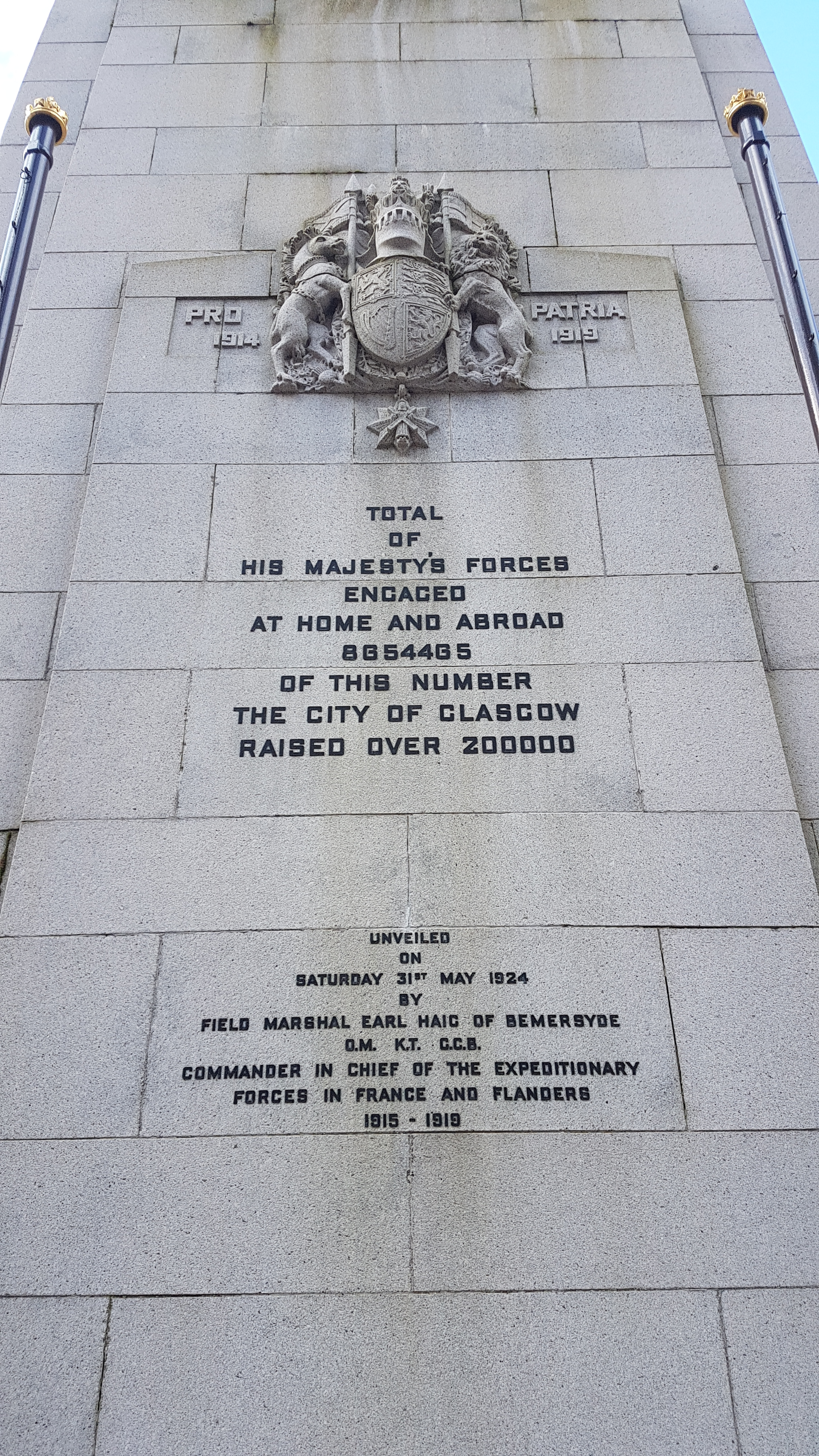
East face

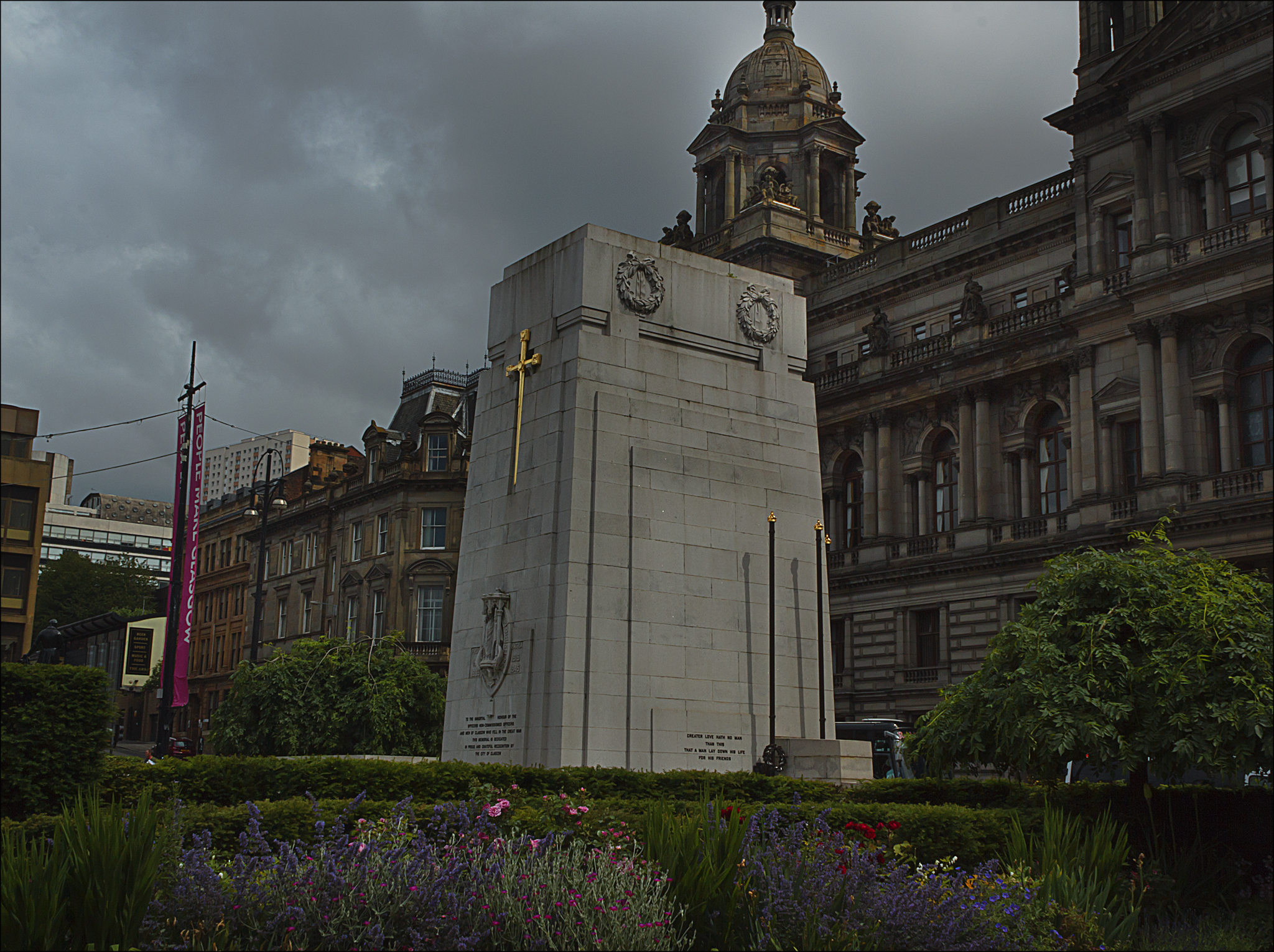
From the south west, showing south elevation

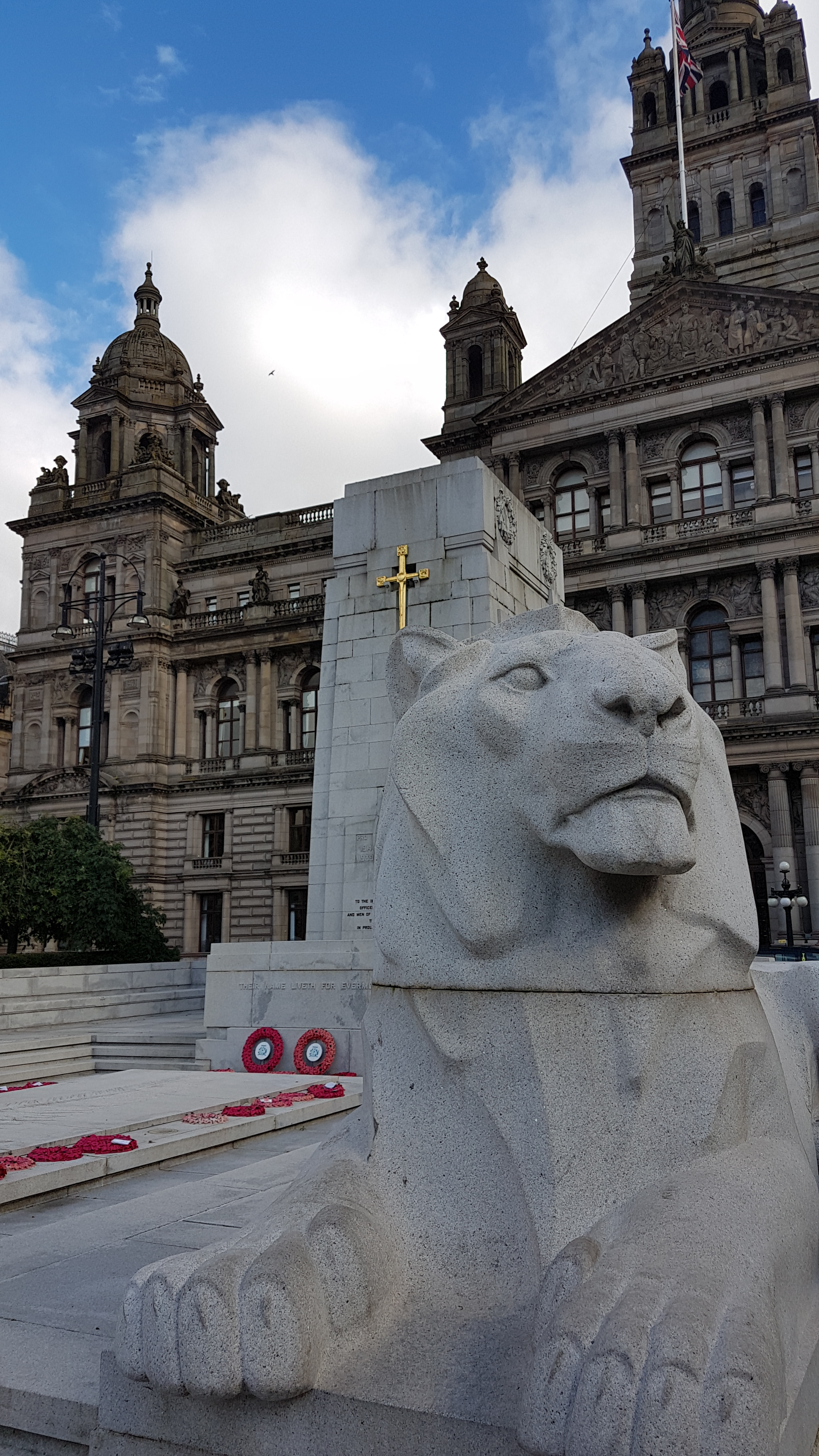
Lion
