= John Greenshields =

Scottish sculptor (1795–1835)

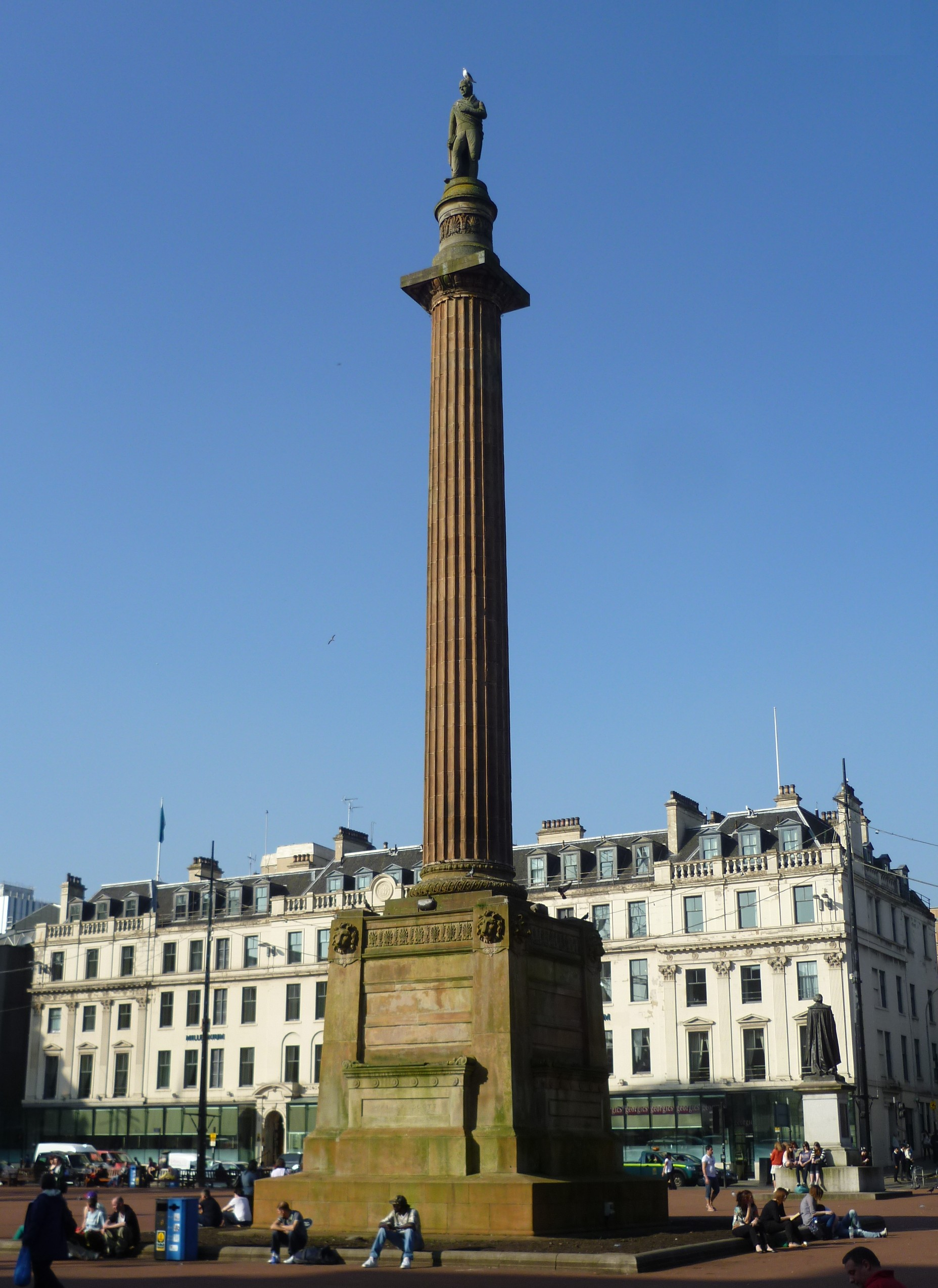
Scott Monument, Glasgow

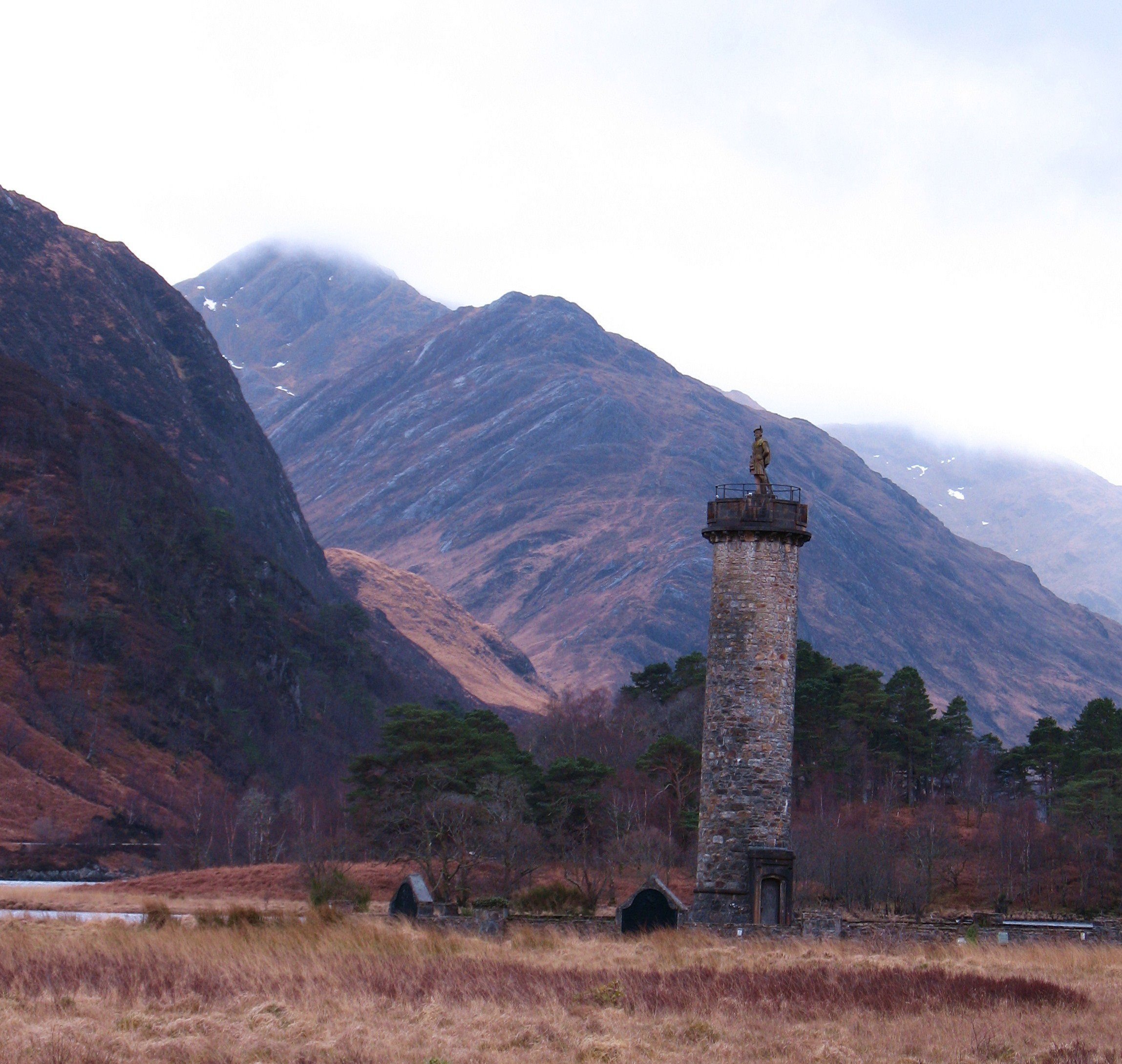
The Glenfinnan Monument

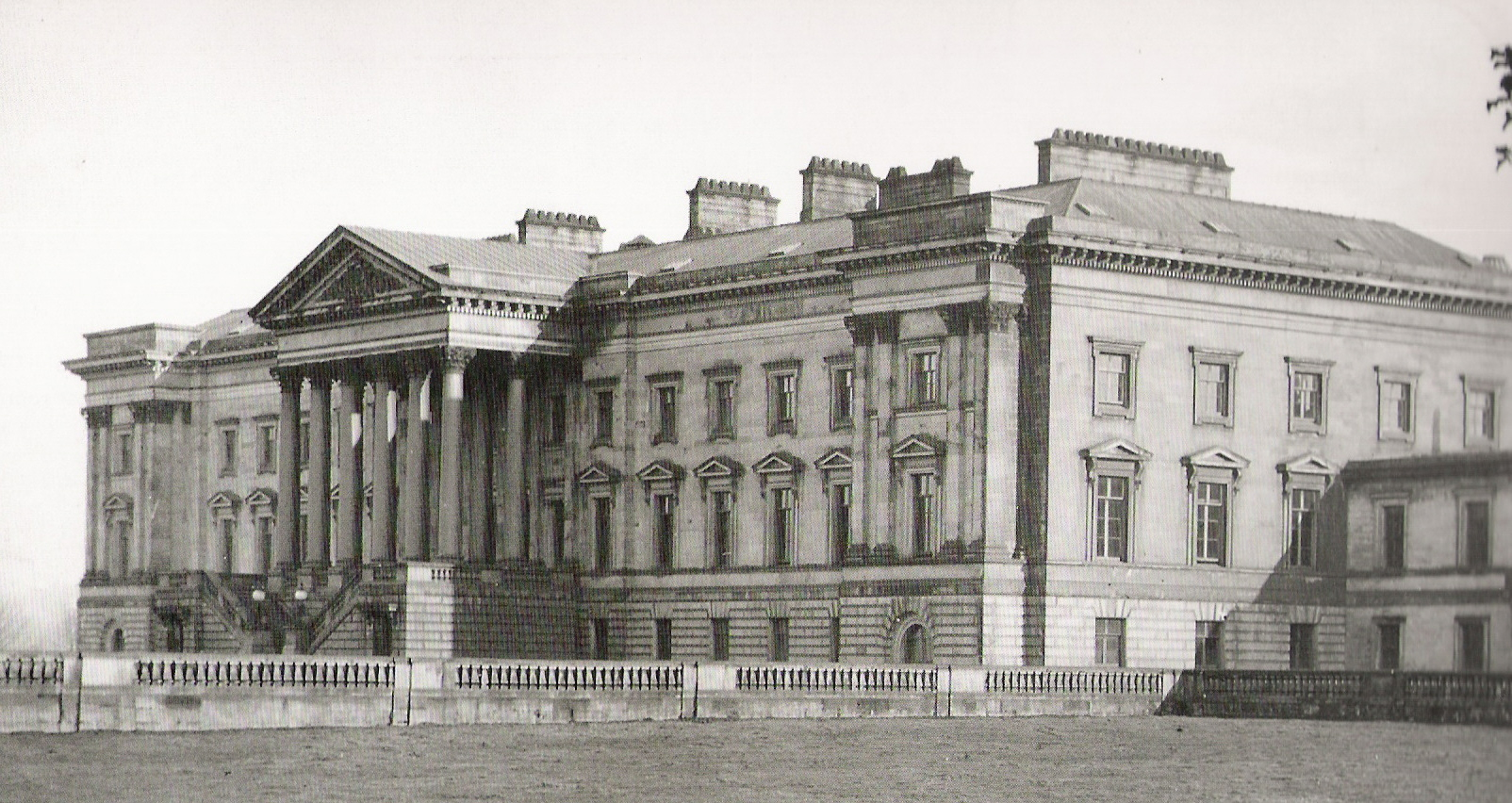
Hamilton Palace

John Greenshields (28 September 1795 – 24 April 1835) was a talented but short-lived Scottish sculptor. His most notable works are probably the statue of Sir Walter Scott in Parliament House, Edinburgh, The Scott Monument in Glasgow and the statue of Bonnie Prince Charlie on the Glenfinnan Monument. He also created a series of works depicting scenes from the works of Robert Burns.

Professor John Wilson referred to him as “an original genius” in his work Noctes Ambrosianae.

== Life ==
He was born in Lesmahagow on 28 September 1795, the eldest of six sons (five surviving) to James Greenshields (1754-1838) a farmer, and his wife, Betty Jack. In early life they moved to Willans, a cottage in Carluke near Crossford, South Lanarkshire, and in Crossford Greenshields first became an apprentice masonic sculptor, under a Mr Cadzow.

Around 1822 he went to Edinburgh to act as an assistant sculptor to Robert Forrest. Here he met Sir Walter Scott who became his artistic patron and friend. Scott described Greenshields as a sensible, powerfully-minded person and also there is much about that man that reminds me of Burns. During this period he lived in a cottage on the Milton estate of Scott's friend, William Lockhart.

From around 1829 he returned to work from Willans and Scott visited him there at least twice, the second in the company of John Gibson Lockhart.

He died at Willans on 24 April 1835 and was buried in Lesmahagow churchyard.

== Principal works ==
- Heraldic panels in the pediment of Hamilton Palace (1822) now demolished
- James Watt for the Mechanics Institute on Bath St, Glasgow (1824)
- Lord Byron (1825)
- A seated figure of Robert Burns wearing a hat, based on the portrait of Burns by his friend, Peter Taylor (1826 for William Taylor of Leith) this was exhibited at The Crystal Palace in 1859 and exported to Australia in 1882) now in the botanical gardens in Camperdown, Victoria. The recently restored statue was unveiled by Ted Baillieu in 2012.
- George Canning (1827)
- Duke of York (1828)
- Marble bust of Sir Walter Scott, Abbotsford House (c.1830)
- Seated figure of Sir Walter Scott for Powderham Castle (1832)
- Statue of Sir Walter Scott in George Square, Glasgow (1834) standing atop a huge column by Alexander Handyside Ritchie and the statue completed by William Mossman after Greenshields’ death
- Sir Walter Scott in Parliament House, Edinburgh (1835) inscribed Sic Sedebat
- Statue atop the Glenfinnan Monument (1835)
- Eight figures representing The Jolly Beggars (1835) much criticised by Scott Exhibited in both Edinburgh and London and later moved to Gunnersbury Park
