= Cathedral Square, Glasgow =

Public square in Glasgow, Scotland

Coordinates: 55.8628°N 4.2361°W

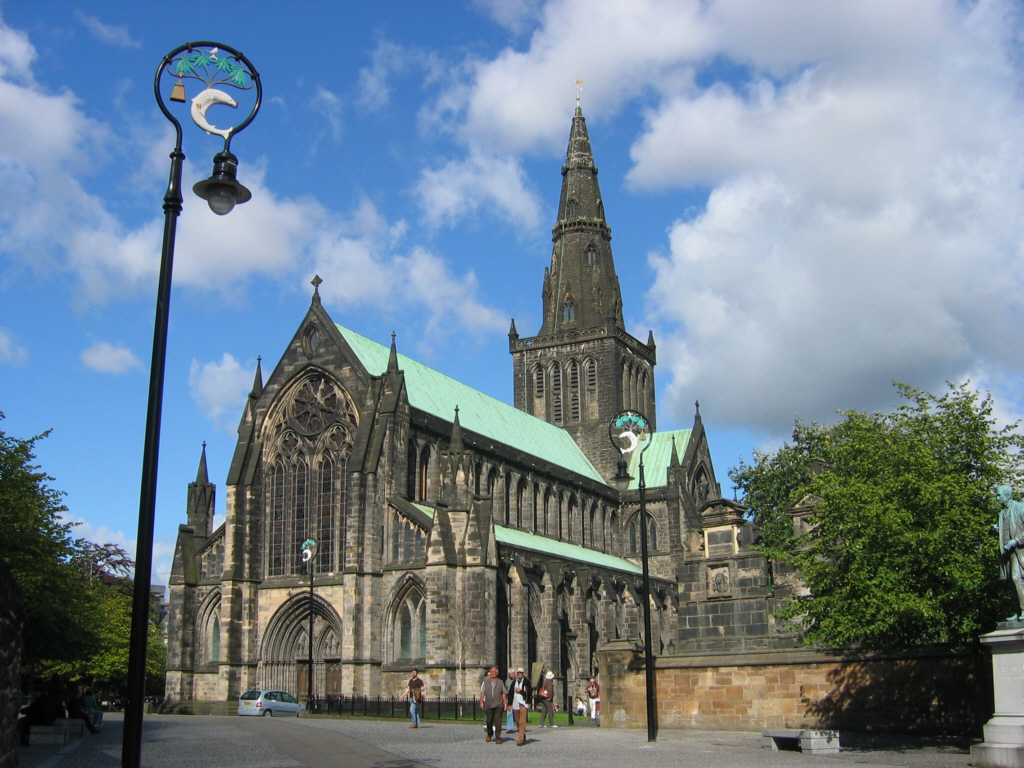
Glasgow Cathedral as viewed from the north side of Cathedral Square.

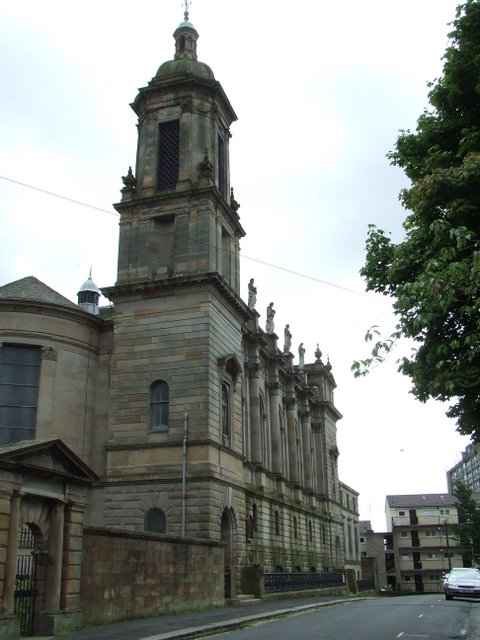
Glasgow Evangelical Church - in Cathedral Square, Glasgow

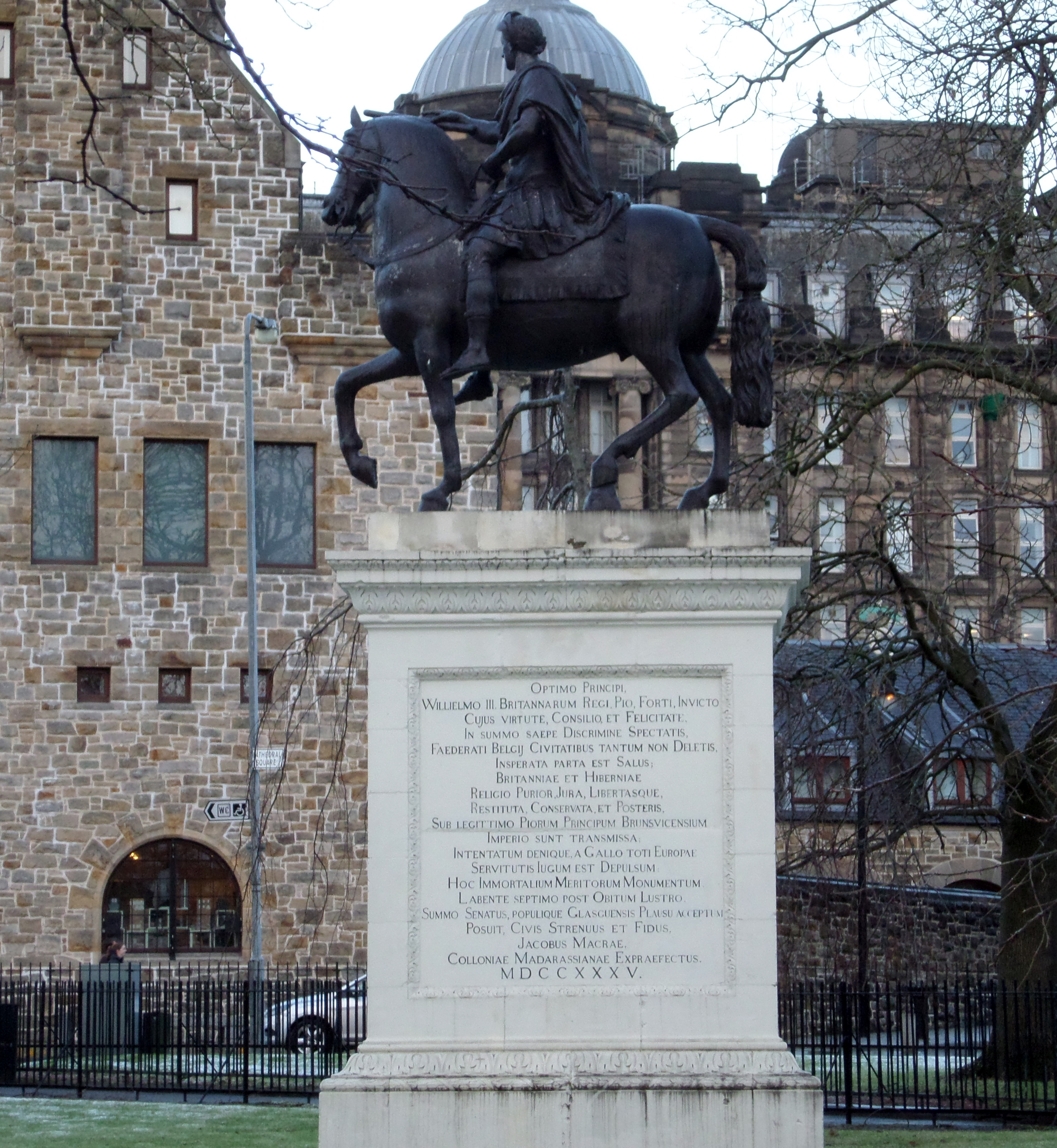
King William III & II, of Orange, statue in Cathedral Square, Glasgow, with St Mungo Museum back left.

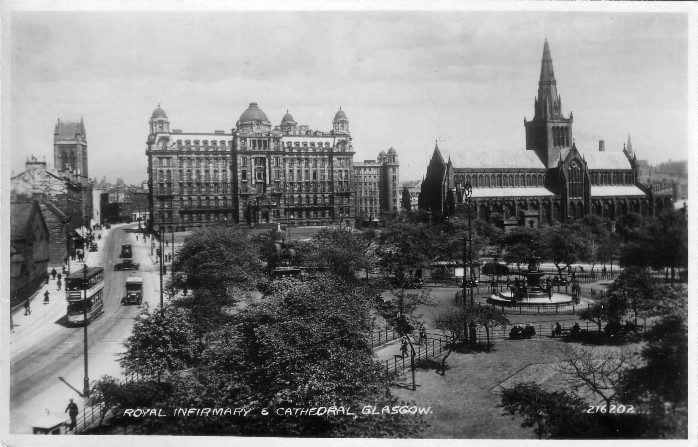
Postcard view from Cathedral Square, Glasgow of the Royal Infirmary and Glasgow Cathedral

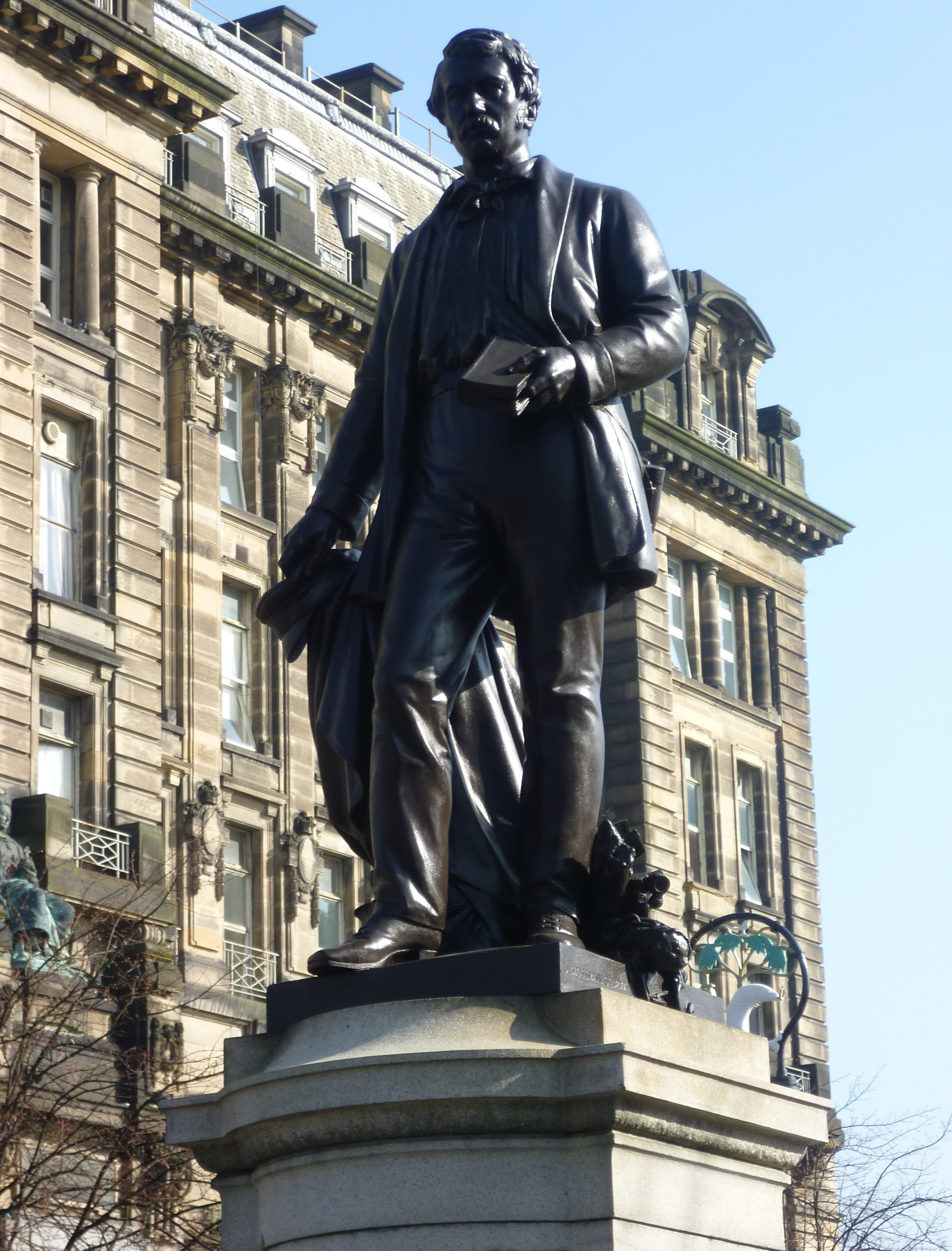
David Livingstone statue, Cathedral Square, Glasgow

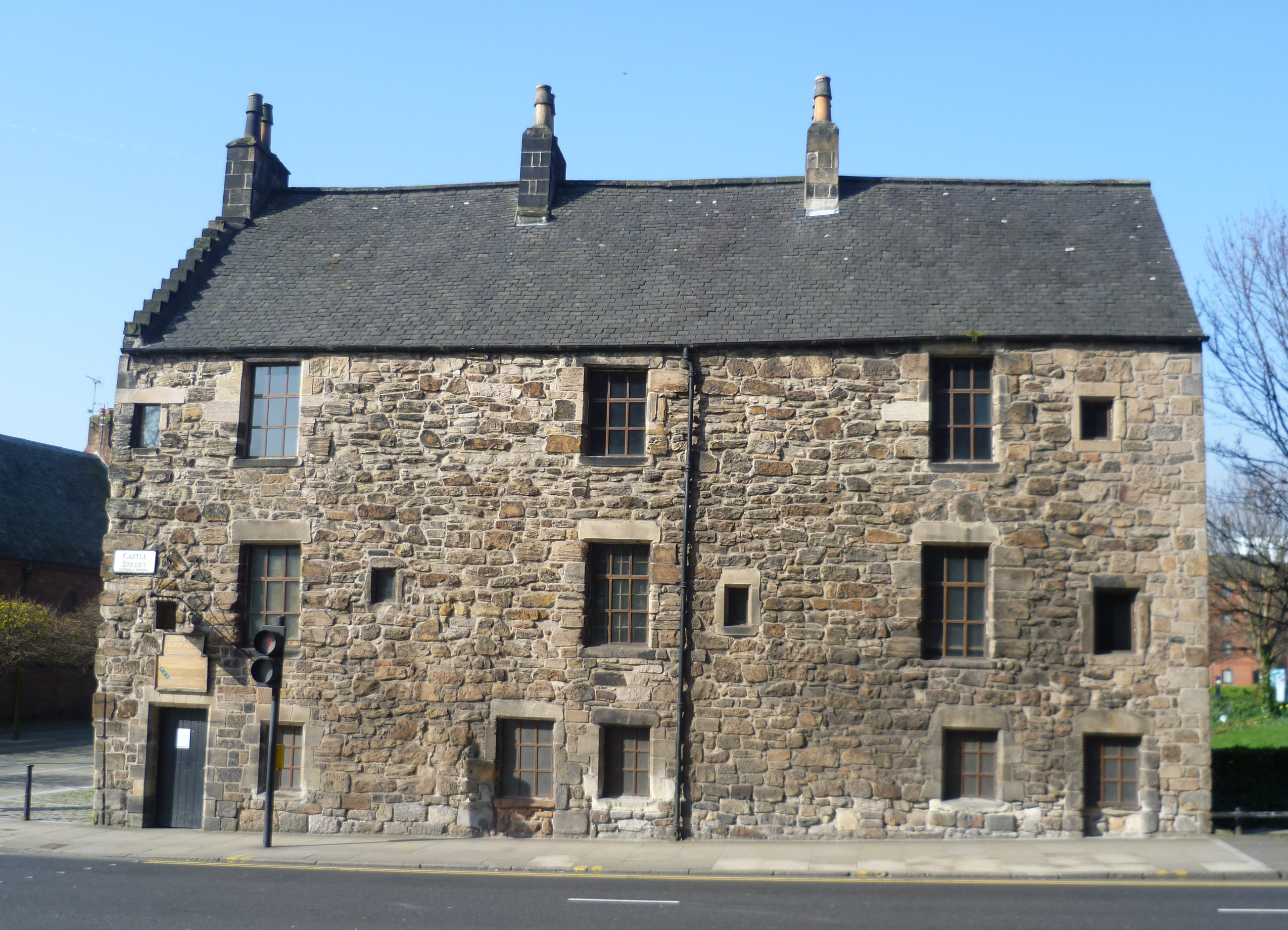
Provand's Lordship on Castle Street facing on to the corner of Cathedral Square.

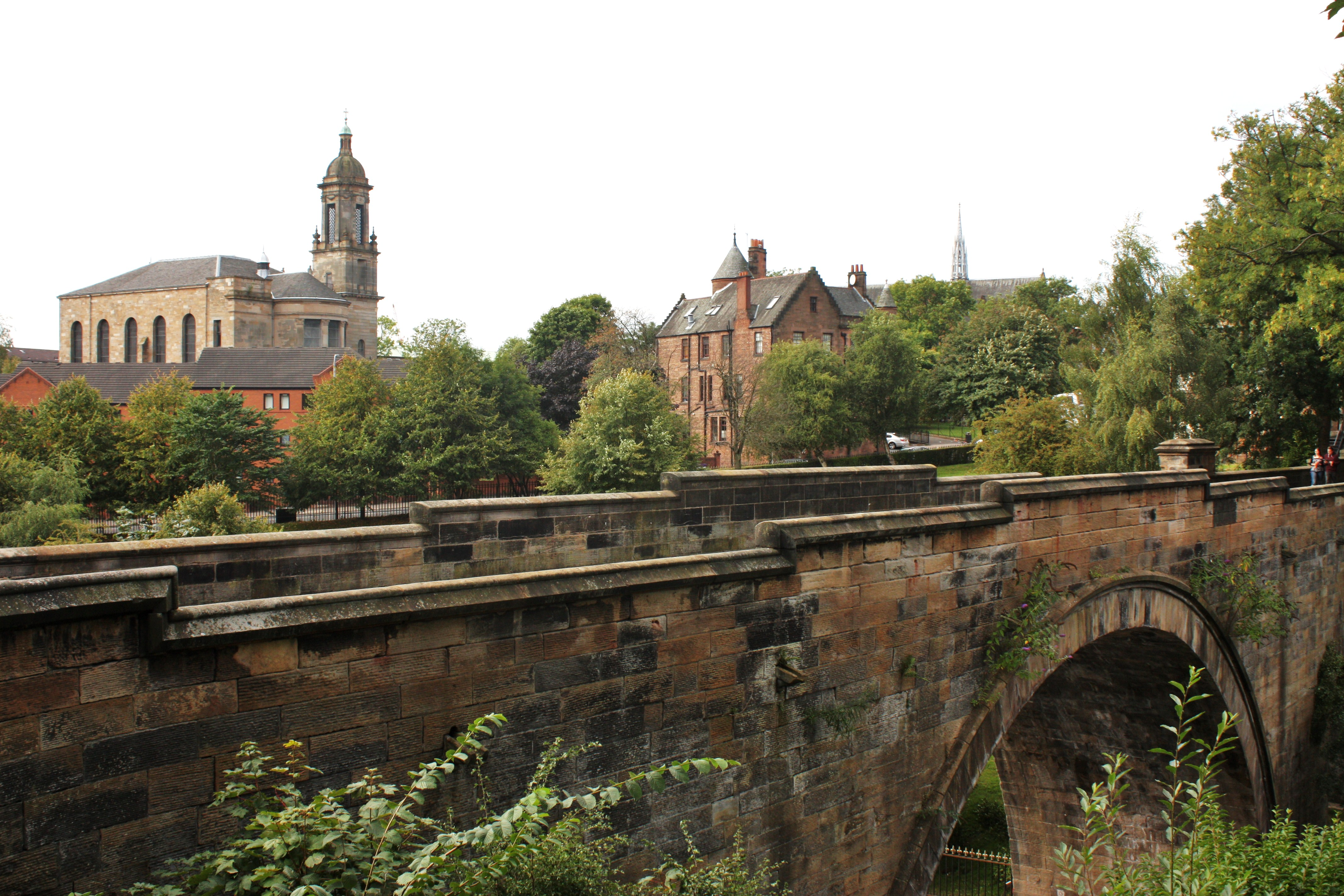
The Bridge of Sighs - looking to Cathedral Square, Glasgow

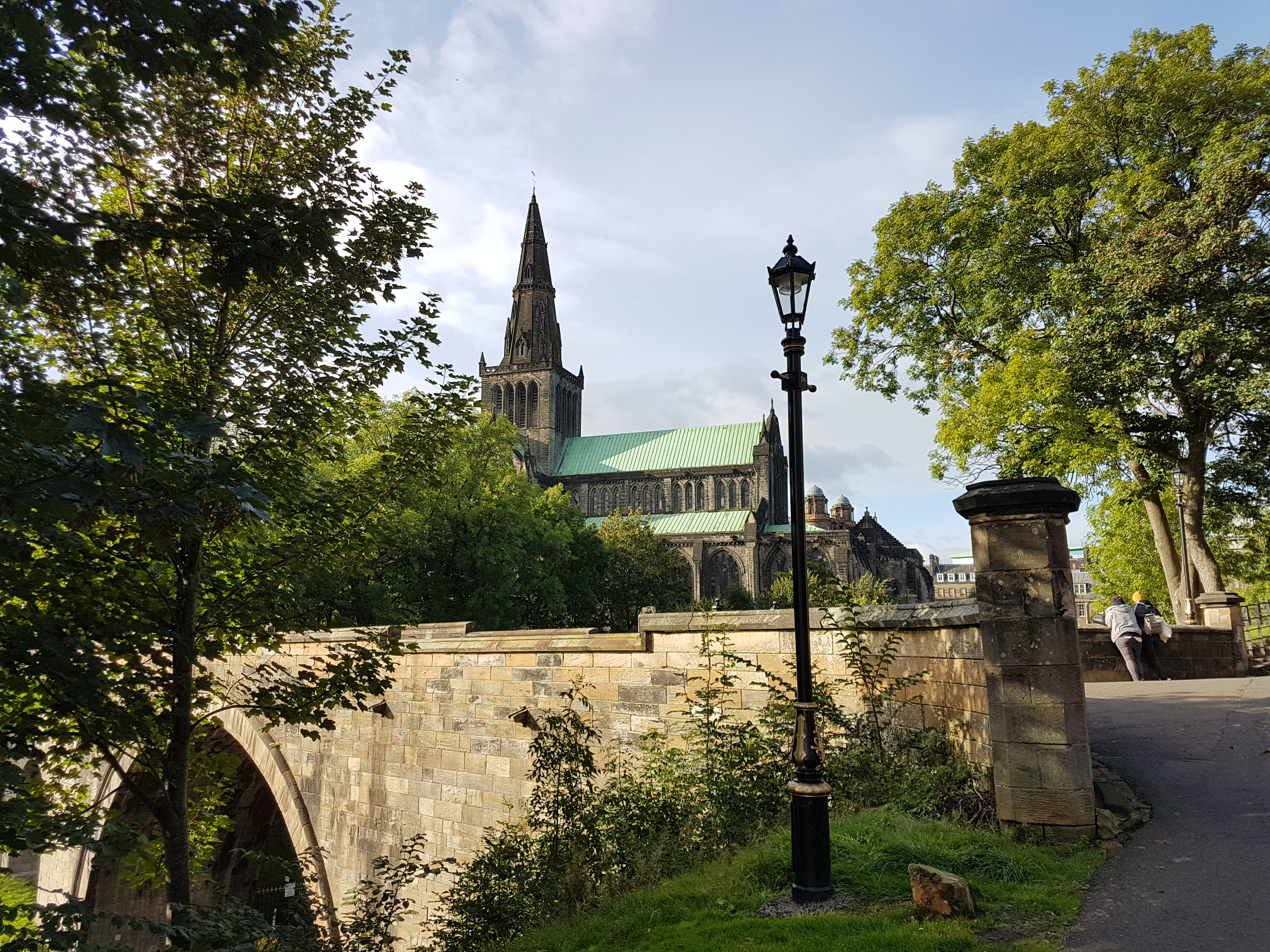
Glasgow Cathedral from the Bridge Of Sighs

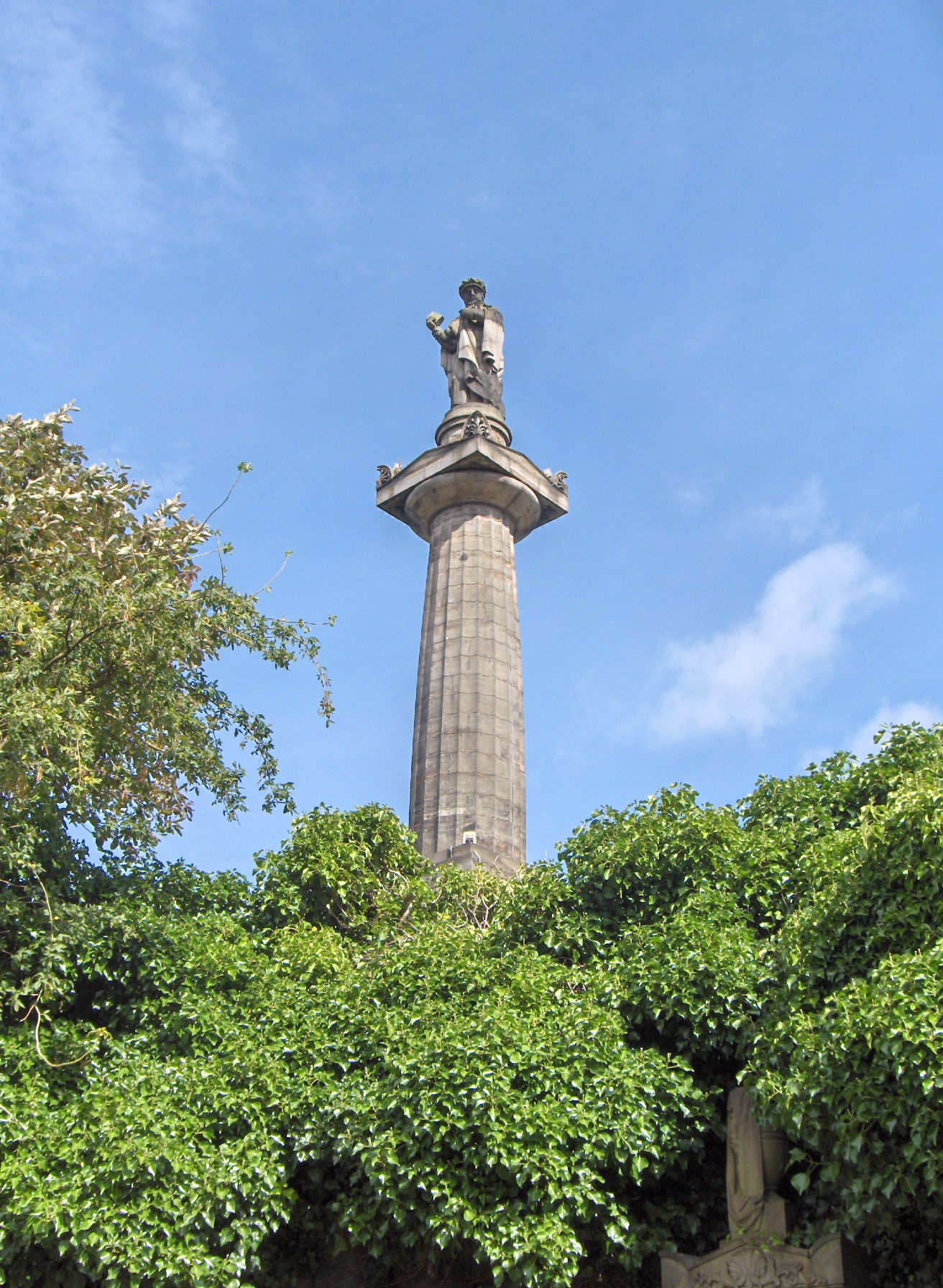
John Knox memorial statue on the top of the Necropolis, Glasgow

Cathedral Square is a public square in the city of Glasgow, Scotland. Cathedral Square and precinct is situated adjacent to Glasgow Cathedral on High Street/Castle Street at John Knox Street. Nearby are many famous Glasgow landmarks such as Provand's Lordship, Glasgow Royal Infirmary, the Necropolis, the ceremonial Barony Hall of Strathclyde University, and the Glasgow Evangelical Church at the Square. It is one of six public squares and precincts in the city centre.

Prior to the 1870s the post-medieval clutter of congested dwellings and workshops, on the remaining debris of the long-gone Bishop's Castle, where Castle Street is today, hampered access to the Infirmary, with its small Infirmary Square, and Cathedral. The new City Improvement Trust, under architect and city superintendent John Carrick, started to clear the hovels near Glasgow Cross and erect new tenements up the High Street and Castle Street. A new road, John Knox Street, was opened, curving its way past the Necropolis entrances and down to Duke Street, close to Wellpark Brewery at the Drygate. The street covered over the Molendinar Burn. Cathedral Square Gardens opened in 1879 was formed by Carrick and landscaped by Duncan McMillan. In 1890 a decorative fountain, the Steven Fountain, was placed in the centre, the same year as the Doulton Fountain in Glasgow Green. As well as being a restful place the square has been used for political gatherings.

== Buildings of the area ==
Prominent buildings of the area include:

- Glasgow Evangelical Church, 1880, Category A listed building with its elegant Italian facade and handsome classical interiors designed by architect John Honeyman of Honeyman and Keppie, as Cathedral Square United Presbyterian/Barony North Church
- Discharged Prisoners Aid Society (now Cathedral House Hotel), 1896, red sandstone building designed by architects Campbell Douglas and Morison
- Barony Hall, 1889, category A listed red sandstone building designed by Sir John James Burnet as the New Barony Church, with its interior loosely modelled on Gerona Cathedral.
- Provand's Lordship, oldest dwellings in Glasgow, Category A listed.
- Glasgow Royal Infirmary reconstructed from 1914, architect James Miller, and onwards. On the site of the Robert Adam building of 1794
- Glasgow Cathedral, the oldest building in Glasgow, from the late 12c onwards. Category A listed.
- Necropolis garden cemetery opened in 1833 on the Merchants' Park above the Cathedral.
- St Mungo Museum of Religious Life and Art and Friends Visitor Centre, opened in 1993, designed by architect Ian Begg, sitting in the centre of the Victorian square.

== Statues of the area ==
There are various statues and monuments in the area including:

- King William (joint monarch with his wife Queen Mary) from 1688. From the foundry of Can't & Lindsay, 1735. At Glasgow Cross until 1923.
- Rev Dr Norman McLeod, minister of the Barony. Sculptor John Mossman, 1881.
- David Livingstone, physician, missionary, explorer. Sculptor John Mossman, 1879. At George Square until 1956.
- James Arthur, clothing manufacturer and philanthropist. Sculptor George Anderson Lawson, 1893.
- James Lumsden, stationery manufacturer, Lord Provost, and Royal Infirmary treasurer. Sculptor John Mossman, 1862.
- James White, chemicals manufacturer and philanthropist Sculptor Francis Leslie, 1890.
- Queen Victoria, monarch from 1837 to 1901. Sculptor Albert Hemstock Hodge, 1914.
- John Knox, theologian, minister, reformer. Designer T Hamilton, carver Robert Forrest, 1825.

In the late 1890s the sprawling Duke Street Prison planned to open a new entrance and building at the edge of the square. The plans caused "indignation meetings" and a successful campaign to save the green space. Counter arguments appeared in local newspapers including an anonymous poem in the Glasgow Evening Post.: "We love it, and who shall dare. To chide us for loving Cathedral Square? We’ve cherished it long as a sacred place, We’ve shown it to strangers of every race. 'Tis bound by a thousand ties to our hearts, And we add to its treasures in fits and starts. Would you learn the spell? St. Mungo dwelt there, a sacred space Cathedral Square!"
