= Scott Monument, Glasgow =

Public monument in Glasgow

Coordinates: 55°51′40″N 4°15′01″W

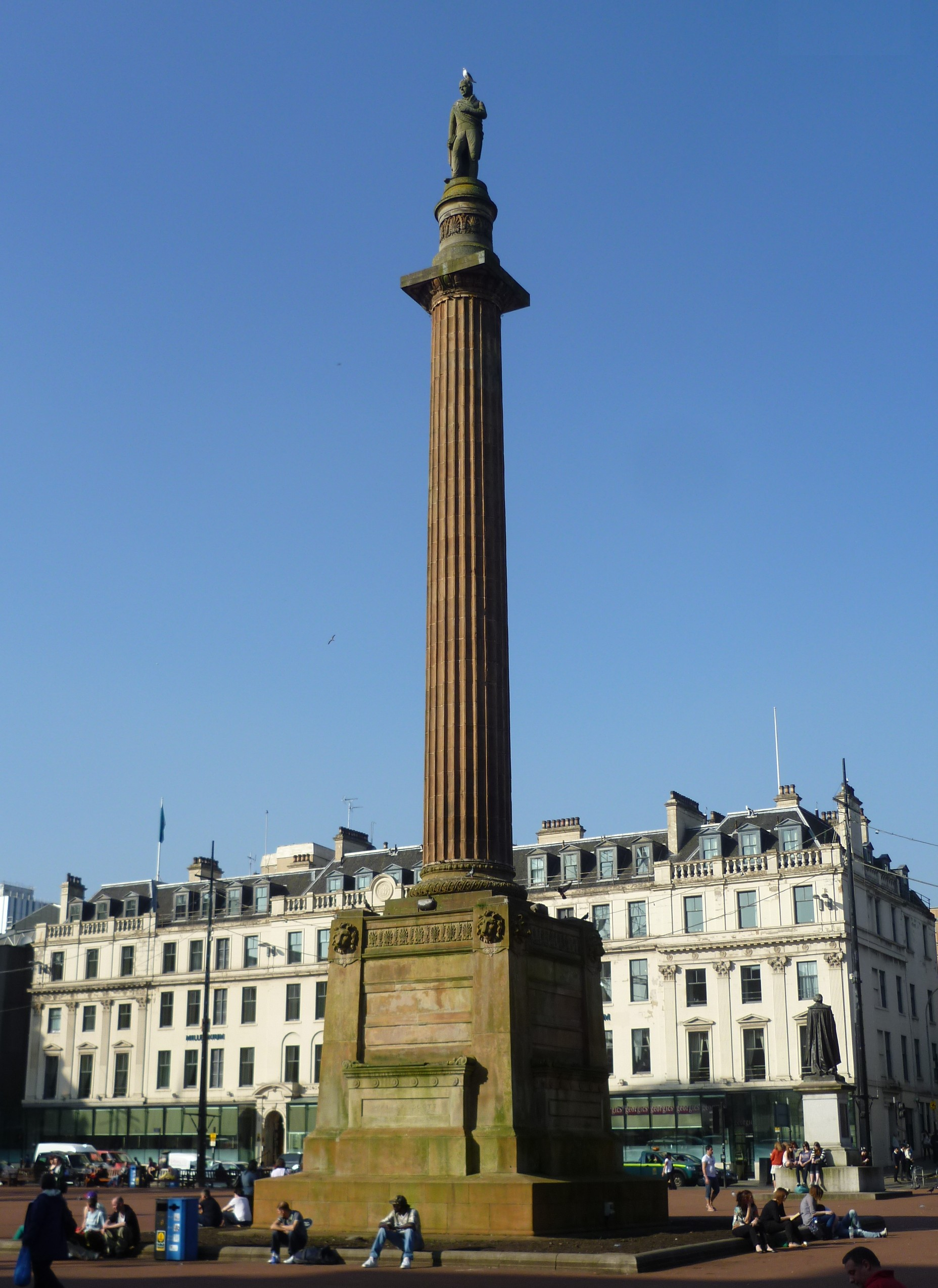
The Scott Monument in 2012

The Scott Monument is a monument pillar located in George Square the Scottish city of Glasgow. A Doric column designed by the architect David Rhind, it is topped by a statue designed by the sculptor John Greenshields.

It commemorates the Scottish writer Sir Walter Scott, a major figure of the Romantic movement known for his poems and historical Waverley novels. Prominent during the Regency era, he organised the Visit of George IV to Scotland in 1822. Commissioned in the aftermath of Scott's death in 1832, its foundation stone was laid on 2 October, 1837, although the stone for Scott's statue was not delivered to its sculptor in Edinburgh until April, 1838.

== See also ==
- Scott Monument, a near contemporary monument in Edinburgh

== Bibliography ==
- Coleman, James. Remembering the Past in Nineteenth-Century Scotland: Commemoration, Nationality and Memory. Edinburgh University Press, 2014.
- Rigney, Ann. The Afterlives of Walter Scott: Memory on the Move. Oxford University Press, 2012.
