= Clyde (ship) =

Several ships have been named Clyde for the River Clyde:

- Clyde (1802 ship) was launched at Calcutta and made one voyage to England for the British East India Company before she was lost in 1804 on the way to China.
- Clyde (1820 ship) was built at Greenock, Scotland. She made two voyages for the British East India Company and three voyages transporting convicts from England and Ireland to Australia. She is last listed in 1845.
- Clyde (1871 ship) was built at Scotstoun, Scotland. Was wrecked in 1879 while serving as a troopship for the Anglo-Zulu War
- Clyde (1894 ship) was the last ship built for the Nourse Line and was primarily used for the transportation of Indian indentured labourers to the colonies. She was eventually sold to Norwegian owners and broken up in 1924.

== See also ==
- Clyde (disambiguation)
- HMS Clyde – one of ten vessels by that name that have served the British Royal Navy
- USS Clyde
