= Clyde =

Clyde may refer to:

== People and fictional characters ==
- Clyde (given name), a list of people and fictional characters
- Clyde (surname), including a list of people
- Walt Frazier (born 1945), American basketball player nicknamed "Clyde"
- Colin Campbell, 1st Baron Clyde (1792–1863), Scottish field marshal
- James Avon Clyde, Lord Clyde (1863–1944), Scottish Conservative politician and judge
- James Latham Clyde, Lord Clyde (1898–1975), Scottish Unionist politician and judge
- James Clyde, Baron Clyde (1932–2009), Scottish judge in the House of Lords

== Places ==
=== Australia ===
- Clyde, New South Wales, a suburb of Sydney
- Clyde County, New South Wales, a cadastral division
- Clyde, Victoria, a suburb of Melbourne
- Clyde River, New South Wales
- Clyde River (Tasmania)
- Electoral district of Clyde, a former electoral district of the Legislative Assembly

=== Canada ===
- Clyde, Alberta, a village
- Clyde, Ontario, a town in Waterloo
- Clyde Township, a geographic township in the municipality of Dysart et al, Ontario
- Clyde River (Alberta)
- Clyde River (Baffin Island)
- Clyde River (Ontario), in eastern Ontario

=== New Zealand ===
- Clyde, New Zealand, a town
- Clyde Dam, near the town
- Clyde River (New Zealand)

=== Scotland ===
- River Clyde
- Firth of Clyde

=== United States ===
- Clyde, California, a census-designated place
- Clyde, Georgia, a ghost town
- Clyde Township, Whiteside County, Illinois
- Clyde, Iowa, an unincorporated community
- Clyde, Kansas, a city
- Clyde, Michigan, an unincorporated community
- Clyde Township, Allegan County, Michigan
- Clyde Township, St. Clair County, Michigan
- Clyde, Missouri, a village
- Clyde, New Jersey, an unincorporated community
- Clyde, New York, a village
- Clyde, North Carolina, an unincorporated community
- Clyde, North Dakota, an unincorporated community
- Clyde, Ohio, a city
- Clyde, Pennsylvania, an unincorporated area
- Clyde, South Carolina, an unincorporated community
- Clyde, Texas, a city
- Clyde, Wisconsin, a town
- Clyde (community), Iowa County, Wisconsin, an unincorporated community
- Clyde, Kewaunee County, Wisconsin, an unincorporated community
- Lake Corcoran, also known as Lake Clyde, California
- Clyde River (New York), a tributary of the Seneca River
- Clyde River (Vermont), a tributary of Lake Memphremagog

== Business ==
- Clyde & Co, a global law firm headquartered in London
- Clyde Engineering, a defunct Australian manufacturer of locomotives, rolling stock, and other industrial products
- Clyde Iron Works, a Scottish-based ironworking plant from 1786 to 1978
- Clyde Steamship Company, a defunct American transportation company
- WW Clyde, a heavy construction company based in Orem, Utah, US
- Puma Clyde, a line of shoes released by Puma in 1973
- Clyde Hotel, Portland, Oregon, US

== Education ==
- Clyde Engineering Building, Brigham Young University
- Clyde School, a private girls' school in Macedon, Victoria, Australia
- Clyde High School (Ohio), Clyde, Ohio, US
- Clyde High School (Texas), Clyde, Texas, US

== Entertainment ==
- "Clyde" (song), by J. J. Cale from Naturally
- C.L.Y.D.E., a Canadian-French animated television series

== Navy ==
- HMNB Clyde, a Royal Navy base at Faslane, Scotland
- HMS Clyde, various Royal Navy ships
- USS Clyde, two ships

== Transportation ==
- Clyde (ship), several ships of this name
- Clyde-class lifeboat, operated by the Royal National Lifeboat Institution between 1968 and 1988
- Clyde railway station, Sydney, Australia
- Clyde railway station, Victoria, Australia
- Clyde station (Illinois), a former commuter rail station in Cicero, Illinois, US
- Clyde Metro, a proposed multimodal mass-transit system centred on the city of Glasgow, Scotland
- Clyde Road, Dublin, Ireland
- Clyde Tunnel, running under the River Clyde in Glasgow
- Clyde Walkway, Glasgow
- Rolls-Royce Clyde, an early turboprop engine

== Other uses ==
- Clyde F.C., a Scottish football club
- Clyde (mascot), official mascot of the 2014 Commonwealth Games in Glasgow
- Clyde oil field, in the North Sea
- Clyde (turkey), a turkey annually pardoned on Thanksgiving by the governor of Alabama

== See also ==
- Port Clyde, Maine, US
- Port Clyde, Nova Scotia, Canada
- The Clydes, an American rock band
- Clyde's Restaurant Group, an American company which owns and runs 12 restaurants
- Clyde's (play), 2021, by Lynn Nottage
