= Clyde (given name) =

Clyde is a given name. It may refer to:

== People ==
- Clyde Alwood (1895–1954), American college basketball player
- Clyde Alves, Canadian dancer, actor and singer
- Clyde Arbuckle (1903–1998), American historian
- Clyde Arwood (1901–1943), American man executed in Tennessee
- Clyde Ballard (born 1936), American businessman and former politician
- Clyde Barnhart (1895–1980), American baseball player
- Clyde Barfoot (1891–1971), American baseball player
- Clyde Barrow (1909–1934), of the infamous American criminal duo Bonnie and Clyde
- Clyde Beatty (1903–1965), American animal trainer and circus impresario
- Clyde F. Bel Jr. (c. 1932 – 2014), American politician
- Clyde Bellecourt (1936–2022), Native American civil rights activist
- Clyde Bernhardt (1905–1986), American jazz trumpeter
- Clyde Best (born 1951), Bermudian football player
- Clyde Berry (1931–2023), American football and baseball player and coach
- Clyde Billington Jr. (1934–2018), American chemist, businessman, and politician
- Clyde Bishop (born 1942), American diplomat
- Cyle Brink (born 1994), South African rugby union player
- Clyde Bruckman (1894–1955), American screenwriter and film director
- Clyde Cameron (1913–2008), Australian politician
- Clyde Carson (born 1981), American rapper
- Clyde Carr (1886–1962), New Zealand politician and minister
- Clyde A. Curtin (1920–2011), United States flying ace
- Clyde Davenport (1921–2020), American old-time fiddler and banjo player
- Clyde Drexler (born 1962), American basketball player
- Clyde A. Duniway (1866–1944), American educator and academic administrator
- Clyde Edwards-Helaire (born 1999), American football player
- Clyde Fenton (1901–1982), Northern Territory's first flying doctor
- Clyde Fitch (1865–1909), American dramatist
- Clyde Foster (1931–2017), American scientist and mathematician
- Clyde Geronimi (1901–1989), Italian-American animation director
- Clyde Lee Giles, American computer scientist
- Clyde H. Hamilton (1934–2020), American judge
- Clyde Hart (1934–2025), American athletic coach
- Clyde Hart (pianist) (1910–1945), American jazz pianist and arranger
- Clyde Holding (1931–2011), Australian politician
- Clyde Howdy (1921–1969), American actor and stuntman
- Clyde A. Hutchison III, American biochemist and microbiologist
- Clyde King (1924–2010), American baseball pitcher
- Clyde Kluckhohn (1905–1960), American anthropologist
- Clyde Kusatsu (born 1948), Japanese-American actor
- Clyde Lovellette (1929–2016), American basketball player
- Clyde Lucas (c. 1901–1982), American big-band leader
- Clyde T. Lusk (1932–2014), Vice admiral in the United States Coast Guard
- Clyde A. Lynch (1891–1950), American pastor, professor, and president of Lebanon Valley College
- Clyde McCoy (1903–1990), American jazz trumpeter
- Clyde McPhatter (1932–1972), American R&B singer
- Clyde Milan (1887–1953), American baseball player
- Clyde M. Narramore (1916–2015), American author
- Clyde O'Connell (born 1998), Irish professional footballer
- Clyde Otis (1924–2008), American songwriter
- Clyde Packer (1935–2001), Australian businessman and politician
- Clyde Palmer (1923–2005), American racing driver
- Clyde Prickett (born 1932), American racing driver
- Clyde Reasinger (1927–2018), American jazz trumpeter
- Clyde Rimple (1937–2022), Trinidad and Tobago cyclist
- Clyde Sefton (born 1951), Australian road cyclist
- Clyde Stacy (1936–2013), American singer
- Clyde E. Stone (1876–1948), American jurist
- Clyde Sukeforth (1901–2000), American baseball pitcher
- Clyde Summers (1918–2010), American labor lawyer and law professor at the University of Pennsylvania Law School
- Clyde A. Thomason (1914–1942), U.S. Marine and posthumous Medal of Honor recipient
- Clyde V. Tisdale (1890–1975), American politician
- Clyde Tolson (1900–1975), Associate Director of the FBI
- Clyde Tombaugh (1906–1997), American astronomer, discoverer of Pluto
- Clyde A. Vaughn (born 1946), United States Army general
- Clyde De Vinna (1890–1953), American film cinematographer, winner for "White Shadows on the South Seas" in 1929
- Clyde Wahrhaftig (1919–1994), American geologist
- Clyde Walcott (1926–2006), West Indian cricketer
- Clyde Kirby Wells (born 1937), Canadian Queen's Counsel, the fifth Premier of Newfoundland
- Clyde Wright (born 1941), American baseball player
- Clyde Yancy (born 1958), American cardiologist
- Clyde Zoia (1896–1955), American football player

== Fictional characters ==
- Clyde Bunny, cartoon character who appears in three Looney Tunes shorts
- Clyde Crashcup, character from The Alvin Show
- Clyde Donovan, a recurring character from South Park
- Clyde Griffiths, the protagonist of An American Tragedy
- Clyde Handforth, a supporting character in the 2011 video game LittleBigPlanet 2
- Clyde Langer, character from the television show The Sarah Jane Adventures
- Clyde McBride, character from the television show The Loud House
- Clyde Wyncham, fictional character appearing in comic books published by Marvel Comics
- Clyde, one of the members of Tori Amos' American Doll Posse
- Clyde the orangutan from Every Which Way but Loose
- Clyde, the orange ghost in the Pac-Man series
- Clyde, an animated mobster inspired by Clyde Barrow who led the Ant Hill Mob in Wacky Races and The Perils of Penelope Pitstop
- Clyde, a character from Tom & Jerry Kids
- Clyde (mascot), the official mascot of the 2014 Commonwealth Games
- Clyde, character from 1992 Moonlite Software computer game Clyde's Adventure and its 1995 sequel Clyde's Revenge
- Clyde, a character in the 2009 video game Arc Rise Fantasia
- Clyde, also known as Experiment 150, an alien character from Disney's Lilo & Stitch franchise

== See also ==
- Clyde (surname)
- Clyde (disambiguation)
