= USS Batfish (SS-310) =

Submarine of the United States

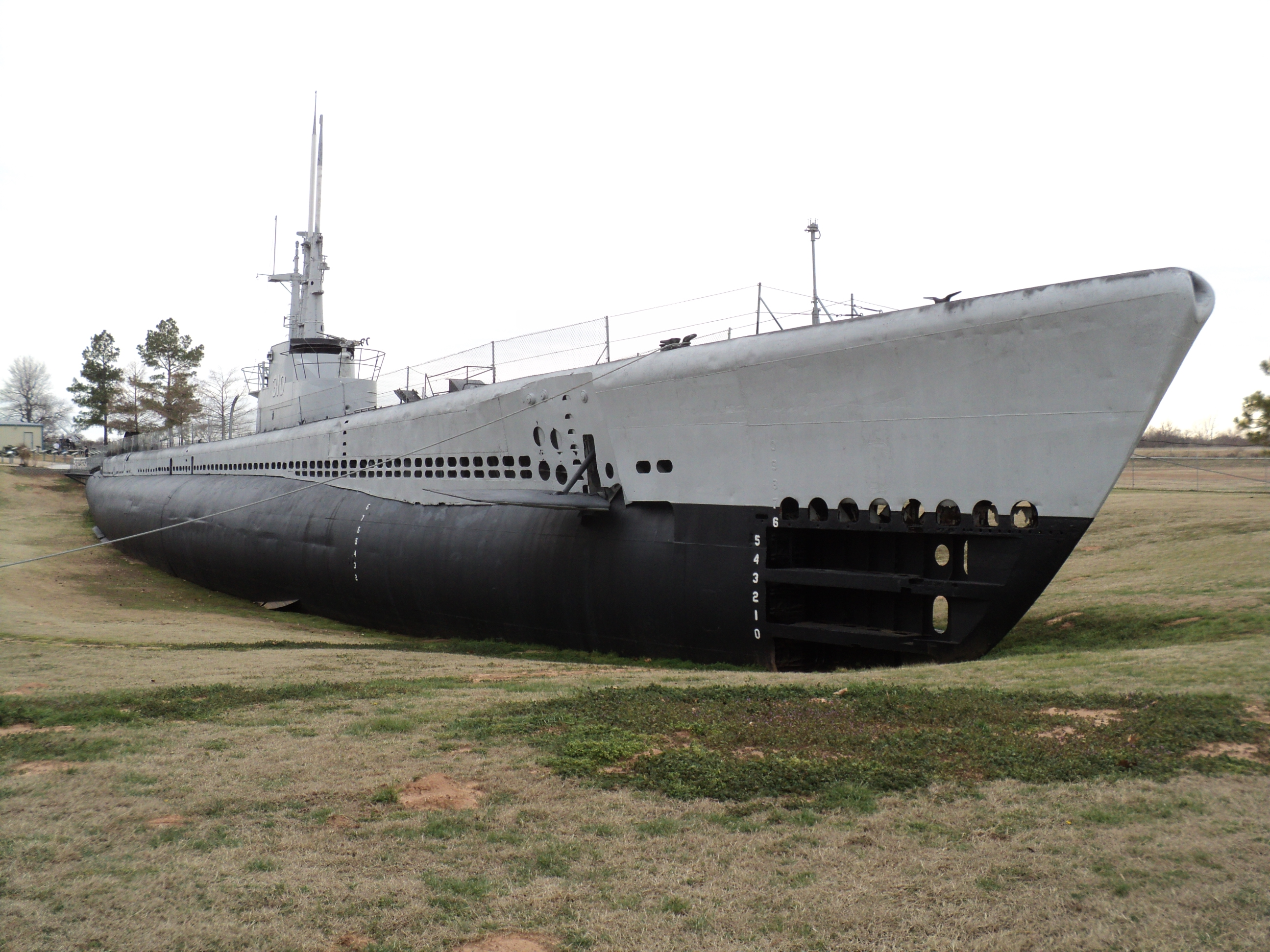
- USS Batfish (SS-310) at Muskogee, Oklahoma.

History

United States
- Name: Batfish
- Namesake: Batfish
- Ordered: 21 April 1942
- Builder: Portsmouth Naval Shipyard, Kittery, Maine
- Laid down: 27 December 1942
- Launched: 5 May 1943
- Sponsored by: Mrs. Nellie W. Fortier
- Commissioned: 21 August 1943
- Decommissioned: 6 April 1946
- Recommissioned: 7 March 1952
- Decommissioned: 1 November 1969
- Stricken: 1 November 1969
- Honors and awards: Presidential Unit Citation and 6 battle stars for World War II
- Status: Museum ship in Muskogee, Oklahoma, 18 February 1972
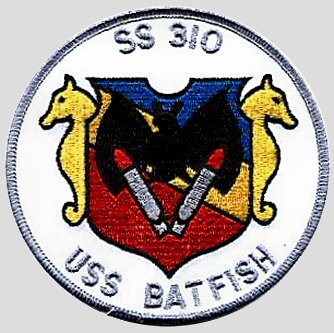
- Badge

General characteristics
- Class & type: Balao class diesel-electric submarine
- Displacement: 1,470 long tons (1,490 t) surfaced; 2,040 long tons (2,070 t) submerged
- Length: 311 ft 6 in (94.95 m)
- Beam: 27 ft 3 in (8.31 m)
- Draft: 16 ft 10 in (5.13 m) maximum
- Propulsion: 4 × Fairbanks-Morse Model 38D8-1/8 9-cylinder opposed-piston diesel engines driving electrical generators; 2 × 126-cell Sargo batteries; 4 × high-speed Elliott electric motors with reduction gears; 2 × propellers; 5,400 shp (4.0 MW) surfaced; 2,740 shp (2.04 MW) submerged
- Speed: 20.25 knots (38 km/h) surfaced; 8.75 knots (16 km/h) submerged
- Range: 11,000 nautical miles (20,000 km) surfaced at 10 knots (19 km/h)
- Endurance: 48 hours at 2 knots (3.7 km/h) submerged; 75 days on patrol
- Test depth: 400 ft (120 m)
- Complement: 10 officers, 68 enlisted
- Armament: 10 × 21-inch (533 mm) torpedo tubes; 6 forward, 4 aft; 24 torpedoes; 1 × 5-inch (127 mm) / 25 caliber deck gun; Bofors 40 mm and Oerlikon 20 mm cannon

The first USS Batfish (SS/AGSS-310) is a Balao-class submarine, known primarily for sinking three Imperial Japanese Navy submarines, Ro-55, Ro-112, and Ro-113, in a 76-hour period, in February 1945. USS Batfish is the first vessel of the United States Navy to be named for the batfish, a type of anglerfish that crawls about on the sea floor.

Batfish served during World War II. Her war operations spanned a period from 11 December 1943 to 26 August 1945, during which she completed seven war patrols. She is credited with having sunk nine Japanese ships totaling 10,658 tons while operating east of Japan and in the Philippine Sea, Luzon Strait, and South China Sea. Batfish received the Presidential Unit Citation for her sixth war patrol during which she sank three Japanese submarines in the South China Sea in four days.

Following the end of World War II, she was decommissioned on April 6, 1946 and laid up as a training vessel in the Pacific Reserve Fleet. She received a reactivation overhaul in January 1952 before she was recommissioned on March 7, 1952 and assigned to Submarine Division 122 in the United States Atlantic Fleet taking part in training operations in the Caribbean and along the East Coast of the United States. She was decommissioned for the final time on August 4, 1958 and assigned to the Charleston Group of the Atlantic Reserve Fleet. In the Summer of 1959, she was assigned as a United States Naval Reserve training vessel at New Orleans, Louisiana where she was redesignated as an "auxiliary research submarine" (AGSS-310). She continued to serve at New Orleans until she was laid up in the Atlantic Reserve Fleet and her name was struck from the Naval Vessel Registry on November, 1 1969. Following a brief time in the reserve fleet she was donated to the Oklahoma Maritime Advisory Board and moved to Muskogee, Oklahoma and opened in 1973 as a museum ship.

== Construction and commissioning ==
Originally to be named Acoupa, hull SS-310 was renamed Batfish on 24 September 1942 prior to its keel laying on 27 December 1942 at the Portsmouth Naval Shipyard in Kittery, Maine. She was launched on 5 May 1943, sponsored by Mrs. Nellie W. Fortier, and commissioned on 21 August 1943 with Lieutenant Commander Wayne R. Merrill in command.

== Service history ==
=== World War II ===
Following her commissioning, Batfish underwent an extensive shakedown and training period to instruct the crew in combat procedures for diving, attacking, evading, and damage control. She left the Portsmouth Navy Yard in mid-September 1943, paused briefly at Newport, Rhode Island, to practice on the torpedo range, and then continued on to New London, Connecticut. She arrived there on 26 September 1943 and, after voyage repairs, underwent additional training in submarine combat routine.

Batfish left New London on 15 October to join the war in the Pacific. While still northeast of the Panama Canal, Batfish sighted another submarine and, believing it to be a German U-boat, fired a torpedo at it. The torpedo missed, and the other submarine disappeared.

Just as Batfish approached the Panama Canal, a U.S. Navy patrol bomber mistook her for a U-boat and almost dropped its bombload on her. On 1 November 1943, Batfish tied up at Coco Solo in the Panama Canal Zone for an overnight stop, then transited the canal and spent a week in Balboa on the Pacific end of the canal for minor repairs and rest.

On 8 November 1943, Batfish resumed her journey, making an independent voyage during which her crew conducted daily drills. She arrived in Pearl Harbor, Hawaii, on 19 November 1943. After reporting for duty to the Commander, Submarine Force, U.S. Pacific Fleet, Batfish spent five days alongside the submarine tender USS Griffin (AS-13) at Pearl Harbor for repairs. She then carried out intensive training in United States Pacific Fleet procedures.

==== First war patrol ====
Batfish left Pearl Harbor on 11 December 1943 and began her first war patrol, an open-sea patrol south of Honshu, Japan. She fought typhoons most of the way but finally reached her patrol area on 28 December 1943. However, bad weather continued to dog her operations and made it impossible for her to attack the few Japanese convoys she sighted. On 14 January 1944, her radar picked up a large contact. Signals intelligence identified it as the Imperial Japanese Navy battleship Yamato, one of the two largest warships in the world. Merrill chose to dive rather than use the cover of the heavy seas to close the battleship on the surface, and Batfish′s slower submerged speed caused her to fall rapidly out of range of Yamato and her escorts.

Shortly after 12:00 on 19 January 1944, a convoy of four Japanese ships appeared on the horizon and, with nightfall, Batfish made a high-speed surface run to close for an attack. She fired three torpedoes at each of two cargo ships, sinking one and crippling the other. The other two ships escaped, but Batfish remained on the scene to sink the crippled cargo ship, the 5,486-gross register ton Hidaka Maru, early the following morning. Postwar assessment of Japanese shipping losses only credited Batfish with this last sinking.

Batfish departed her patrol area on 24 January 1944 and headed back through typhoons to Midway Atoll in the Northwestern Hawaiian Islands, where she arrived on 30 January 1944. At Midway, she underwent a two-week refit, followed by a week of training.

==== Second war patrol ====
Batfish departed Midway Atoll on 22 February 1944 bound for another patrol area south of Honshu. This patrol was unsuccessful because of continual high winds and heavy seas that seemed to have kept the Japanese in port. Batfish departed her patrol area on 3 April 1944 without making contact with any ship larger than a sampan. She proceeded to Pearl Harbor for refit, which began upon her arrival there on 15 April 1944. A relief crew from the submarine tender USS Proteus (AS-19) took over to allow Batfish′s crew two weeks of rest. The refit was extended, but finally, on 10 May 1944, Batfish departed Pearl Harbor for Midway Atoll and additional training. While she was at Midway, Lieutenant Commander John K. "Jake" Fyfe relieved Merrill of command.

==== Third war patrol ====
On 26 May 1944, Batfish departed Midway Atoll to patrol an area covering the southern coasts of Kyushu, Shikoku, and Honshu. The weather was excellent. On 10 June 1944, she attacked and thought she had sunk a Japanese cargo ship in use as a training ship, but the kill was not confirmed. Retaliatory depth-charge attacks by Japanese planes and patrol boats failed to damage Batfish, and she continued her patrol. On 18 June 1944 she sighted two Japanese ships, a coastal cargo ship and a small, but heavily laden, tanker. Although within sight of the coast of Honshu, Batfish closed in for the kill and claimed to have sunk the cargo ship.

On 22 June 1944, Batfish sighted a large Japanese cargo ship steaming independently down the Japanese coast. She fired three of her bow torpedo tubes at the ship, but all three passed astern of her. As the first target rounded Andakino Point and headed away, a larger Japanese cargo ship, Nagaragawa Maru, passed her on an opposite course. Batfish fired four torpedoes from her stern tubes at Nagaragawa Maru, allowing her to make a quick escape out to sea. Nagaragawa Maru sank by the stern. However, a Japanese patrol boat immediately gave chase to Batfish, forcing her to dive to avoid depth charges. Unfortunately, Batfish′s nautical charts were not accurate: They showed depths of 400 feet (122 m) in the area, but Batfish grounded on an underwater volcanic peak at a depth of 240 feet (73 m). Batfish rapidly eased backwards and upwards, but endured a tense eight hours punctuated by more than 50 depth charges before she could surface and survey her damage. The depth charges had caused none, but the grounding had jammed the starboard sound head, reducing her underwater listening capabilities, and had bent the starboard propeller shaft and propeller.

Nevertheless, Batfish continued her patrol. She sighted a Japanese convoy on 28 June 1944, but before she could reach a suitable attack position, the Japanese attacked her with torpedoes and aerial bombs, forcing her to let the convoy escape. However, she picked up another contact on 29 June 1944, a Japanese convoy with a cargo ship as a prime target. Batfish fired three torpedoes from her bow tubes that missed their mark when the Japanese maneuvered to avoid them. This convoy also made good its escape.

On 2 July 1944, as Batfish departed her patrol area bound for Midway Atoll, a lookout sighted two Japanese ships, a small trawler traveling with a converted yacht serving as an escort. Batfish closed in for a surface attack, and her guns filled the trawler with holes but failed to trigger an explosion. The escort moved at high speed to ram Batfish, which backed at emergency speed and narrowly avoided a collision. Full of holes from Batfish′s raking gunfire, the converted yacht was engulfed in flames and quickly sank. Batfish suffered one casualty, the pharmacist's mate, who was hit by a bullet in the knee while at his post on deck in the surface gun action that ended in the destruction of what proved to be the guard boats Kamoi Maru and No. 5 Isuzugawa Maru.

Batfish returned to Midway Atoll, where she underwent a 16-day refit alongside Proteus. Her crew then trained in firing the new electric Mark 18 torpedo.

==== Fourth war patrol ====
Batfish departed Midway Atoll on 1 August 1944 for her fourth war patrol, which took her to waters surrounding the Palau Islands. Her assigned area offered up no worthy targets, but a report of a Japanese destroyer grounded to the north of the Palaus sent her to Velasco Reef to investigate. There, she found two Japanese ships – minelayer and a transport – aground on the reef and the Japanese destroyer Samidare on the beach across the atoll where it had run aground on 18 August 1944. A Japanese floatplane, two tugs, two patrol boats, and a minesweeper that Batfish identified as a second destroyer were in attendance. Batfish selected the transport as her first target, but poor visibility, rain, and rough seas intervened. On 23 August 1944, while making an approach to locate the transport again in a rain squall, Batfish found the minesweeper, which her crew still believed to be a destroyer, in her sights instead. She fired three torpedoes from her bow tubes that hit the warship and blew her apart at 8°09′N 134°38′E. Japanese records later identified the ship as Minesweeper No. 22. On 26 August 1944, Batfish damaged Samidare beyond repair with two torpedo hits at 08°30′N 134°37′E and later witnessed the Japanese completing the destruction of Samidare with demolition charges.

Called away from Velasco Reef by orders to stand lifeguard duty off Peleliu between 27 and 29 August 1944 during air strikes on Peleliu and nearby Koror, Batfish did not return to Velasco Reef until two days before her departure from the patrol area. One Japanese ship still lay high and dry on the reef, but closer inspection revealed her to be already beyond salvage. Batfish chased a Japanese minelayer for 90 minutes, but it outmaneuvered her and escaped.

On 3 September 1944, Batfish headed for refit at Fremantle, Australia. She arrived at Fremantle on 12 September 1944, and the submarine tender USS Griffin (AS-13) provided a relief crew to begin the refit, while Batfish′s own crew relaxed in Perth in Western Australia.

==== Fifth war patrol ====
Escorted by the Royal Australian Navy corvette HMAS Parkes, Batfish departed Fremantle on 8 October 1944 and proceeded with the submarine USS Guitarro (SS-363) to Exmouth Gulf on the coast of Western Australia for refueling. On 11 October 1944, two hours after leaving Exmouth Gulf, a periscope jammed in the fully raised position and defied the crew's efforts to correct the problem. Batfish proceeded to Darwin, Australia, for emergency repairs alongside the submarine rescue ship USS Coucal (ASR-8). Finally, on 17 October 1944, Batfish headed out on her fifth war patrol, although chronic engineering problems plagued her throughout the patrol.

On 19 October 1944, Batfish picked up a radar contact – one large ship, which Batfish later identified as a tanker, with two escorts. When close enough, Batfish fired a salvo of six torpedoes, but all passed under the target. Surprisingly, the tanker and escorts took no evasive action, and Batfish closed for another attack. She fired a single torpedo set at a very shallow depth, but it too passed under the target, although it hit an escort on the other side. Batfish continued the pursuit because tankers had been deemed a high-priority target because of their vital role in supplying of petroleum to Japan. She closed for a surface attack, but at a range of 5,500 yards (5,030 m), the target suddenly turned to attack. She was a "Q ship," a heavily armed decoy for unwary Allied submarines, capable of speeds of 20 knots (37 km/h; 23 mph). The Q-ship attacked at Batfish with 4-inch (102 mm) guns and depth charges. Batfish dived and steadied up somewhere between her test depth and her crush depth to hide. After several hours, she began to withdraw from the area and slowly rose to the surface, where she found herself alone.

Batfish′s delays in Australia and the hide-and-seek game with the Q-ship caused her to miss the invasion of the Philippines at Leyte on 20 October 1944, which began both the Philippines campaign of 1944–1945 and the Battle of Leyte and triggered the Battle of Leyte Gulf of 23–26 October 1944. She was assigned patrols in the Sulu Sea and the area between Mindanao and Negros Island and to the west of Luzon until 4 November 1944, when she received orders to perform lifeguard duties off Lingayen Gulf. On 6 November 1944, she sighted a Japanese 13-ship convoy including a choice target, a damaged heavy cruiser. As she approached and crept to periscope depth, she was nearly run over by a Japanese destroyer and only avoided collision by an emergency dive. Upon closing again, she fired six torpedoes from her bow tubes at a trailing transport, but all missed. Batfish was forced to dive and maneuver to evade depth charges from the convoy's escorts. On 7 November 1944, she again caught up with the convoy when it anchored in San Fernando Harbor. As she closed the crippled heavy cruiser again, the escorts gave chase and depth-charged her until she retreated.

Batfish had no further opportunities to attack Japanese ships until 14 November 1944. Then, while operating in an attack group with the submarines USS Ray (SS-271) and USS Raton (SS-270), she stalked a convoy of eight ships. After Ray and Raton had attacked, Batfish moved in and fired four torpedoes from her stern tubes that she thought sank a transport and an escort. However, these kills were not later confirmed. Soon thereafter, Batfish received orders to proceed to Pearl, and she arrived there on 1 December 1944.

==== Sixth war patrol ====
Following refit, Batfish got underway in company with the submarine USS Charr (SS-328) on 30 December 1944 for her sixth war patrol, bound for the Mariana Islands as part of an attack group which also included the submarines USS Blackfish (SS-221) and USS Archerfish (SS-311). The submarines arrived at Apra Harbor on Guam on 9 January 1945, but returned to sea on 10 January to take up patrol in the South China Sea to the northeast of Hainan Island. Early on 23 January 1945, the attack group made radar contact with a small fleet of junks. Batfish surfaced and fired at one of the larger junks, then dispatched boarding parties which searched four of the junks and found nothing but harmless Chinese fishermen aboard them. After giving the junks some supplies, Batfish resumed her patrol to the south to avoid further contact with the junks. Since Japanese convoys dwindled constantly both in size and number by this point in the war due to American advances and faltering Japanese defenses, Batfish encountered only small and isolated transports, and her attacks on them were cut short either by foul weather or by torpedoes that consistently passed under their targets.

On 2 February 1945, Batfish's patrol area changed to Babuyan and the Calayan north of Luzon. After arriving on station, she sighted a small Japanese landing barge on a northerly course heading toward Formosa and made a surface attack. She was unable to sink the barge, but started a fire on board and thoroughly raked it with gunfire before leaving it behind.

On 3 February 1945, Batfish was alerted to watch for Japanese vessels engaged in an evacuation to Formosa of Japanese personnel from the Aparri area of northern Luzon. On 4 February, Vice Admiral Shigeyoshi Miwa, the commander of Japanese 6th Fleet, ordered the submarines Ro-46, Ro-112, Ro-113, and Ro-115 to suspend their patrols, proceed to Takao on Formosa to offload torpedoes and ammunition, and then proceed to the Aparri area to embark evacuees.

After her engagement with the landing barge, Batfish made no contacts until 9 February 1945, when at 22:50 her SJ radar began tracking a blip moving at 12 knots (22 km/h; 14 mph) on a course of 310 degrees – i.e., away from Aparri and toward Formosa – at a range of 11,000 yards (10,000 m). Batfish tentatively identified it as a Japanese submarine. Using radar and sound data to determine the target's course and speed, Batfish closed with it and at 23:31 attacked with four torpedoes from her bow tubes, but all four torpedoes missed, and Batfish heard them detonate at the end of their runs. She prepared for another attack, and by 00:01 on 10 February a Japanese submarine was visible at a range of 1,020 yards (930 m) as Fyfe, alone on the bridge, guided Batfish in toward her target. At 00:02, Batfish fired four torpedoes from her bow tubes. The first malfunctioned and ran hot in the tube, the second hit the target with a brilliant red explosion, the third went through the explosion, and the fourth missed, detonating at the end of its run. Batfish subsequently heard distinct breaking-up noises and claimed the sinking of a Japanese submarine at 18°56′N 121°34′E, but the submarine's identity has never been established. Some records identify her as I-41, but I-41 was not among the submarines ordered to take part in the evacuation and apparently was sunk on 18 November 1944 in the Philippine Sea by the destroyer escorts USS Lawrence C. Taylor (DE-415) and USS Melvin R. Nawman (DE-416) and aircraft from the escort carrier USS Anzio (CVE-57). Ro-115 never acknowledged Miwa's order and never arrived at Takao, and there is no evidence that she took part in the evacuation; the destroyer escort USS Ulvert M. Moore (DE-442) probably sank her southwest of Manila on 31 January 1945. Ro-46 completed her evacuation mission successfully, and survived until at least April 1945. The Japanese submarine Ro-55, not a participant in the evacuation but at Aparri at the time to offload ammunition, is almost certainly the submarine Batfish sank. Although a submarine the destroyer escort USS Thomason (DE-203) sank on 7 February 1945 had been identified as Ro-55, evidence proves she was still afloat by 9 February 1945 when she departed for the safety of Formosa, but never reached destination due Batfish's torpedoes.

During the patrol, Fyfe noted that Batfish sighted a significant number of Japanese aircraft, but that they passed her without attempting an attack, a behavior he attributed to what he presumed was the Japanese pilots being more concerned about the large number of American planes also in the area than with Batfish. On 10 February 1945, Batfish detected approaching aircraft which she identified as a flight of four American fighters accompanying a U.S. Navy PBY Catalina flying boat. She submerged to periscope depth and established radio communications with the flight leader, but then gained sound contact on an approaching torpedo. She went to deep submergence and narrowly avoided the torpedo, which passed overhead. Fyfe assessed it as a probable friendly fire incident, in which the aircraft had mistaken her for a Japanese submarine, one of the fighters had spotted for the PBY by following Batfish down her track, and the PBY had dropped the torpedo.

At 19:51 on 11 February 1945, Batfish gained radar contact on a target at a range of 8,000 yards (7,300 m), and her radar detector picked up radar signals from it at the same time. At 20:37, when she had closed to a range of 1,300 yards (1,200 m), her lookouts identified it as another Japanese submarine. The Japanese submarine then dived suddenly at 20:43. At 21:05, Batfish′s passive sonar detected the Japanese submarine blowing her ballast tanks, and at 21:06 the Japanese vessel surfaced again and resumed her course, apparently unaware of Batfish′s presence. Batfish again gained radar contact and detected the Japanese submarine's radar at a range of 8,650 yards (7,910 m). Batfish closed the range and submerged to radar depth at 21:50 at a range of 6,000 yards (5,500 m). At 22:02, at a range of either 800 yards (730 m) or 880 yards (800 m), according to different sources, she fired four Mark 18 electric torpedoes from her bow tubes. The first torpedo hit, blowing the Japanese submarine apart and sinking her almost immediately at 18°53′N 121°50′E. The victim later was identified as Ro-112.

At 02:13 or 02:15, according to different sources, on 13 February 1945, Batfish gained SJ radar contact at a range of 10,700 yards (9,800 m). on a target in the vicinity of Babuyan between Calayan and Daupin Island proceeding on a southeasterly course, on track from Formosa to Batulinao on Luzon. The contact disappeared from radar at 02:41 at a range of 7,150 yards (6,540 m), indicating that it was a submerging submarine. It surfaced at 03:10, and Batfish regained radar and radar detector contact with it at a range of 9,800 yards (9,000 m). Batfish submerged to radar depth at 04:12 with the Japanese submarine 6,800 yards (6,200 m) away, and at a range of 1,500 yards (1,370 m) fired three torpedoes from her stern tubes at 04:48. The first torpedo hit the submarine and blew her apart in large yellow fireball at 19°10′N 121°25′E, sinking her so quickly that the other two torpedoes missed. The submarine later was identified as RO-113.

The three Japanese submarines' use of radar, which, while helping them locate enemy targets, also made them vulnerable to attack because of Batfish′s capability to detect their radar emissions. There were no survivors from any of the three Japanese submarines.

Batfish had performed the unparalleled feat of sinking three enemy submarines in only four days. She headed for Guam on 16 February 1945 in company with Blackfish. As she pulled alongside the submarine tender USS Apollo (AS-25) in Apra Harbor on 21 February 1945, U.S. Navy photographers greeted the successful "sub killer." She continued on to Hawaii in company with Archerfish and reached Pearl Harbor on 3 March 1945. She received a Presidential Unit Citation for the patrol.

==== March–June 1945 ====
On 6 March 1945, Batfish departed Pearl Harbor bound for San Francisco, California, which she reached on 13 March 1945. She entered the shipyard at the Bethlehem Steel Shipbuilding Company there, which began modifying Batfish to participate in Operation Barney, a projected foray into the Japanese minefields guarding the southern entrance to the Sea of Japan by a nine-submarine unit equipped with new mine detectors. However, Batfish′s overhaul uncovered mechanical problems that delayed her preparations. These difficulties, along with her age, rendered Batfish too noisy for such a delicate operation.

Batfish finally departed the shipyard on 31 May 1945 and reached Pearl Harbor on 8 June. She trained for two weeks before departing for Saipan in the Mariana Islands on 26 June 1945.

==== Seventh war patrol ====
After calling at Saipan, Batfish got underway for her seventh war patrol, bound for a lifeguard station off the southeast coast of Kyushu. In the process of lifeguarding and avoiding mistaken attacks by Allied submarines and aircraft, Batfish became the target of two torpedoes, both of which crossed narrowly ahead. On 24 July, while creating a diversion for the submarines USS Sennet (SS-408) and USS Pogy (SS-266), which were scheduled to pass through the Tsushima Strait into the Sea of Japan, Batfish battled on the surface and bombarded the village of Nagata. On 25 July, she sighted a Japanese submarine and attempted to close her for attack. However, the Japanese submarine moved safely through a mined channel and into Kagoshima Bay before Batfish could reach torpedo range.

On 26 July 1945, Batfish rescued three survivors from a ditched United States Army Air Forces B-25 Mitchell bomber. On 1 August 1945, an Okinawa-based B-25 mistook Batfish for a Japanese submarine and dropped four or five bombs, according to different sources, in her vicinity, but none landed close enough to damage her. The rescued aviators disembarked at Iwo Jima on 4 August 1945, and Batfish returned to lifeguard duty off Honshu. On 15 August 1945, word of Japan's surrender arrived, and Batfish received orders to cease offensive operations.

=== Post-World War II ===
==== 1946–1952 ====
The submarine USS Tigrone (SS-419) relieved Batfish on station, and Batfish proceeded via Midway Atoll to Pearl Harbor, where she arrived on 26 August 1945. On 2 September 1945, she departed Pearl Harbor and headed for San Francisco. Arriving there on 9 September 1945, she proceeded to the Mare Island Navy Yard at Mare Island, California, to prepare for decommissioning. Following completion of her pre-inactivation overhaul, she was decommissioned on 6 April 1946 and laid up as a training vessel in the Pacific Reserve Fleet, berthed at Mare Island.

==== 1952–1969 ====
Batfish received her reactivation overhaul in January 1952 and was recommissioned on 7 March 1952 with Lieutenant Commander Robert J. Jackson in command. After six weeks of training, she set course via the Panama Canal for Key West, Florida. She was assigned to Submarine Division 122 in the United States Atlantic Fleet on 21 April 1952. She served the remainder of her commissioned career in training operations in the Caribbean and along the East Coast of the United States.

Batfish was deactivated for the last time on 5 May 1957 at the Charleston Naval Shipyard in Charleston, South Carolina. She was decommissioned on 4 August 1958 and assigned to the Charleston Group of the Atlantic Reserve Fleet. During the summer of 1959, she was assigned as a United States Naval Reserve training vessel at New Orleans, Louisiana, and on 1 July 1960, she was redesignated as an "auxiliary research submarine" (AGSS-310). She continued to serve at New Orleans until she was laid up in the Atlantic Reserve Fleet and her name was struck from the Naval Vessel Registry on 1 November 1969.

=== Honors and awards ===
- Presidential Unit Citation for her sixth war patrol.
- American Campaign Medal
- Asiatic-Pacific Campaign Medal with nine battle stars for her World War II service.
- World War II Victory Medal
- National Defense Service Medal with star

== Museum ship ==
=== Procurement ===
Impressed by the USS Drum museum in Mobile, Alabama, which drew over 300,000 paying visitors its first year, the Oklahoma chapter of the United States Submarine Veterans of World War II sent a delegation from its Oklahoma City and Tulsa chapters in 1969 to ask the U.S. Navy if they could adopt a retired submarine. On hand at the time at Naval Support Activity New Orleans was USS Piranha, which the Navy agreed to turn over to them if they could fulfill the donation requirements. Wanting Piranha for his hometown, then-Oklahoma State Senator James Inhofe agreed to sponsor a bill accepting the submarine for Oklahoma.

An initial report claimed that it was impossible to get a submarine as far up the Arkansas River as Tulsa because the river channel was not deep enough above Muskogee, Oklahoma. Later, a direct tow from New Orleans to Muskogee also was deemed impossible, meaning that another method of transport would have to be devised. The Muskogee City-County Trust Port Authority in the meantime donated 5 acres (2.0 ha) of prime waterfront real estate for the submarine's berth and a memorial park.

The procurement committee of the Oklahoma Submarine Veterans chapter met with the Navy to make preliminary arrangements for the transfer of Piranha, but the Navy refused to hold the submarine unless the committee made a formal application for her with transfer from the Navy being immediate once the donation contract was approved. Since the Arkansas River Navigable Waterway system would not be open for at least a year, the procurement committee would have to incur interim docking charges in the meantime. To avoid this expense, the committee decided to wait and take its chances on another submarine being made available after the waterway opened.

In September 1970, the procurement committee inspected Batfish as a possible alternative to Piranha, both of which by then were in reserve at the Naval Inactive Ship Facility in Orange, Texas. Both submarines had suffered considerable neglect and Piranha had been almost completely cannibalized for parts, but Batfish was much cleaner and better outfitted. Batfish's better war record compared to Piranha′s impressed the committee. In 1971, the committee made a formal application to the Navy to acquire Batfish. The Navy made no objection to the last-minute swap, and the donation contract was drawn up on 24 June 1971. John H. Chafee, the United States Secretary of the Navy, approved the transaction and the United States Congress approved the transfer on 8 November 1971.

=== Towing and placement ===
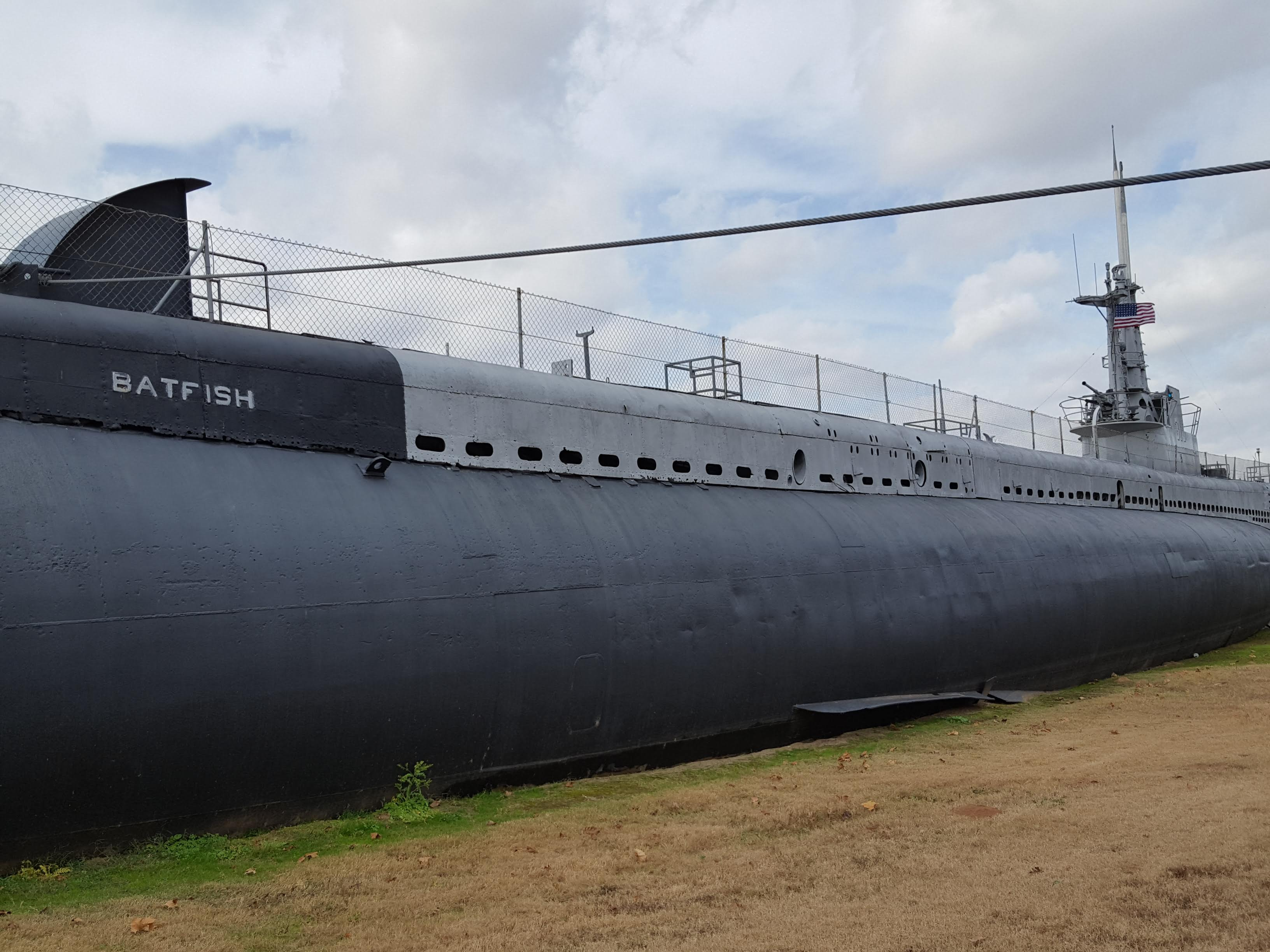
USS Batfish (SS-310) in 2017

On 9 December 1971, the Navy transferred ownership of Batfish to the Oklahoma Maritime Advisory Board. The towing was divided into two phases. the first phase was a direct offshore tow from Orange to Avondale Shipyard in New Orleans. At the shipyard, Batfish was raised on steel lifting straps and cradled between two pairs of bare-decked barges so that the submarine's draft was shallow enough to make the second phase of the tow, 1,350-mile (2,170 km) upriver, possible. Because of Strike action at the Orange drydock, Batfish instead was towed to the Bethlehem Beaumont Shipyard drydock in Beaumont, Texas.

After a general inspection and clearing of fuel and ballast tanks, Batfish was sealed up and was ready to tow to the Avondale Shipyard on 1 March 1972. At Avondale, it was found that the four barges were insufficient to reduce the submarine's draft, and a new plan was devised to use six 120-by-32-foot (36.6 by 9.8 m) barges, ballasted to the outside and linked together by steel cables. On 13 March, Batfish was partially secured to the barges by lifting straps, but no cables had been placed to bind them together when the British tanker Silverman passed through a nearby 5-knot (9.3 km/h; 5.8 mph) zone at 11 knots (20 km/h; 13 mph) that afternoon: the resulting wake sank one barge and seriously damaged several others, although Batfish herself escaped major harm.

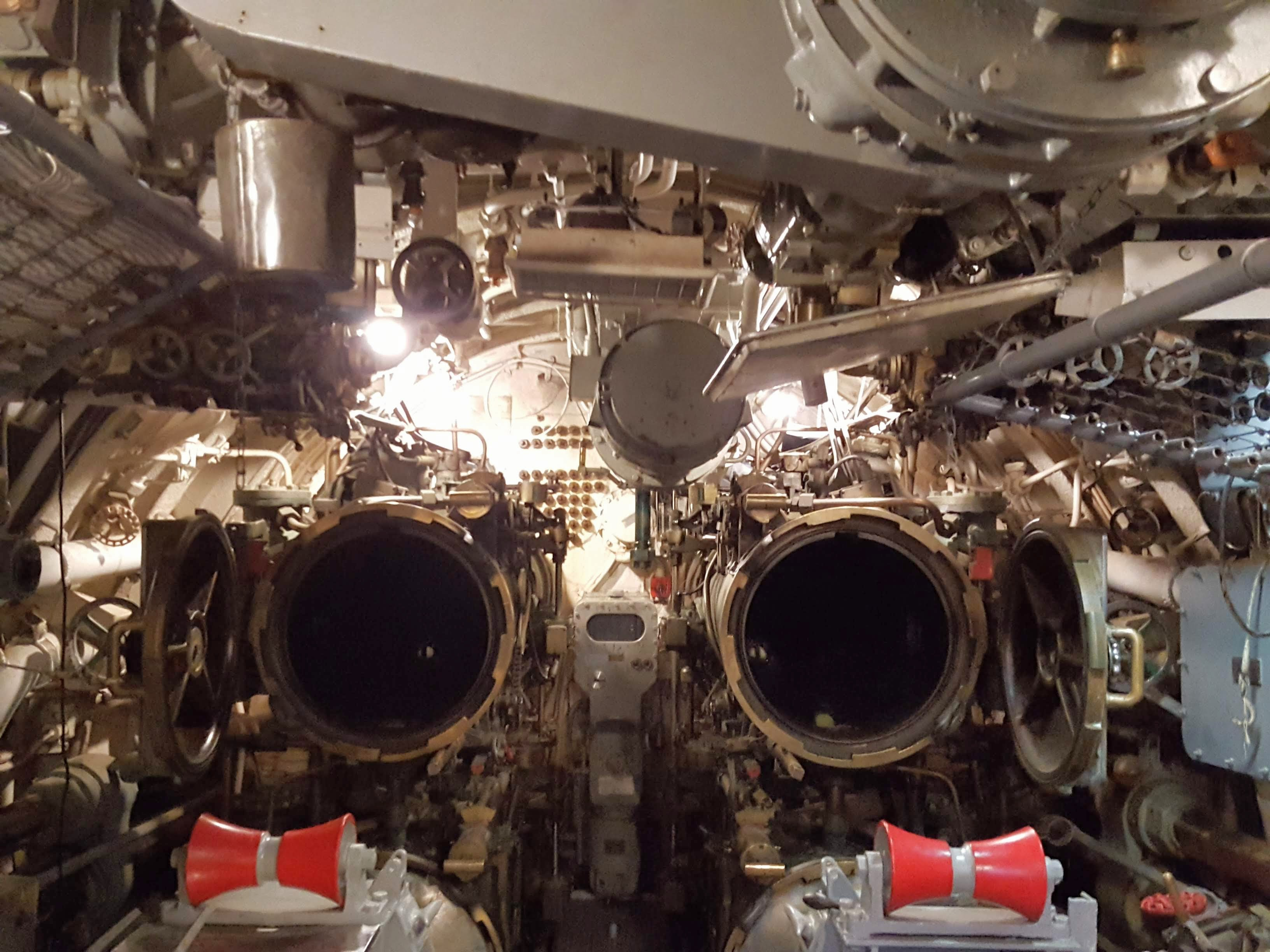
Torpedo room of USS Batfish

The flotilla of barges was re-assembled, and by two tugs slowly moved Batfish upriver at 4 knots (7.4 km/h; 4.6 mph). On 3 May 1972 she passed with ease through Lock-and-Dam Number 6, but her superstructure had trouble clearing a bridge on the way into Little Rock, Arkansas, and was only able to pass under when the United States Army Corps of Engineers lowered the river level by 3 feet (0.91 m). One tug returned downriver, and the second tug continued the tow towards Fort Smith, Arkansas. Batfish arrived at the Will Brothers Port of Muskogee Terminal on 7 May 1972: this was her temporary home until a 120-foot (37 m) wide, 1/4-mile (0.40 km) long trench could be dug to Batfish′s permanent berthing site. On 4 July 1972, while still at Muskogee Terminal, Batfish unofficially was opened to the public. Heavy spring rains flooded the Arkansas River on 12 March 1973, which caused Batfish to strain at her moorings, with fears that she would rip loose and damage the surrounding docks or collide with the new U.S. Route 62 bridge downriver and block the channel. Although Batfish remained moored, the Oklahoma Tourism and Recreation Commission balked at the risk the flood had revealed and asked to return Batfish to the Navy. However, the Navy declined, saying that it expected Oklahoma to honor its contract.

On 4 April 1973, the trench to the new slipway was completed, and Batfish was maneuvered into position by cables attached to four bulldozers and a Port of Muskogee tugboat. Over the next week, further flooding of the slip brought Batfish to her final resting elevation, and by 1 May 1973 she had been realigned to overlook the Arkansas River. at what is now Muskogee War Memorial Park: Home of the USS Batfish. Batfish officially was opened on the Memorial Day weekend in late May 1973. By the end of August 1973, she was attracting a thousand visitors a week, with income from paid attendance doubling over her first seven weeks on display. She had been restored well with the exception of her conning tower. Until May 2019, she was open to the public year-round.

=== Flood damage and planned relocation ===
Batfish sustained US$150,000 in damage during the May 2019 Arkansas River floods, when water from the Arkansas River filled the basin surrounding her, resulting in Batfish floating for the first time in decades. While Batfish's hull remained watertight, allowing her to stay afloat as the water level rose, she began to list, which was corrected by the local fire department filling her ballast tanks with water. While the park and grounds remain open for visitors, Batfish was closed to the public.

In November 2021, citing the poor drainage and plans to expand the Port of Muskogee, discussions started to center on relocating Batfish to Three Forks Harbor in Muskogee along with the museum and its artifacts. A firm plan to relocate the Batfish to Port Muskogee’s Three Forks Harbor, along with the proposed Oklahoma War Memorial and Museum, was announced in March 2025. The $28 million proposal would involve relocating the ship by building two 300-foot boat ramps, trailering the ship to a point a mile up the river, and then loading it on a barge to complete the movement to the new site. $8 million of the cost would be for the Oklahoma War Memorial & Museum, which would be upgraded from the current museum and would include interactive displays and exhibits. However, funding was not yet in place, and would need to come from a variety of sources. In May 2025, the Oklahoma State legislature approved $4 million in funding towards the planned relocation. The Museum moved to a temporary spot inside the Robinson Galley at Three Forks Harbor on July 1, 2025.
