= Clyde, Wisconsin (disambiguation) =

Clyde may refer to the following places in the U.S. state of Wisconsin:

- Clyde, Wisconsin, a town in Iowa County
- Clyde (community), Iowa County, Wisconsin, an unincorporated community
- Clyde, Kewaunee County, Wisconsin, an unincorporated community
