= List of shipwrecks in April 1879 =

The list of shipwrecks in April 1879 includes ships sunk, foundered, grounded, or otherwise lost during April 1879.

== 1 April ==
List of shipwrecks: 1 April 1879
Ship	State	Description
Emma J. Edwards	United States	The schooner capsized four miles (6.4 km) off Tuckernuck Island off Nantucket in dense fog and heavy seas. Two crewmen died, one of her crew was rescued by the United States Life Saving Service.
India	Portugal	The ship was struck by a waterspout and sank in the Atlantic Ocean 200 nautical miles (370 km) off the coast of Delaware with the loss of one life. She was on a voyage from Rio de Janeiro, Brazil to New York.
Isaac Carver	United States	The ship was wrecked on Grand Bahama, Bahamas. She was on a voyage from Cárdenas, Cuba to the Delaware Breakwater.
John W. Hall	United States	The schooner ran aground on Tuckernuck Island west of Nantucket in dense fog and heavy seas. Her crew was rescued by the United States Life Saving Service.
Kingdom of Fife	United Kingdom	The ship was abandoned at sea. She was on a voyage from Samarang, Java Netherlands East Indies to New York, United States.
Margarethe	Denmark	The ship collided with the steamship St. Petersburg (United Kingdom) and sank off Falsterbo, Sweden. All three people on board were rescued by St. Petersburg.
Unnamed	Italy	The brigantine was wrecked at Porto Maurizio. Her crew were rescued.

== 2 April ==
List of shipwrecks: 2 April 1879
Ship	State	Description
Emma	United States	The schooner capsized four miles (6.4 km) off Muskegit Island west of Nantucket in dense fog and heavy seas. Her crew was rescued by the United States Life Saving Service.
Frigga	France	The schooner ran aground at Lerwick, Shetland Islands, United Kingdom.
J. W. Hall	United States	The schooner ran aground on Muskegit Island west of Nantucket in dense fog and heavy seas. Her crew was rescued by the United States Life Saving Service.
Ruby	United Kingdom	The steamship struck the Tuskar Rock and sank. Her crew survived. She was on a voyage from Caen, Calvados, France to Cardiff, Glamorgan.

== 3 April ==
List of shipwrecks: 3 April 1879
Ship	State	Description
Clyde	United Kingdom	Anglo-Zulu War: The transport ship was wrecked on a reef off Dyer's Island, Cape Colony while carrying troops of the 24th Regiment to Natal. The troops were transferred to the troopship HMS Tamar (Royal Navy).
Godthaab	Norway	The barque ran aground at Aberdeen, United Kingdom. She was on a voyage from Brevig to Sunderland, County Durham, United Kingdom. She was refloated with assistance from the tug Derwent (United Kingdom) and towed in to Aberdeen.
Katie	(Canada)	The schooner was abandoned in the Atlantic Ocean. Her crew were rescued by the barque Sommeren (Norway). Katie was on a voyage from Barbados to Boston, Massachusetts, United States.
Leading Star	United Kingdom	The pilot cutter was run down and sunk in the River Avon by the steamship Constance (United Kingdom) with the loss of one life.
St. Hilda	United Kingdom	The barque foundered in the Atlantic Ocean. Her eighteen crew were rescued by the barque Andreas Riis (Norway). St. Hilda was on a voyage from Queenstown, County Cork to Saint John, New Brunswick, Canada.

== 4 April ==
List of shipwrecks: 4 April 1879
Ship	State	Description
Betty	Norway	The barque was abandoned at sea in a sinking condition. Her crew survived.
Cape Sable	United Kingdom	The ship was severely damaged by fire at Cardiff, Glamorgan.
Edendale	United Kingdom	The steamship ran aground at Libava, Courland Governorate. She was on a voyage from Rotterdam, South Holland, Netherlands to Libava. She was refloated.
Hattie King	United States	The ship struck a sunken wreck and was damaged. She was on a voyage from Sagua to New York. She completed her voyage in a leaky condition.
Sarah J. Fort	United States	The schooner ran aground on Peaked Hill Bar off Cape Cod in a snowstorm and was wrecked. She grounded 200 yards (180 m) offshore. Two crewmen died, four rescued by the United States Life Saving Service.
Two Friends	(United Kingdom of Great Britain and Ireland) Guernsey	The brigantine ran aground on the Cromer Rocks, off the coast of Norfolk. She was on a voyage from South Shields, County Durham to Guernsey. She was refloated and taken in to Great Yarmouth, Norfolk in a leaky condition.

== 5 April ==
List of shipwrecks: 5 April 1879
Ship	State	Description
Elivy	United Kingdom	The barque was sighted whilst on a voyage from Rangoon, Burma to the English Channel. No further trace, reported missing.
Glencoe	United Kingdom	The barque ran aground on the Longsand, in the North Sea off the coast of Essex. She was on a voyage from Leith, Lothian to Rockhampton, Queensland. She was refloated and resumed her voyage.
Jason	Germany	The ship departed from Sunderland, County Durham, United Kingdom for Colberg. No further trace, reported missing.
Thornton	United Kingdom	The barque was run down by the steamship Olga (Denmark) and sank in the North Sea 180 or 250 nautical miles (330 or 460 km) off the coast of County Durham with the loss of six of her nine crew. Survivors were rescued by Olga. Thornton was on a voyage from West Hartlepool, County Durham to Danzig, Germany.

== 6 April ==
List of shipwrecks: 6 April 1879
Ship	State	Description
Ansine Marie	Denmark	The schooner was abandoned in the North Sea. She was on a voyage from Newcastle upon Tyne, Northumberland, United Kingdom to "Rodvighaven".
Benledi	United Kingdom	The steamship ran aground on the Whitburn Steel, off the coast of County Durham and was wrecked. Her seventeen crew were rescued by the Coastguard using rocket apparatus. She was on a voyage from Rotterdam, South Holland, Netherlands to the River Tyne.
Elizabeth Hunting	United Kingdom	The ship was driven ashore on Skagen, Denmark. She was refloated with assistance and resumed her voyage.
Gazelle	United States	The brigantine ran aground at Port Natal, Natal Colony.
Imbros	United Kingdom	The ship was driven ashore in the Danube 39 nautical miles (72 km) from its mouth.
La Plata	United Kingdom	The steamship was beached on the coast of Sierra Leone.
Neptun	Germany	The steamship was driven ashore at "Inlangan". She was on a voyage from Lübeck to Reval, Russia.
Nouette	France	The ship was wrecked at Guadeloupe. She was on a voyage from Guadeloupe to Saint-Nazaire, Loire-Inférieure.
Zebu	United Kingdom	The barque ran aground at Port Natal. She was on a voyage from Buenos Aires, Argentina to Port Natal.

== 7 April ==
List of shipwrecks: 7 April 1879
Ship	State	Description
Dinnington	United Kingdom	The steamship was driven ashore at Cap Gris Nez, Pas-de-Calais, France. She was on a voyage from Dieppe, Seine-Inférieure, France to Hartlepool, County Durham.
Dorothy	United Kingdom	The schooner was driven ashore on Heligoland. She was refloated and taken in to Cuxhaven, Germany in a leaky condition. Dorothy was placed under repair.
Erika	Sweden	The schooner was driven ashore on Terschelling, Friesland, Netherlands. She was on a voyage from Gothenburg to Louvain, Flemish Brabant, Belgium.
Falcon	United Kingdom	The schooner ran aground on the Fredra Rocks, of the coast of Fife and was abandoned. Her crew took to a boat; they were rescued by a fishing boat. She was on a voyage from Portmahomack, Ross-shire to Newcastle upon Tyne, Northumberland. She floated off and came ashore at West Wemyss, Fife, where she was wrecked.
Freya	Norway	The barque was wrecked on Sanday, Orkney Islands, United Kingdom. Her crew were rescued. She was on a voyage from Tønsberg to an American port.
Geneviève	France	The barque collided with the full-rigged ship Tabor (United States) and sank off the coast of Brazil. Her crew were rescued by Tabor. Geneviève was on a voyage from Peru to London, United Kingdom.
Koodoo	United Kingdom	The brigantine was driven ashore at Hartley, Northumberland. She was on a voyage from Liverpool to the River Tyne. She was refloated the next day with the assistance of two tugs and taken in to the River Tyne.
St. George	United Kingdom	The brig was severely damaged at North Shields, Northumberland when a rake of six loaded wagons ran away, overshot the staithes and landed on her deck.
Windward	(Dominion of Newfoundland) Newfoundland Colony	The barque ran aground on Lashby Roost, in the Orkney Islands. She was on a voyage from an American port to Aberdeen, United Kingdom. She was refloated.
Unnamed	Flag unknown	The schooner ran aground on the Nore. She was refloated.

== 8 April ==
List of shipwrecks: 8 April 1879
Ship	State	Description
Adeline	Canada	The ship was abandoned in the Atlantic Ocean. Her crew were rescued by Ellida (United Kingdom). Adeline was on a voyage from Cardiff, Glamorgan, United Kingdom to Sagua la Grande, Cuba.
Albula, Persian, and Shamrock	United Kingdom	The steamship Albula collided with the steamship Persian and the coal hulk Shamrock at Gibraltar and was beached. She was on a voyage from Rangoon, Burma to London. Persian was flooded at the bow, Shamrock was severely damaged. Albula was refloated on 18 April.
Batavia	Canada	The ship was wrecked on Inaccessible Island with the loss of three of her crew. There were at least fourteen survivors. They were rescued from a boat on 12 April by the whaler (Flag unknown). Batavia was on a voyage from New York, United States to Shanghai, China.
Delphin	Norway	The brig was wrecked at the mouth of the River Tay with the loss of two of her six crew.
Dorothy	United Kingdom	The barque was driven ashore at Berwick upon Tweed, Northumberland and capsized. She was on a voyage from Huelva, Spain to Berwick upon Tweed. She was refloated.
Frederick en Theodorus	Netherlands	The ship was driven ashore near Roquetas, Spain.
Rouen	United Kingdom	The steamship ran aground at Boulogne, Pas-de-Calais, France. All on board were rescued. She was on a voyage from Bilbao, Spain to Boulogne.
Utrecht	Netherlands	The steamship ran aground in the Strait of Sunda. She was on a voyage from Java, Netherlands East Indies to a Dutch port. She was refloated and resumed her voyage.

== 9 April ==
List of shipwrecks: 9 April 1879
Ship	State	Description
Ariel	United Kingdom	The ship sprang a leak and was beached at Lowestoft, Suffolk. She was on a voyage from King's Lynn, Norfolk to Caen, Calvados, France.
Barrington	United Kingdom	The steamship ran aground on a sunken pile and was holed at Briton Ferry, Glamorgan. She sank at the bow. Barrington was on a voyage from Caen, Calvados to Briton Ferry. She was refloated.
Electra	United Kingdom	The schooner was driven ashore at Chapelton, Renfrewshire. She was on a voyage from Cardiff, Glamorgan to Greenock, Renfrewshire. She was refloated the next day and taken in to Ardrossan, Ayrshire for repairs.
Jules	France	The ship put back to Havre de Grâce, Seine-Inférieure in a sinking condition. She was on a voyage from Havre de Grâce to the Newfoundland Colony.
Juno	Germany	The schooner was driven ashore and wrecked at Fife Ness, United Kingdom with the loss of three of her five crew. She was on a voyage from Papenburg to Grangemouth, Stirlingshire, United Kingdom.
Pennie	United Kingdom	The schooner sank off Porthdinllaen, Caernarfonshire. Her crew were rescued. she was on a voyage from Kilkeel, County Down to Llanelly, Glamorgan.

== 10 April ==
List of shipwrecks: 10 April 1879
Ship	State	Description
Alpha	Norway	The schooner was wrecked near Banff, Aberdeenshire, United Kingdom. She was on a voyage from Sunderland, County Durham to a Baltic port.
Amsterdam	Netherlands	The steamship ran aground at the entrance to the Nieuwe Waterweg. She was on a voyage from Grangemouth, Stirlingshire, United Kingdom to Rotterdam, South Holland. She was refloated and towed in to Rotterdam.
Astrea	Netherlands	The brigantine was abandoned off "Ross Head". Her crew were rescued by the barque Eastern Star (United Kingdom). Astrea was on a voyage from Harlingen, Friesland to Riga, Russia.
Elf	United Kingdom	The tug caught fire in the Bristol Channel off Clevedon, Somerset and was abandoned. Her crew were rescued. She subsequently sank.
George, and Ned	United Kingdom	The Thames barges were run into by the Thames barge Star (United Kingdom) and both sank at Deptford, Kent.
Guiseppinar	United Kingdom	The barque was driven ashore at Great Yarmouth, Norfolk, United Kingdom. All seventeen people on board were rescued by rocket apparatus or the Great Yarmouth Lifeboat. She was on a voyage from Hull, Yorkshire to Cardiff, Glamorgan, United Kingdom.
Sceptre	United Kingdom	The brig foundered in the North Sea 4 nautical miles (7.4 km) east south east of Great Yarmouth, Norfolk. Her six crew took to a boat; they were rescued by the smack Ringleader (United Kingdom). Sceptre was on a voyage from Rotterdam, South Holland to Sunderland, County Durham.

== 11 April ==
List of shipwrecks: 11 April 1879
Ship	State	Description
Alice M. Lewis	United States	The schooner stranded in a gale and heavy seas on the north bar of Townsend's Inlet, New Jersey and was wrecked.
Christiania	Norway	The barque was driven ashore and wrecked at Sea Palling, Norfolk, United Kingdom. Her crew were rescued. She was on a voyage from Sunderland, County Durham to London, United Kingdom.
Fiery Cross	United Kingdom	The tug ran aground and was run into by the vessel she was towing. She was on a voyage from Leith, Lothian to Dundee, Forfarshire.
Natrona	United Kingdom	The barque departed from Ivittuut Greenland for Philadelphia, Pennsylvania, United States. No further trace, reported overdue.
Schwerdorff	France	The schooner sank at Dunkirk, Nord.
Sunshine	United Kingdom	The schooner was driven ashore at Scotstown Head, Aberdeenshire. All eleven people on board were rescued by the Peterhead Lifeboat. She was refloated and taken in to Peterhead, Aberdeenshire in a waterlogged condition.

== 12 April ==
List of shipwrecks: 12 April 1879
Ship	State	Description
Alice Lyne	United Kingdom	The schooner was damaged in a hurricane at Mauritius.
Anna Dorothea	Netherlands	The steamship was driven ashore and wrecked at Tversted, Denmark. Her crew were rescued. She was on a voyage from Newcastle upon Tyne, Northumberland, United Kingdom to Memel, Germany.
Buteshire	United Kingdom	The steamship was severely damaged by an onboard explosion in the Bristol Channel. She was on a voyage from Cardiff, Glamorgan to Savona, Italy. She put back to Cardiff.
China	United Kingdom	The barque was wrecked in a cyclone at Réunion.
Emma C. Beal	United States	The barque was driven ashore at Hook Point, County Waterford, United Kingdom and broke in two. She was on a voyage from Liverpool, Lancashire, United Kingdom to Gloster, Louisiana.
Fredrickstadt	Denmark	The ship was wrecked at Waxham, Norfolk, United Kingdom. Her twelve crew were rescued by the Palling Lifeboat.
Gertrude	United Kingdom	The ship departed from Swansea, Glamorgan for Arcachon, Gironde, France. No further trace, reported missing.
Gloria	Italy	The ship was wrecked in a cyclone at Réunion.
Godaverry	France	The steamship was driven ashore in a cyclone at Mauritius. She was refloated.
Hardwick	United Kingdom	The steamship ran aground on Saltholmen, Denmark. She was on a voyage from West Hartlepool, County Durham to Swinemünde, Germany. She was refloated and taken in to Copenhagen, Denmark.
Huntingdon	United Kingdom	The schooner was driven ashore in Mulroy Bay. She was on a voyage from Londonderry to Mulroy Bay. She was refloated.
Ida	United Kingdom	The ship was abandoned in the Atlantic Ocean. Her crew were rescued by the steamship Californian (United Kingdom). She was on a voyage from Londonderry to Saint John, New Brunswick, Canada.
Jennie B. Gilkey	United States	The schooner was damaged in a cyclone at Réunion.
John Rennie	South Australia	The ship ran aground in the River Torrens. She was refloated.
Palestine	United Kingdom	The barque was driven ashore in a cyclone at Mauritius. She was refloated.
Revival	United Kingdom	The schooner was wrecked in a cyclone at Réunion. She was subsequently taken in to Tamatave, Merina Kingdom.
Seaton	United Kingdom	The steamship ran aground in the Daugava.
Vigilant	United Kingdom	The steam wherry ran aground at Alnmouth, Northumberland. She was on a voyage from Alnmouth to Middlesbrough, Yorkshire. She was refloated on 18 April and resumed her voyage.
Volunteer	Germany	The barque was severely damaged in a cyclone at Réunion.
Watersnake	United Kingdom	The yacht ran aground on the Longnose Rock, off Margate, Kent and was wrecked. All four people on board survived.

== 13 April ==
List of shipwrecks: 13 April 1879
Ship	State	Description
Alpha	United Kingdom	The collier struck the Barnard Sand, in the North Sea off the coast of Suffolk and sank with the loss of all hands.
Brothers	United Kingdom	The schooner sprang a leak and sank in Dundalk Bay. Her crew survived.
Carrara	Italy	The barque ran aground on the Maloria Bank. She was on a voyage from Livorno to New York, United States.
Effort	United Kingdom	The schooner struck the wreck of the steamship Mary (United Kingdom) and sank at North Shields, Northumberland. She was on a voyage from Kirkwall, Orkney Islands to North Shields.
Merchant	United Kingdom	The brig ran aground on the Kentish Knock. She was on a voyage from Newhaven, Sussex to South Shields, County Durham. She floated off but consequently foundered. All on board were rescued by the brig Mary (United Kingdom).
Puzzle	United Kingdom	The schooner was driven ashore at Penarth, Glamorgan and broke her back.
St. Andries	United Kingdom	The steamship collided with the steamship Cyprus (United Kingdom) and sank in the River Usk. She was refloated and taken in to Newport, Monmouthshire.
Tenedos	United Kingdom	The steamship ran aground in the Dardanelles. She was on a voyage from London to Constantinople, Ottoman Empire and Odesa, Russian Empire. She was refloated and towed in to Constantinople.
Zeemeeuw	Netherlands	The schooner was driven ashore at Gioia Tauro, Italy.

== 14 April ==
List of shipwrecks: 14 April 1879
Ship	State	Description
Billow	United Kingdom	The schooner was driven ashore at Balbriggan, County Dublin. Her crew were rescued. She was on a voyage from Glasgow, Renfrewshire to Balbriggan.
Janet and Mary	United Kingdom	The ship was beached at Hartlepool, County Durham. She was on a voyage from Stockton-on-Tees, County Durham to Newcastle upon Tyne, Northumberland.
Robert and Agnes	United Kingdom	The fishing boat went ashore on the western side of the Hayle Estuary, Cornwall while attempting to enter the harbour.
Vulcan	United Kingdom	The steamship ran aground at San Stefano Point, Ottoman Empire.

== 15 April ==
List of shipwrecks: 15 April 1879
Ship	State	Description
Aquila	Italy	The ship foundered off "Cape Fanica". Her crew were rescued. She was on a voyage from Malta to Cagliari, Sardinia.
Blythwood	United Kingdom	The steamship ran aground at Kertch, Russia. She was refloated with assistance the next day.
Jeune Amie Marie	France	The ship ran aground in the Isles of Scilly, United Kingdom. She was on a voyage from Redon, Ille-et-Vilaine to Cardiff, Glamorgan, United Kingdom.
Neilson Taylor	United Kingdom	The steamship ran aground at Dundee, Forfarshire. She was on a voyage from Dundee to Amble, Northumberland. She was refloated and resumed her voyage.
North Star	United Kingdom	The tug was driven ashore on the western side of the Hayle estuary when her screw was fouled by a rope while attempting to refloat the stranded fishing boat Robert and Agnes.

== 16 April ==
List of shipwrecks: 16 April 1879
Ship	State	Description
Castalia	(United Kingdom of Great Britain and Ireland) Jersey	The schooner ran aground on the Goodwin Sands, Kent. She was on a voyage from a Scottish port to Jersey. She was refloated and resumed her voyage.
Lola	Sweden	The barque was wrecked at Port Natal, Natal Colony.
Shildon	United Kingdom	The steamship ran aground at Jeddah, Hejaz Vilayet. She was on a voyage from Busreh, Persia to Constantinople, Ottoman Empire. She was refloated and taken in to Suez, Egypt.
Try	United Kingdom	The cutter struck a sunken wreck and foundered in the North Sea off the coast of Norfolk. Her crew survived.

== 17 April ==
List of shipwrecks: 17 April 1879
Ship	State	Description
Cassa Marittima	Italy	The barque caught fire at Cardiff, Glamorgan, United Kingdom and was scuttled. She was refloated on 26 April and placed under repair.
Commerce	United Kingdom	The schooner ran aground on the Dogger Bank, in the Irish Sea. She was on a voyage from Ayr to Wexford. She was refloated and completed her voyage.
J. C. W. Thun	Germany	The ship departed from East London, Cape Colony for Mauritius. No further trace, reported missing.

== 18 April ==
List of shipwrecks: 18 April 1879
Ship	State	Description
Great Republic	United States	The paddle steamer was wrecked on Sand Island at the mouth of the Columbia River in Oregon, breaking up the next day with the loss of 11 or 14 crewmen.
Josephine	France	The lugger was wrecked 6 nautical miles (11 km) from La Barre-de-Monts, Vendée. Her crew were rescued.
Molitamo	United Kingdom	The ship ran aground at Harwich, Essex. She was on a voyage from Philadelphia, Pennsylvania, United States to Harwich. She was refloated with assistance.
Prosperous	United Kingdom	The smack was run into by the steamship Erasmus Wilson (United Kingdom) and sank in the Humber.

== 19 April ==
List of shipwrecks: 19 April 1879
Ship	State	Description
Dashing Wave	United Kingdom	The ship ran aground at Fowey, Cornwall. She was on a voyage from Aracaju, Brazil to Fowey. She was refloated and taken in to Fowey in a leaky condition.
Diana	Sweden	The brigantine was driven ashore at Helsingborg. She was on a voyage from Porto, Portugal to Copenhagen, Denmark. She was refloated.
Eliza	United Kingdom	The fishing lugger foundered off the Tuskar Rock with the loss of all seven crew.
Lizzie	United Kingdom	The fishing smack off the coast of County Waterford with the loss of all six crew.
Loch Earn	United Kingdom	The steamship was driven ashore and wrecked at Hasle, Bornholm, Denmark. She was on a voyage from Burntisland, Fife to Riga, Russia.
Saint Yves	France	The barque ran aground on the Goodwin Sands, Kent, United Kingdom. She was refloated with assistance from the tug Express (United Kingdom) and taken in to The Downs.
Sir Charles Napier	United Kingdom	The ship was wrecked on Ascension Island. Her twenty crew survived. She was on a voyage from Hong Kong to London.
Thought	United Kingdom	The schooner collided with the steamship Brennus (United Kingdom) and sank in Liverpool Bay. Her seven crew were rescued by Brennus. Thought was on a voyage from Aracaju, Brazil to Liverpool, Lancashire.

== 20 April ==
List of shipwrecks: 20 April 1879
Ship	State	Description
Abrasia	United Kingdom	The brigantine sprang a leak and sank in the Atlantic Ocean 200 nautical miles (370 km) off Tory Island, County Donegal. Her crew were rescued by the barque Annie (United Kingdom). Abrasia was on a voyage from Glasgow, Renfrewshire to Sydney, Nova Scotia, Canada.
Margarethe	Netherlands	The koff was driven ashore and wrecked at Domsten, Sweden. She was on a voyage from Harlingen, Friesland to Ventava, Courland Governorate.

== 21 April ==
List of shipwrecks: 21 April 1879
Ship	State	Description
Carolina Z	United Kingdom	The ship caught fire at Bermuda and was scuttled. She was on a voyage from Philadelphia, Pennsylvania, United States to Queenstown, County Cork.
Kepler	United Kingdom	The steamship was driven ashore in the Krishna River. She was later refloated and found to be leaky.
Titus	Germany	The steamship was driven ashore at Hela. She was on a voyage from Middlesbrough, Yorkshire to Danzig. She was refloated.

== 22 April ==
List of shipwrecks: 22 April 1879
Ship	State	Description
Gottfried	Flag unknown	The brig ran aground at Ramsgate, Kent, United Kingdom. She was refloated and taken in to Ramsgate in a waterlogged condition.
Maria	United Kingdom	The fishing cutter ran on to the Gear Rock, in Mount's Bay and sank.
Nile	United Kingdom	The steamship struck the Linuela Rocks and foundered off Cape Finisterre, Spain with the loss of twenty of her 23 crew. Survivors were rescued by the steamship Recovery (United Kingdom).

== 23 April ==
List of shipwrecks: 23 April 1879
Ship	State	Description
Bessemer	United Kingdom	The steamship ran aground at Lowestoft, Suffolk. She was on a voyage from Middlesbrough, Yorkshire to Lowestoft.
Elizabeth	United Kingdom	The barque was driven ashore at Demerara, British Guiana. She was on a voyage from Troon, Ayrshire to Demerara. She was refloated and taken in to Demerara.
Flying Foam	United Kingdom	The smack was run down and sunk in Liverpool Bay by the steamship Ardentinny (United Kingdom) with the loss of two of her three crew. The survivor was rescued by Ardentinny.
Niva	United Kingdom	The steamship was severely damaged by fire at Gravesend, Kent.
Ruby	New Zealand	The schooner struck Walker Rock in the Marlborough Sounds and became a complete wreck. All on board were rescued by the steamship Taiaroa (New Zealand).
Sinai	United Kingdom	The ship collided with another vessel and sank in the Swin with the loss of all hands.

== 24 April ==
List of shipwrecks: 24 April 1879
Ship	State	Description
Eliza Christie	Canada	The schooner was driven ashore and wrecked at Areceibo, Puerto Rico. Her crew were rescued.
Nora	France	The steam yacht struck the wreck of the steamship Longhirst (United Kingdom) and sank off Hartley, Northumberland, United Kingdom. All 44 people on board survived.

== 25 April ==
List of shipwrecks: 25 April 1879
Ship	State	Description
Alliance, Daisy, and George Bratton	United Kingdom	The steamship Alliance collided with the pilot boat George Bratton and then collided with the steamship Daisy at Cardiff, Glamorgan and was damaged. She was on a voyage from Cardiff to Saint-Nazaire, Loire-Inférieure, France. She put back to Cardiff. George Bratton was damaged. Daisy was consequently beached. She was on a voyage from Cardiff to "Hummelsvigen".
Amazonas, and Somorrostro	United Kingdom	The steamship Amazonas collided with the steamship Somorrostro and sank in the Bristol Channel off Lavernock, Glamorgan. Her crew were rescued. Amazonas was on a voyage from Rotterdam, South Holland, Netherlands to Cardiff. She was refloated on 21 May and taken in to Cardiff. Somorrostro was on a voyage from Cardiff to Saint-Nazaire. She was consequently beached. SHe was refloated on 27 April and taken in to Cardiff.
Belen	United Kingdom	The steam launch sprang a leak and sank off the Mab Lightship ( Trinity House). Both crew were rescued by the fishing lugger Favourite (United Kingdom).
Ferdinand Holdinghausen	Germany	The ship collided with the barque Rolf (Norway) and sank in the English Channel 11 nautical miles (20 km) off Dover, Kent, United Kingdom with the loss of her captain. Survivors were rescued by Rolf. Ferdinand Holdinghausen was on a voyage from Haiti to Rotterdam, South Holland, Netherlands.
Zuba	United Kingdom	The barque was destroyed by fire between the Faroe Islands and the Shetland Islands.

== 26 April ==
List of shipwrecks: 26 April 1879
Ship	State	Description
Aurora	United Kingdom	The ship was driven ashore on Mew Island, County Down. She was on a voyage from Belfast, County Antrim to Maryport, Cumberland. She was refloated.
Australia	Italy	The steamship struck a rock off Vada and foundered. All on board were rescued. She was on a voyage from Livorno to Naples and Bombay, India.
Velocity	Norway	The barque collided with the steamship City of Rio de Janeiro (United States) and sank in the Atlantic Ocean (38°45′N 73°30′W) with the loss of one of her twelve crew. Survivors were rescued by City of Rio de Janeiro. Velocity was on a voyage from Hull, Yorkshire, United Kingdom to Philadelphia, Pennsylvania, United States.

== 27 April ==
List of shipwrecks: 27 April 1879
Ship	State	Description
Daisy	United Kingdom	The steamship collided with the steamship Alliance (United Kingdom) and was beached at Penarth, Glamorgan.
Diamanten	Norway	The ship was driven ashore north of Spurn Point, Yorkshire, United Kingdom. She was on a voyage from Arendal to King's Lynn, Norfolk, United Kingdom.
Eliza B.	United Kingdom	The brig collided with the steamship James Hogg (United Kingdom) and sank off Pakefield, Suffolk. Her crew were rescued by James Hogg. Eliza B. was on a voyage from Folkestone, Kent to South Shields, County Durham.
Ranger	United Kingdom	The dandy struck a sunken wreck and sank in the North Sea off Cromer, Norfolk. Her crew were rescued. She was on a voyage from Great Yarmouth, Norfolk to Hartlepool, County Durham.
Robert Dickinson	United Kingdom	The steamship was driven ashore and wrecked at Flamborough Head, Yorkshire. She was on a voyage from Newcastle upon Tyne, Northumberland to Naples, Italy. She broke up on 7 May.

== 28 April ==
List of shipwrecks: 28 April 1879
Ship	State	Description
Celia	United Kingdom	The ship was wrecked at Pernambuco, Brazil. Her crew were rescued. She was on a voyage from London to Penedo, Brazil.
Esk	United Kingdom	The steamship was driven ashore at Riga, Russia. She was later refloated and towed in to Bolderāja, Russia.
Kielder Castle	United Kingdom	The ship ran aground near "Beilisari", Russia. She was refloated the next day.
Lion Belge	(United Kingdom of Great Britain and Ireland) Gibraltar	The tug was driven ashore at Tangier, Morocco.
Wave	United Kingdom	The brigantine ran aground on the Cross Sands, in the North Sea off the coast of Norfolk. She was on a voyage from Goole, Yorkshire to Plymouth, Devon. She was refloated with the assistance of a tug and takne in to Great Yarmouth, Norfolk in a leaky condition.

== 29 April ==
List of shipwrecks: 29 April 1879
Ship	State	Description
Francisco	Italy	The barque ran aground in the Bute Channel. She was on a voyage from Cardiff, Glamorgan, United Kingdom to Porto Grande Bay.
Nile	United Kingdom	The steamship sank off Cape Finisterre, Spain while en route to Newport, Monmouthshire. The three surviving crew out of twenty-three were landed at St Mary's, Isles of Scilly by the steamship Recovery (United Kingdom).
Strathnaver	United Kingdom	The passenger ship was destroyed by fire off "Polly Beach" with the presumed loss of all on board. She was on a voyage from Sydney, New South Wales to London. A message in a bottle stating that she was on fire on the date in question washed up on the coast of New Zealand.

== 30 April ==
List of shipwrecks: 30 April 1879
Ship	State	Description
Barbara	United Kingdom	The fishing yawl foundered in the Clams, off the Scottish coast with the loss of all four crew.
Keith	United Kingdom	The steamship struck the Carr Rock. She was beached on the Abertay Sands, off the coast of Forfarshire and sank. She was on a voyage from Inverkeithing, Fife to Dundee, Forfarshire. Keith was refloated on 7 May.
Turner	United Kingdom	The ship departed from Irvine, Ayrshire for Whitehead, County Antrim. No further trace, reported missing.
Three unnamed vessels	Austria-Hungary	The accommodation barges sank in the Tisza at Szegedin during a flood. One person was reported missing.

== Unknown date ==
List of shipwrecks: Unknown date in April 1879
Ship	State	Description
Ada	Germany	The barque was abandoned in the Atlantic Ocean. Her crew were rescued by the steamship Delos (United Kingdom). Ada was on a voyage from Almería, Spain. to Philadelphia, Pennsylvania, United States.
Adrienne	France	The ship was lost at Muscat, Muscat and Oman.
Alga	United Kingdom	The steamship sank at Sulina, United Principalities before 9 April. She was on a voyage from Liverpool, Lancashire to Sulina.
Anastasia	Germany	The steamship ran aground on the Horns Reef, in the Baltic Sea. She was on a voyage from a Baltic port to Bremen. She was refloated and completed her voyage in a severely leaky condition.
Anemone	United Kingdom	The yacht struck rocks off Ouessant, Finistère, France. She put in to Brest in a leaky condition.
Antje Haverbult	Netherlands	The schooner ran aground at Gioia Tauro, Italy. Her crew were rescued.
Beautiful Star	United States	The barque ran aground at Honfleur, Manche, France. She was on a voyage from New Orleans, Louisiana to Rouen, Seine-Inférieure, France. She was refloated with the assistance of a tug.
Bennington	United States	The ship was abandoned in the Atlantic Ocean with the loss of three of her eight crew. Survivors were rescued by the barque Portia (United Kingdom). Bennington was on a voyage from Boston, Massachusetts to Havana, Cuba.
Bernina	United Kingdom	The steamship departed from New York, United States for Bristol, Gloucestershire. Reported missing, presumed foundered. A wrecked steamship seen in the Atlantic Ocean on 30 April may have been Bernina.
Bravo	Germany	The brig was driven ashore at Stevns, Denmark. She was on a voyage from Swinemünde to Emden. She was refloated and taken in to Copenhagen, Denmark.
Caroline Catherine	United Kingdom	The brig was driven ashore and wrecked at Hasle, Bornholm, Denmark with the loss of two of her nine crew. She was on a voyage from Liverpool to Libava Courland Governorate.
Celine	France	The brigantine was wrecked at Greytown, Nicaragua. Her crew were rescued.
Ceres	Denmark	The brigantine was driven ashore at Almería
Champion	United States	The ship ran aground in the Schuylkill River. She was refloated and taken in to the Delaware Breakwater.
Cicerone	United Kingdom	The schooner ran aground on the Scroby Sands, Norfolk. She was on a voyage from Hartlepool, County Durham to Folkestone, Kent.
Cohanim	United Kingdom	The steamship ran aground in the Scheldt. She was on a voyage from Antwerp, Belgium to Lisbon, Portugal. She was refloated with the assistance of six tugs and resumed her voyage.
Connemara	United Kingdom	The ship was damaged by fire at New Orleans, Louisiana.
Delphin	Norway	The brig was driven ashore and wrecked at the mouth of the River Tay. Two of her six crew were reported missing. She was on a voyage from Fredrikstad to Grangemouth, Stirlingshire, United Kingdom.
Dennington	United Kingdom	The ship ran aground at Cap Gris Nez, Pas-de-Calais, France. She was on a voyage from Dieppe, Seine-Inférieure to West Hartlepool, County Durham. She was refloated and resumed her voyage.
Elia	United Kingdom	The ship was wrecked at Maceió, Brazil. Her crew were rescued.
Erede	Flag unknown	The ship ran aground at Heligoland.
Gamma	Russia	The schooner collided with the steamship Knud (Denmark) on or before 7 April and sank with the loss of a crew member. Survivors were rescued by Knud. Gamma was on a voyage from a Spanish port to Libava, Courland Governorate.
Gladiolus	United Kingdom	The barque became waterlogged and all her thirteen crew bar one were washed overboard. The survivov was taken off on 4 April by Humboldt (Germany). Gladiolus was on a voyage from Doboy to North Shields, Northumberland.
Guttreil	Germany	The schooner was driven ashore at Svaneke, Denmark. She was on a voyage from Memel to Dover, Kent. She was a total loss.
Henock	Austria-Hungary	The ship was driven ashore at "Daganastan", Ottoman Empire. She was on a voyage from Newcastle upon Tyne, Northumberland to Odesa, Russia.
Hilda	France	The brigantine was driven ashore on Martinique. She was refloated with assistance and towed in to Martinique.
Hunnus	Austria-Hungary	The barque foundered in the Atlantic Ocean. Her crew were rescued. She was on a voyage from Baltimore, Maryland, United States to Bordeaux, Gironde, France.
Ida E. Baker	United States	The fishing schooner was lost on the Grand Banks of Newfoundland with the loss of all twelve crew.
Johanne	Germany	The barque was abandoned in the Atlantic Ocean. Her crew were rescued by the steamship Delos (United Kingdom). Johanne was on a voyage from British Honduras to London, United Kingdom.
John Middleton	United States	The ship was abandoned in the Atlantic Ocean before 4 April.
Karen Maria	Denmark	The schooner struck rocks off the coast of Calabria, Italy. She put in to Messina, Sicily, where she sank. Her crew were rescued.
Lancaster	United Kingdom	The ship was destroyed by fire at Galveston, Texas, United States. She was on a voyage from Galveston to Liverpool.
Lephenstrath	United Kingdom	The ship was driven ashore at Cárdenas, Cuba. She was on a voyage from Havana to Cárdenas. She was reported to have been refloated and taken in to Cárdenas, but was subsequently reported to have become a wreck.
Louisa Geerdina	Netherlands	The derelict galiot sank off IJmuiden, North Holland. She was on a voyage from the Nieuwe Diep to Drøbak, Norway.
Mary E. Rigg	United States	The ship was driven ashore at New Orleans. She was on a voyage from New Orleans to Bremen, Germany.
Migrate	United Kingdom	The lighter was driven ashore and wrecked at Hartlepool, County Durham.
Moselle	United Kingdom	The ship was driven ashore near Demerara, British Guiana. She was refloated with assistance.
Nordstjernen	Denmark	The schooner ran aground and capsized 3 nautical miles (5.6 km) from Sutton Bridge, Lincolnshire, United Kingdom. She was on a voyage from Wisbech, Cambridgeshire, United Kingdom to Copenhagen.
Norina	United Kingdom	The schooner foundered off Torre del Mar, Spain. Seven crew were rescued by the schooner Africano (Portugal).
Norma	Norway	The steamship sank in ice off Domesnes, Courland Governorate. Her crew were rescued. She was on a voyage from Bergen to Riga, Russia.
Notre Dame	France	The schooner was wrecked at Vestmannaeyjar, Iceland. Her crew survived.
Nyverheid	Netherlands	The ship sank in the North Sea. Her crew survived. She was on a voyage from Vlissingen, Zeeland to Memel.
Orbessan	France	The ship struck floating wreckage in the Bay of Biscay and was damaged. She was on a voyage from Senegal to Bordeaux. She completed her voyage in a severely leaky condition.
Oriental	United Kingdom	The barque was wrecked on Cape Sable Island, Nova Scotia, Canada. Her crew were rescued.
Ottilie	Flag unknown	The brigantine was discovered in the North Sea 30 nautical miles (56 km) north east of Kinnaird Head, Aberdeenshire, United Kingdom. She was taken in tow by a smack but capsized and sank.
Panola	United States	The ship collided with Thomas Brooks (United States) and sank off the coast of Cuba. Her crew survived. Panola was on a voyage from New York to Havana.
Pauillac	France	The ship was driven ashore on Martinique. She was refloated with assistance and towed in to Martinique.
Porthcawl	United Kingdom	The tug sank at New Brighton, Cheshire.
Selina C.	United Kingdom	The ship was abandoned in the Atlantic Ocean. Her crew were rescued. She was on a voyage from the Bear River to Barbados.
Senator Iken	United States	The ship ran aground in the Schuylkill River. She was on a voyage from Philadelphia to Genoa, Italy. She was refloated and resumed her voyage.
St. Augustin	(France) Réunion	The brig was driven ashore at Mahela, 100 nautical miles (190 km) south of Mahanoro, Merina Kingdom. Her crew were rescued
St. Helens	United Kingdom	The schooner was driven ashore and wrecked at Rønne, Denmark. She was on a voyage from Banff, Aberdeenshire to Danzig, Germany.
Sutherland	United Kingdom	The schooner was driven ashore and wrecked at Hammeren, Bornhokm. She was on a voyage from Methil, Fife to Königsberg, Germany. She was a total loss.
Teresa	Spain	The ship was driven ashore at Almería.
Vassallo	Italy	The ship foundered off Rio de Janeiro, Brazil. She was on a voyage from Buenos Aires, Argentina to a British port.
William Thompson	United States	The fishing schooner sank in a gale on the Grand Banks of Newfoundland. Lost with all 14 crewmen.
William Woodbury	United States	The ship was driven ashore in Chesapeake Bay. She was on a voyage from Baltimore to Bremen, Germany. She was refloated with the assistance of a steamship and resumed her voyage.
Willy	Germany	The schooner was abandoned in the English Channel. Her crew were rescued by Alida (United Kingdom). Willy was on a voyage from Stettin to Portmadoc, Caernarfonshire, United Kingdom.
