= Clyde (surname) =

Clyde is a surname of Scottish origin.

The surname originated as a name for people who lived on the banks of the River Clyde, which flows through Glasgow, Scotland.

== People ==
- Andrew Clyde (born 1963), American politician
- Andy Clyde (1892–1967), Scottish actor
- Bradley Clyde (born 1970), Australian rugby player
- David Clyde (born 1955), American baseball pitcher
- David Francis Clyde (1925–2002), British tropical physician and malariologist
- George Dewey Clyde, (1898–1972), American politician
- Ian Clyde (born 1956), Canadian boxer
- Irene Clyde (1869–1954), English lawyer, writer and activist
- James Clyde, multiple people
- Jeremy Clyde (born 1941), English actor
- June Clyde (1909–1987), American actress, singer, and dancer
- Norman Clyde (1885–1972), American mountaineer and photographer
- Thomas Clyde (disambiguation), multiple people

== See also ==
- Clyde (disambiguation)
