= Japanese submarine Ro-55 (1944) =

Kaichū-type submarine

History

Japan
- Name: Submarine No 396
- Builder: Mitsui Zosensho, Tamano, Japan
- Laid down: 5 August 1943
- Launched: 23 April 1944
- Renamed: Ro-55 on 23 April 1944
- Completed: 30 September 1944
- Commissioned: 30 September 1944
- Fate: Sunk 7 February 1945
- Stricken: 10 May 1945

General characteristics
- Class & type: Kaichū type submarine (K6 subclass)
- Displacement: 1,133 tonnes (1,115 long tons) surfaced; 1,470 tonnes (1,447 long tons) submerged
- Length: 80.5 m (264 ft 1 in) overall
- Beam: 7 m (23 ft 0 in)
- Draft: 4.07 m (13 ft 4 in)
- Installed power: 4,200 bhp (3,100 kW) (diesel); 1,200 hp (890 kW) (electric motor)
- Propulsion: Diesel-electric; 1 × diesel engine; 1 × electric motor
- Speed: 19.75 knots (36.58 km/h; 22.73 mph) surfaced; 8 knots (15 km/h; 9.2 mph) submerged
- Range: 5,000 nmi (9,300 km; 5,800 mi) at 16 knots (30 km/h; 18 mph) surfaced; 45 nmi (83 km; 52 mi) at 5 knots (9.3 km/h; 5.8 mph) submerged
- Test depth: 80 m (260 ft)
- Crew: 61
- Armament: 4 × bow 533 mm (21 in) torpedo tubes; 1 × 76.2 mm (3.00 in) L/40 anti-aircraft gun; 2 × single 25 mm (1.0 in) AA guns

The second Ro-55 was an Imperial Japanese Navy Kaichū type submarine of the K6 sub-class. Completed and commissioned in September 1944, she served in World War II and was sunk during her first war patrol in February 1945.

== Design and description ==
The submarines of the K6 sub-class were versions of the preceding K5 sub-class with greater range and diving depth. They displaced 1,133 tonnes (1,115 long tons) surfaced and 1,470 tonnes (1,447 long tons) submerged. The submarines were 80.5 meters (264 ft 1 in) long, had a beam of 7 meters (23 ft 0 in) and a draft of 4.07 meters (13 ft 4 in). They had a diving depth of 80 meters (260 ft).

For surface running, the boats were powered by two 2,100-brake-horsepower (1,566 kW) diesel engines, each driving one propeller shaft. When submerged each propeller was driven by a 600-horsepower (447 kW) electric motor. They could reach 19.75 knots (36.58 km/h; 22.73 mph) on the surface and 8 knots (15 km/h; 9.2 mph) underwater. On the surface, the K6s had a range of 11,000 nautical miles (20,000 km; 13,000 mi) at 12 knots (22 km/h; 14 mph); submerged, they had a range of 45 nmi (83 km; 52 mi) at 5 knots (9.3 km/h; 5.8 mph).

The boats were armed with four internal bow 53.3 cm (21.0 in) torpedo tubes and carried a total of ten torpedoes. They were also armed with a single 76.2 mm (3.00 in) L/40 anti-aircraft gun and two single 25 mm (1.0 in) AA guns.

== Construction and commissioning ==
Ro-55 was laid down as Submarine No. 396 on 5 August 1943 by Mitsui Zosensho at Tamano, Japan. She was launched on 23 April 1944 and was renamed Ro-55 that day, the second Japanese submarine of that name. She was completed and commissioned on 30 September 1944.

== Service history ==
Upon commissioning, Ro-55 was attached to the Maizuru Naval District and assigned to Submarine Squadron 11 for workups. She was reassigned to Submarine Division 34 in the 6th Fleet on 4 January 1945.

=== First war patrol ===
On 27 January 1945, Ro-55 departed Kure, Japan, to begin her first war patrol, assigned a patrol area in the South China Sea west of Mindoro in the Philippine Islands. While in the Philippine Sea east of Luzon on 2 February 1945, she reported that Allied aircraft had attacked her and that she would reach her patrol area five days late. The Japanese never heard from her again.

=== Loss ===
After dark on 7 February 1945, the United States Navy destroyer escort USS Thomason (DE-203) detected a surfaced submarine on radar while escorting a Leyte Gulf-bound Allied convoy off Iba, Luzon. As she closed the range, the submarine submerged, and at 23:30 Thomason began attacks against it, firing 24-projectile Hedgehog barrages that sank the submarine at 15°27′N 119°25′E.

The RO-55 was detected on the surface by the United States Navy Submarine USS Batfish (SS-310) , radar and was attacked and confirmed sunk by Lt, Cmdr. John Fife, USN on 10 Feb 1945 at 18°50′N 121°40′E, by a torpedo attack with no survivors.

The submarine Thomason sank probably was Ro-55. On 1 March 1945, the Imperial Japanese Navy declared her to be presumed lost off the Philippine Islands with all 80 men on board. The Japanese struck her from the Navy list on 10 May 1945.
