= Clyde A. Thomason =

US Marine and Medal of Honor recipient

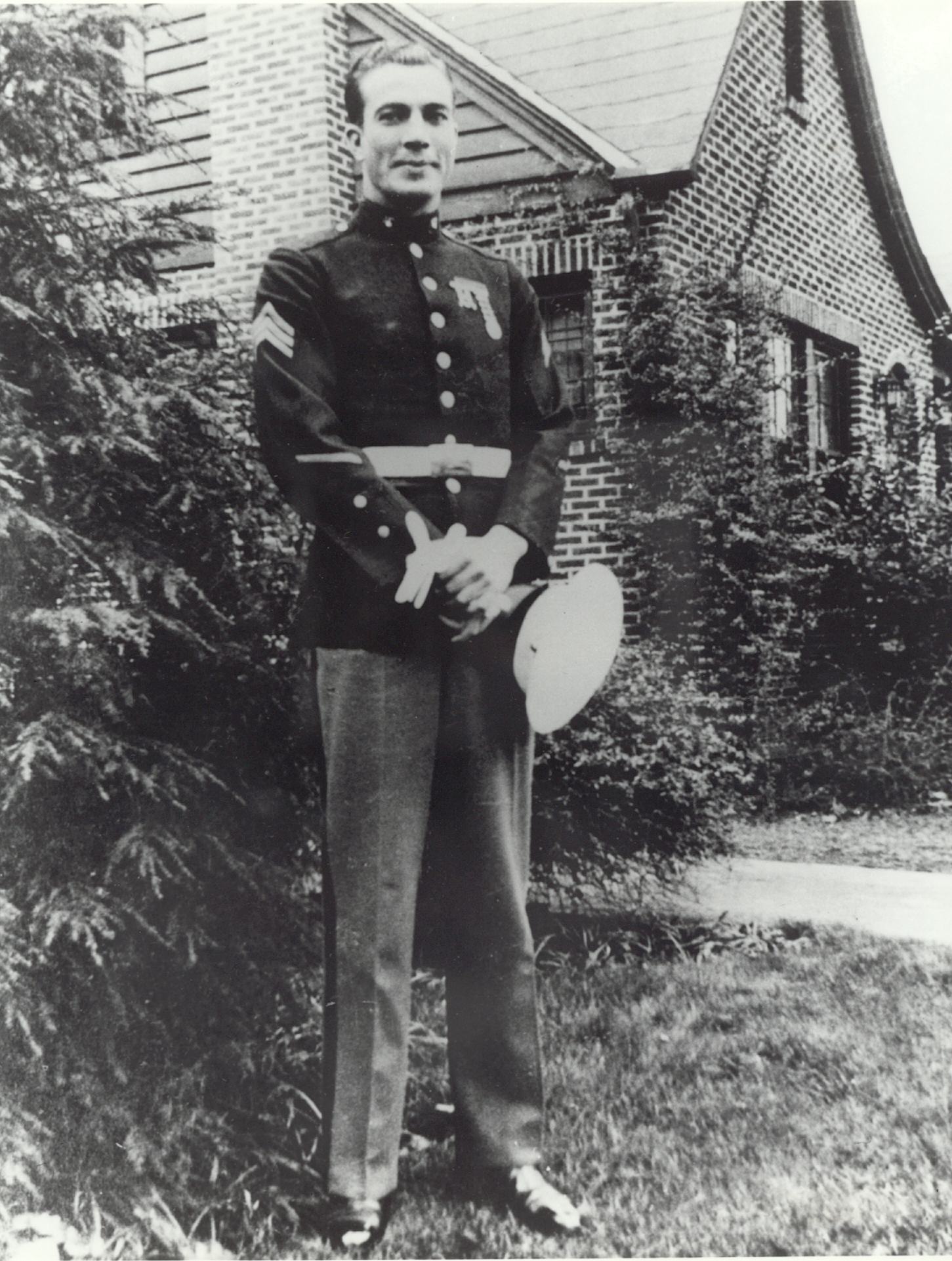
- Sgt Clyde A. Thomason, posthumous Medal of Honor recipient
- Born: May 23, 1914; Atlanta, Georgia, U.S.
- Died: August 17, 1942 (aged 28); Makin Island (present-day Butaritari, Kiribati)
- Burial place: Arlington National Cemetery
- Military career
- Allegiance: United States
- Branch: United States Marine Corps
- Service years: 1934–1939, 1942
- Rank: Sergeant
- Unit: 2nd Raider Battalion
- Conflicts: World War II: Makin Island raid †
- Awards: Medal of Honor; Purple Heart; Marine Corps Good Conduct Medal; China Service Medal; American Defense Medal; Asiatic-Pacific Campaign Medal w/1 star World War II Victory Medal

Sergeant Clyde A. Thomason (May 23, 1914 – August 17, 1942) was a United States Marine who posthumously received the Medal of Honor for heroism at the cost of his life while leading an assault during the raid on Makin Island on August 17, 1942. Thomason was the first enlisted Marine to receive the Medal of Honor during World War II.

== Early years; first Marine Corps service ==
Thomason was born in Atlanta, Georgia, on May 23, 1914. After graduating high school he traveled widely throughout the United States with his companions.

In December 1934 he enlisted in the United States Marine Corps in Savannah, Georgia. Although he was named for his father, at the time of his enlistment he dropped the "A" of his father's name and became known in the Marine Corps simply as Clyde Thomason. This was the name under which he enlisted in 1934 and was the name subsequently used in official Marine Corps records. He later served in the Marine detachment of the USS Augusta, Flagship of the Asiatic Fleet, and was honorably discharged in 1939 upon the expiration of his enlistment.

The day following his discharge, he was retained in the Fleet Marine Force Reserve. When he again became a civilian, he accepted a position with the Albany, Georgia, branch of the Fire Companies Adjustment Bureau, Inc., in February 1940.

== World War II ==
Thomason re-enlisted in the Marine Corps Reserve in January 1942 following the attack on Pearl Harbor. He asked for action, and when Lieutenant Colonel Evans Carlson was organizing his famous Raiders, Thomason volunteered.

Because he was so tall, 6 feet 4 inches (1.93 m), and weighed 190 pounds (86 kg); he had to ask for a height waiver to get into the Raiders. He received his training in California before going to the Pacific battlefields in April for duty with the 2nd Raider Battalion.

Letters that he wrote to friends in Albany, Georgia during the time of his service in the Pacific show that he wanted to be "where things are happening." He refused to accept assignments which would keep him away from action. He wrote of Carlson and of Major James Roosevelt, second in command.

During the raid on Makin Island, Carlson selected Thomason to lead the advance element against the Japanese garrison. Thomason was one of 30 Marines who did not return from the Makin Island raid. In November 1999, researchers discovered a mass grave on Makin Island that contained human remains, equipment, and dog tags belonging to Marine Raiders. Thomason's remains were among those identified. His remains were returned to the United States and were interred at Arlington National Cemetery on August 17, 2001.

== Honors and awards ==
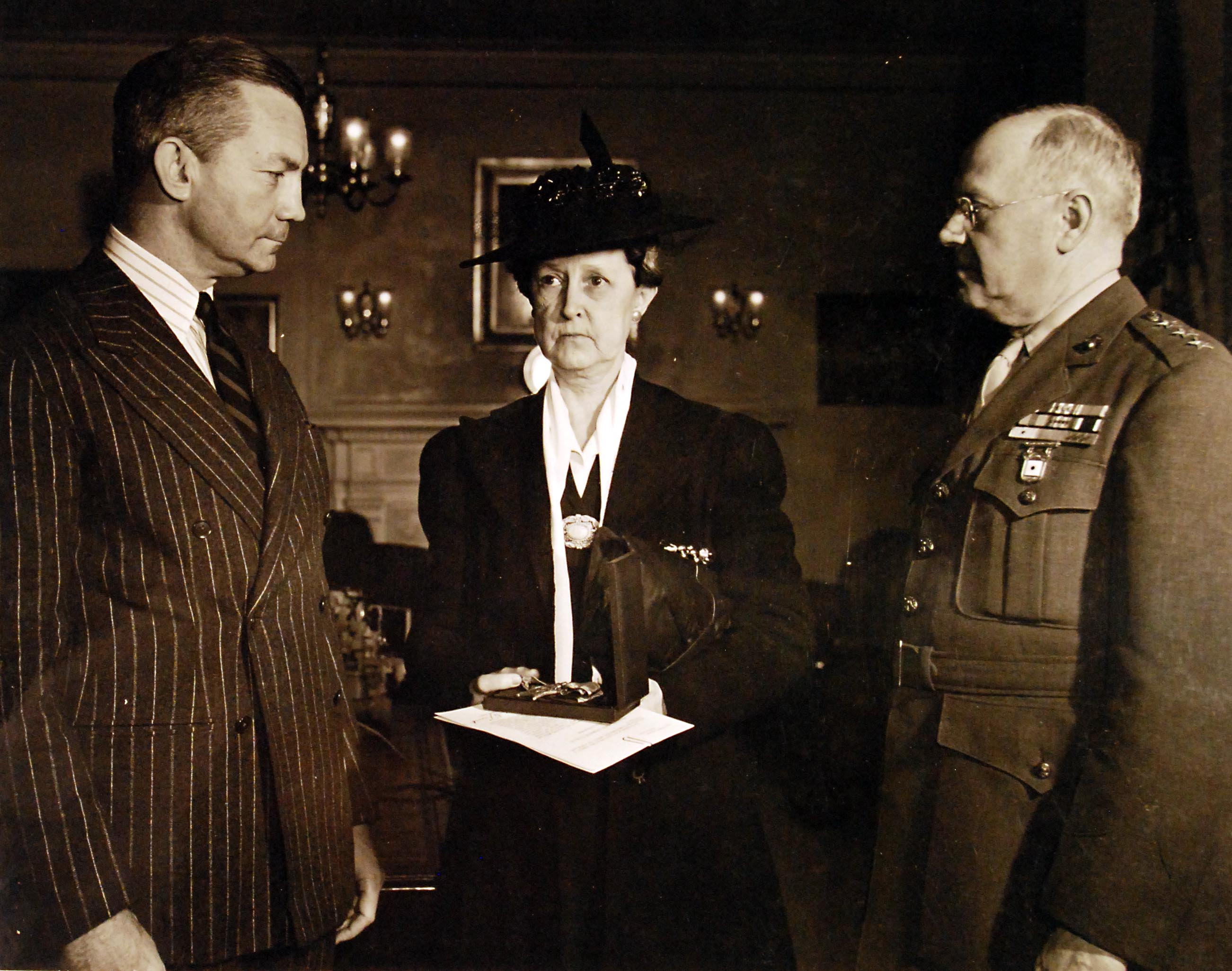
Amy M. Thomason receives her stepson's Medal of Honor from James Forrestal at a January 1943 ceremony in the Navy Department. Lieutenant General Thomas Holcomb (right), Commandant of the U.S. Marine Corps, was among those present.

The Medal of Honor was conferred posthumously and was presented to his stepmother by Under-Secretary of the Navy James Forrestal at ceremonies in January 1943 in Washington, DC.

Following his death, the people of Georgia bought a sufficient number of war bonds to purchase for the Navy a cruiser, the USS Atlanta. The bonds were oversubscribed, and there was money enough to pay the cost of two destroyer escorts, one of which, DE-203, was named the USS Thomason, launched at the Charleston Naval Shipyard in August 1943.

In 1957, in ceremonies at the Marine Corps Supply Center, Albany, Georgia, a new gymnasium building was formally dedicated in Thomason's name. In May 1984, a staff non-commissioned officers' barracks was named for Thomason at the Marine Corps Base Camp Smedley D. Butler. On December 17, 2004, the Sgt. Clyde Thomason Amphibious Skills Training Facility was dedicated on Coronado Island, California. On February 18, 2009, the Marine Corps League Detachment #1325 named in his honor was formed in Fayette County, Georgia.

The MARSOC Critical Skills Operator of the Year award presented by the Marine Corps Association was renamed in his honor to the Sergeant Clyde A. Thomason Marine Special Operator of the Year Special Operations Command Award.

=== Citation ===
The President of the United States takes pride in presenting the MEDAL OF HONOR posthumously to

SERGEANT CLYDE THOMASON
UNITED STATES MARINE CORPS RESERVE

for service as set forth in the following CITATION:

For conspicuous gallantry and intrepidity at the risk of his life above and beyond the call of duty while a member of the Second Marine Raider Battalion in action against the Japanese-held island of Makin on August 17–18, 1942. Landing the advance element of the assault echelon, Sergeant Thomason disposed his men with keen judgment and discrimination and by his exemplary leadership and great personal valor, exhorted them to like fearless efforts. On one occasion, he dauntlessly walked up to a house which concealed an enemy Japanese sniper, forced in the door and shot the man before he could resist. Later in the action, while leading an assault on enemy position, he gallantly gave up his life in the service of his country. His courage and loyal devotion to duty in the face of grave peril were in keeping with the finest traditions of the United States Naval Service.

=== Awards and decorations ===
Thomason received the following military awards:

	Medal of Honor	
Purple Heart Medal	Marine Corps Good Conduct Medal	China Service Medal
American Defense Service Medal	Asiatic-Pacific Campaign Medal with one bronze service star	World War II Victory Medal

== See also ==
- List of Medal of Honor recipients for World War II
