= Clyde River (Alberta) =

Stream in Alberta, Canada

Coordinates: 55.16691°N 111.70186°W

Clyde River is a stream in Alberta, Canada.

Clyde River has the name of Clyde White, a government surveyor.

== See also ==
- List of rivers of Alberta
