= USS Thomason =

Buckley-class destroyer escort

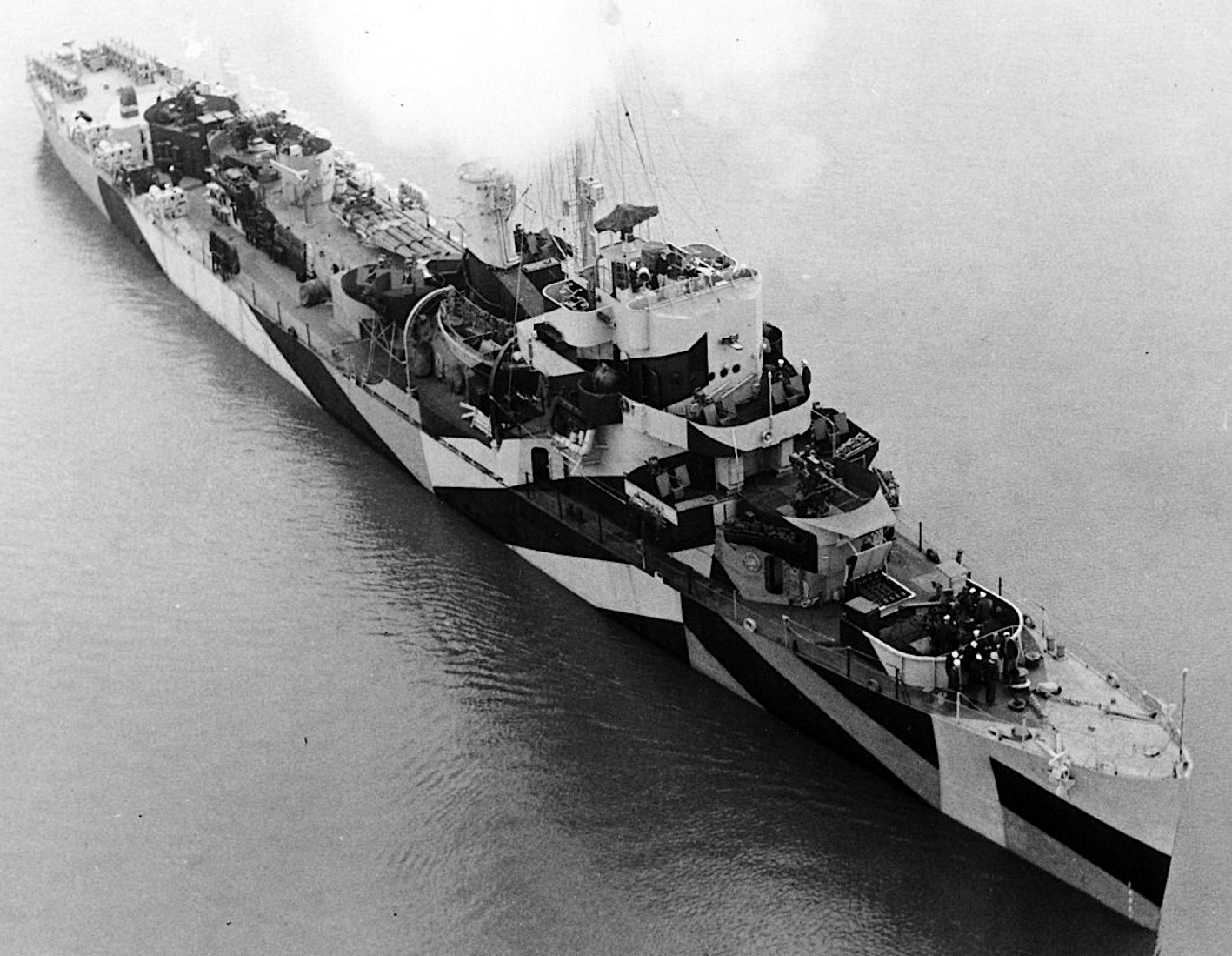

History

United States
- Laid down: 5 June 1943
- Launched: 23 August 1943
- Commissioned: 10 December 1943
- Decommissioned: 22 May 1946
- Stricken: 30 June 1968
- Fate: Sold for scrap, 30 June 1969

General characteristics
- Displacement: 1,740 tons full; 1,400 tons, standard
- Length: 306 ft (93 m)
- Beam: 37 ft (11.3 m)
- Draft: 13 ft 6 in (4.11 m)
- Propulsion: GE turbo-electric drive, 12,000 hp (8.9 MW); two propellers
- Speed: 23.6 knots (44 km/h)
- Range: 4,940 nautical miles at 12 knots; (9,200 km at 22 km/h)
- Complement: 15 officers, 198 men
- Armament: 3 × 3 in (76 mm)/50 DP guns, 3 × 21 in (53 cm) torpedo tubes, 1 × 1.1 in (28 mm)/75 quad AA gun, 8 × 20 mm cannon, 1 × hedgehog projector, 2 × depth charge tracks, 8 × K-gun depth charge projectors

USS Thomason (DE-203) was a Buckley-class destroyer escort in service with the United States Navy from 1943 to 1946. She was scrapped in 1969.

== History ==
USS Thomason was named in honor of Marine Raider Sergeant Clyde A. Thomason (1914–1942), the first Marine to be awarded the Medal of Honor in World War II – posthumously, for heroism during the Makin Island raid.

Thomason was laid down on 5 June 1943 at the Charleston Navy Yard; launched on 23 August 1943; sponsored by Miss Sara Jeanette Thomason; and commissioned on 10 December 1943.

=== Pacific War ===
The destroyer escort held shakedown training in the Bermuda area and performed convoy escort duty along the east coast from Newport, R.I., to Panama. She transited the Panama Canal on 21 March 1944 and headed for the New Hebrides. The ship called at Galapagos, the Society Islands, and Samoa before arriving at Espiritu Santo on 18 April. She joined the U.S. 3d Fleet and, in addition to performing antisubmarine duty in Indispensable Strait which separates Guadalcanal and Malaita Islands, escorted ships to Guadalcanal.

On 26 May, she arrived at Cape Cretin to join the U.S. 7th Fleet for operations along the coast of New Guinea. On 3 June, the ship got underway for Wakde and arrived there the following week. On the 13th, her gunners helped Army antiaircraft units repel an enemy air attack. Six days later, she took Army artillery observers along the coast to Sarmi where she shelled enemy emplacements and an air strip. The ship operated from Wakde until 7 August when she shifted her base of operations to Noemfoor, Schouten Islands. In early September, she returned to Espiritu Santo for an overhaul.

On 4 October, DE-203 stood out to sea to rendezvous with two ammunition ships to escort them to the Palaus. She remained at Kossol Passage for a month, serving as harbor entrance control ship before returning to Hollandia. On 6 November, the destroyer got underway for Maffin Bay. Two days later, Thomason and Neuendorf (DE-200) bombarded Sarmi and targets along the bay. With the aid of Army spotting planes, the two ships set fire to enemy storehouses and several other buildings.

Thomason headed for the Philippines on 9 November in the screen of a large convoy of landing craft and supply ships. She arrived in Leyte Gulf on the 15th and sailed the same day with a convoy bound for Hollandia. The destroyer escort then conducted intensive antiaircraft and antisubmarine training at Mios Woendi and landing exercises at Aitape with attack transports that were scheduled to participate in the invasion of Lingayen Gulf.

On 28 December 1944, the destroyer escort sortied for Luzon with Task Group 78.1 (TG 78.1), the San Fabian Attack Force. En route to the Philippines, she was detached to accompany two fuel oil tankers who were scheduled to refuel the escort ships of Task Force 79 (TF 79), which was also en route to Lingayen Gulf.

Thomason began antisubmarine patrols in Mangarin Bay, off Mindoro on 7 January 1945. One month later, she and Neuendorf began antisubmarine patrol duty off the west coast of Luzon. At 22:22 on 7 February, Thomason's SL surface radar made a contact at a range of 14 miles (26 km), which was thought to be a small boat. She closed the range and challenged the craft with a flashing light. There was no answer, and surface radar lost contact. However, sonar soon made an underwater contact.

The escort made a hedgehog run but did not fire because she was going too fast. She made another run and fired a pattern of hedgehogs. On both runs, a large submerged mass, outlined by phosphorescence, was seen moving through the water at a depth of between 25 and 50 feet. Four to six of the hedgehogs detonated almost simultaneously, and contact with the target was lost. A heavy oil slick, 250 yards in diameter, rose to the surface. The two ships patrolled until late in the morning, in an expanding search pattern, but never regained contact with the Japanese submarine. Ro-55 had been sunk in over 800 fathoms (4,800 ft; 1,500 m) of water.

Thomason returned to Mangarin Bay where she resumed antisubmarine patrols. On the 24th, she rescued four airmen who had bailed out of their burning B-24 Liberator bomber. From March through August, the ship was engaged in antisubmarine patrols and escort duty between various Philippine ports, Palau, and Hollandia. On 15 August 1945, the Japanese surrendered to the Allies. In September, she escorted two convoys from Luzon to Okinawa.

=== Decommissioning and fate ===
On 4 October, Thomason stood out of Subic Bay and headed for the United States. She called at San Francisco, California on the 27th and moved to San Diego for inactivation. Thomason was decommissioned on 22 May 1946 and struck from the Navy list on 30 June 1968. On 30 June 1969, she was sold to the National Metal & Steel Corp., Terminal Island, Long Beach, Calif., for scrap.

Thomason received three battle stars for World War II service.
