= Japanese destroyer Samidare =

Two Japanese destroyers have borne the name Samidare:

- Japanese destroyer Samidare (1935) was a Shiratsuyu-class destroyer launched in 1935 and sunk in 1944.
- JS Samidare (DD-106) is a Murasame-class destroyer launched in 1998.
