= Clyde (1894 ship) =

History

United Kingdom
- Name: Clyde
- Owner: Nourse Line
- Builder: Russell & Company, Port Glasgow, Scotland
- Launched: 25 July 1894

Norway
- Fate: Scrapped 1925

General characteristics
- Class & type: Iron hulled sailing ship
- Tons burthen: 1,840
- Length: 270 ft 9 in (82.5 m)
- Beam: 39 ft (12 m)
- Draught: 22 ft 5 in (6.8 m)

Clyde was built by Russell & Company, Port Glasgow, Scotland, for the Nourse Line, and named after the River Clyde flowing through Glasgow, and launched on 25 July 1894. The Clyde was the last sailing ship built for the Nourse Line. She was primarily used for the transportation of Indian indentured labourers to the colonies. Details of some of these voyages are as follows:

Destination	Date of Arrival	Number of Passengers	Deaths During Voyage
Fiji	1 June 1897	670	n/a
Trinidad	16 February 1902	574	4
Suriname	14 December 1904	n/a	n/a

On 9 March 1906 she ran aground at Cape Hatteras, en route from Barbados to New York. She was refloated on 9 May 1906 and taken to New York for repairs. On 31 July 1906 she was sold to M & G.R. Clover of London. She was resold a number of times to different Norwegian owners and broken up in 1924.

== See also ==
- Indian Indenture Ships to Fiji
