= Clyde, Pennsylvania =

Unincorporated area in Pennsylvania, U.S.

Coordinates: 40.449694°N 79.069988°W

Clyde is an unincorporated area in Indiana County, in the U.S. state of Pennsylvania.

== History ==
A post office called Clyde was established in 1882, and remained in operation until 1955. The origin of the name Clyde is obscure; it may be named after the River Clyde in Scotland.
