= Clyde (1802 ship) =

History

United Kingdom
- Name: Clyde
- Builder: J. Gilmore & Co., Calcutta
- Launched: 26 January 1802
- Fate: Lost 1804

General characteristics
- Tons burthen: 600, or 602, or 620, or 700 (bm)
- Propulsion: Sail
- Notes: Three decks; teak-built

Clyde was launched at Calcutta in 1802 and cost sicca rupees 76,000 to build. In 1803 Clyde was listed as belonging to the port of Calcutta with George McCall, master, and Gilmore & Wilson, owners.

Captain George McCall sailed her from Calcutta on 18 February 1802, bound for London, on a voyage for the British East India Company. She reached Saint Helena on 12 May (and left on 23 May), and arrived at Blackwall on 22 July. She was admitted to the Registry of Great Britain on 5 August 1802. Clyde entered Lloyd's Register in 1802 with G. McCall, master. Before she left for her return voyage she paid £1037 13s 7d on 3 September to David Scott & Co. or Fairlie Bonham & Co. for outfitting.

Clyde was lost in 1804 on a voyage to China. (Note: The House of Commons Select Committee report lists her among vessels lost, burnt, or taken, but without a date of loss or other details.) (Note: By one account a French privateer captured her in 1809 off Sumatra, but that account is in error. The captured Clyde was of 310 tons (bm).)
