= Thomas Clyde =

Thomas Clyde may refer to:

- Thomas Clyde (businessman) (1812–1885), American ship owner
- Thomas Clyde (film producer) (1917–1999), British film producer
- Thomas W. Clyde (skipjack), a Chesapeake Bay skipjack
