= James Clyde =

James Clyde may refer to:

- James Clyde (actor), British actor
- James Avon Clyde, Lord Clyde (1863–1944), Scottish politician and judge
- James Latham Clyde, Lord Clyde (1898–1975), Scottish Unionist politician and judge
- James Clyde, Baron Clyde (1932–2009), Scottish judge and British law lord
- J. Clyde Mitchell (James Clyde Mitchell, 1918–1995), British sociologist and anthropologist
