= Clyde (1820 ship) =

History

United Kingdom
- Name: Clyde
- Owner: 1820:John Scott & Sons; 1820:Joseph Hare (Principal Managing Owner); 1830:Fairlie & Co.; 1835:Chaloner
- Builder: John Scott & Sons Greenock, Scotland
- Launched: 24 March 1820
- Fate: Last listed in Lloyd's Register in 1845

General characteristics
- Tons burthen: 451, or 47866/94 or 490, or 500 (bm)
- Propulsion: Sail

Clyde was a merchant ship built at Greenock, Scotland in 1820. She made two voyages for the British East India Company (EIC). She then made three voyages transporting convicts from England and Ireland to Australia. She was last listed in 1845.

== Career ==
Clyde enters Lloyd's Register in 1820 with T. Blair, master, Scott & Co., owner, and trade London–India.

EIC voyage #1 (1820–1821): Captain Thomas Blair sailed from The Downs on 10 July 1820, bound for Bengal and Madras. Clyde was at Madeira on 28 July and St Paul Island on 18 October. She arrived at Calcutta on 11 December. Homeward bound, she was at Diamond Harbour on 21 January 1821. She was at Madras on 18 February and Colombo on 6 March. She reached St Helena on 31 May, and Blackwall on 4 August.

EIC voyage #2 (1825–1826): Captain Daniel Nesbitt Munro sailed from Deptford on 27 August 1825, bound for Bengal. Clyde was at Torbay on 21 October and arrived at Calcutta on 10 March 1826.

Lloyd's Register for both 1830 and 1831 show Clyde's master as Munro and her owner as Fairlie & Co. However, between the two volumes her trade changes from London–India to London–New South Wales.

Convict voyage #1 (1830): On her first convict voyage, under the command of Daniel Munro and surgeon Morgan Price, she departed Portsmouth on 30 August 1830 and arrived in Hobart Town on 18 December. She embarked 216 male convicts and there were no convict deaths en route.

Convict voyage #2 (1832): On her second convict voyage, again under the command of Daniel Munro and surgeon George Fairfowl, she departed Portsmouth on 9 May 1832 arrived in Sydney on 27 August. She had embarked 200 male convicts and had one convict death en route.

Lloyd's Register for 1835 shows Clyde with J. Brown, master, Chaloner, owner, homeport Liverpool, and trade Liverpool–Quebec.

Convict voyage #3 (1838): On her third convict voyage, under the command of John Matches and surgeon John Smith, she departed Dublin, Ireland on the 11 May 1838 and arrived in Sydney on 10 September. She had embarked 215 male convicts and there were no convict deaths en route. Clyde departed Port Jackson, bound for Java on 9 October 1838.
