= Clyde's Adventure =

1992 video game

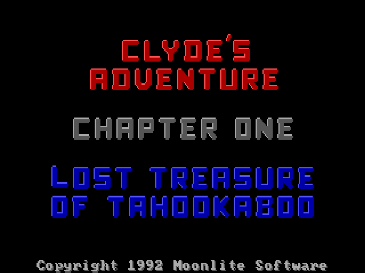
- Developer: Moonlite Software
- Publisher: Moonlite Software
- Designer: Michael Voss
- Artist: Michael Voss
- Composer: Jim Dosé
- Platform: MS-DOS
- Release: 1992
- Genre: Platform
- Mode: Single-player

Clyde's Adventure is a platform game released for IBM PC compatibles by Moonlite Software in 1992. Originally, Episode 1 was shareware, while Episode 2 was available only upon registration. Moonlite software has since released the entire game as freeware.

== Gameplay ==
The objective of the game is to explore castles, collect gems, and find the exit.

Clyde, the main character, has a supply of energy that depletes whenever he walks, jumps, or falls from a great height. If his energy reaches 0, Clyde dies with a shriek. With no "enemies", Clyde's Adventure is predominantly a puzzle game. The challenge comes from avoiding traps, using Clyde's magic wand to manipulate the environment, and finding the most efficient route before Clyde runs out of energy.

The game has two chapters, "Lost Treasure of Tahookaboo" and "The Vanished King", each containing 16 castles.

== Legacy ==
A sequel, Clyde's Revenge, was released in 1995.

In 2012 there was an attempt to finance a version for modern platforms with new features, named Clyde's Adventure Reborn, via crowdfunding on Kickstarter.
