= USS Clyde =

USS Clyde has been the name of two ships in the United States Navy.

- USS Clyde (1863), a side wheel steamer, captured by the Union Navy as Neptune on 14 June 1863, which served though the remainder of the American Civil War.
- USS Clyde (IX-144), served as a station tanker from 1944 until 1946.
