= Clyde (1871 ship) =

Steamship wrecked at Dyer Island in 1879

Coordinates: 34°40′16″S 19°25′33″E

History

United Kingdom
- Name: City of Poona
- Owner: Smith George and Company
- Builder: Charles Connell and Company, Scotstoun
- Laid down: 1870
- Launched: 1871
- Out of service: Sold 1878

History
- Name: Clyde
- Owner: Temperleys, Carter and Drake
- Acquired: 1878
- Fate: Sunk 3 April 1879

General characteristics
- Tonnage: 2256 grt
- Length: 99.06 metres (325.0 ft)
- Beam: 10.97 metres (36.0 ft)
- Propulsion: 2-cylinder compound steam engine driving a single screw

The SS Clyde was a steamship, launched as the SS City of Poona in 1871. She was operated by Smith George and Company until 1878 when she was sold to Temperleys, Carter and Drake and renamed. Clyde served as a troopship in 1879, taking British Army reinforcements to Southern Africa for the Anglo-Zulu War. She ran aground on a reef off Dyer Island of 3 April and sank. Her entire complement were saved, being ferried to the mainland by the Clyde's boats. HMS Tamar arrived the following day to embark the troops for the front.

== Construction ==
The City of Poona was built by Charles Connell and Company at Scotstoun on the River Clyde from 1870. She was launched in 1871. City of Poona had a 2-cylinder compound steam engine and was propelled by a single screw up to 12 knots (22 km/h; 14 mph). She measured 99.06 metres (325.0 ft) in length and 10.97 metres (36.0 ft) in beam. The City of Poona had a gross register tonnage of 2,256, her yard number was 74 and her official number was 63811.

City of Poona entered into service with Smith George and Company in 1871. In 1878 she was bought by Temperleys, Carter and Drake and renamed Clyde.

== Wreck ==
The 1st battalion of the 24th Regiment of Foot had suffered heavy casualties in the 22 January 1879 Battle of Isandlwana. The British Army pulled raw recruits and men from the depots of other regiments into a draft to be sent to the Colony of Natal to reinforce the unit ahead of a second invasion of Zululand. Some 541 officers and men were put aboard the Clyde in England for the journey to Southern Africa.

The Clyde reached Dyer Island located 4.8 kilometres (3 mi) off the African mainland and around 110 kilometres (70 mi) south-east of Simon's Town on the morning of 3 April. At around 4:30 am she ran aground on a reef between the island and the mainland. The situation was quickly seen to be serious and the ship's boats were used to ferry men to the mainland from 6:20 am, starting with the sick. Calm sea helped the evacuation and all troops, bar a working party kept aboard, were off by 11:30 am. The remaining men worked to rescue the troops' baggage until 1:30 pm when it was judged that the ship was sinking beyond recovery. The last men were then ferried ashore. None of the passengers or crew were lost in the sinking. The men chose a campsite some 3.2 kilometres (2 mi) inland, to which the surviving baggage was carried using a local farmer's waggon.

At 8:00 am the chief officer of the Clyde had set off in a boat for Simon's Town to raise the alarm. He reported to the senior Royal Navy officer there at 10:30 pm and HMS Tamar was dispatched to the scene. The Tamar arrived at 9:00 am on 4 April to see only the masts and funnel of the Clyde now visible. The troops were embarked on the Tamar with the process almost complete by 1:30 pm when HMS Tenedos arrived on the scene.

== Aftermath ==
The sinking of the Clyde was the second maritime incident to affect the second invasion; the SS City of Paris (1865), carrying troops and supplies, had run aground in Simon's Bay on 23 March. She had also suffered no casualties and had been rescued by HMS Tamar.

All of the stores aboard Clyde, which included large quantities of small arms ammunition, were lost. The incident also caused a delay in the arrival of the reinforcements to Natal. Tamar and Tenedos had to return to Simon's Town before carrying the men to Durban, arriving on 7 April.

One of the draft, Lieutenant Jahleel Brenton Carey, fresh out of the Staff College, Camberley, was commended for his actions during the sinking. His appointment as Deputy Assistant Quartermaster-General to Lord Chelmsford's staff may have been in recognition of this. Carey was court-martialled later in the campaign for actions relating to the death in combat of Napoléon, Prince Imperial.
