= Clyde (community), Iowa County, Wisconsin =

Clyde, Wisconsin
- Unincorporated community
- Location within Wisconsin Location within the United States
- Coordinates: 43°07′10″N 90°12′41″W
- Country: United States
- State: Wisconsin
- County: Iowa
- Town: Clyde
- Elevation: 735 ft (224 m)
- Time zone: UTC-6 (Central (CST))
  - Summer (DST): UTC-5 (CDT)
- Area code: 608
- GNIS feature ID: 1577550

Clyde is an unincorporated community located in the town of Clyde, Iowa County, Wisconsin, United States. Clyde is located at the junction of Wisconsin Highway 130 and County Highway I along Otter Creek, 11.7 miles (18.8 km) north-northwest of Dodgeville. The community was named by Seth Champion, a director of the Kewaunee, Green Bay & Western railroad in the 1890s, for his son Clyde.
