= Clyde, Wisconsin =

- Town
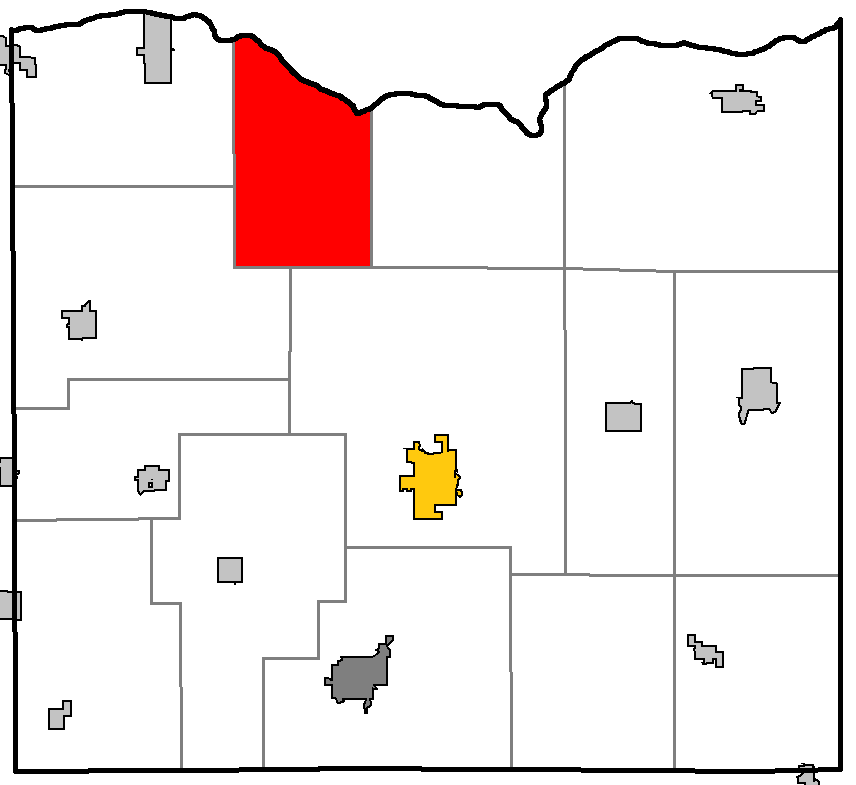
- Location of Clyde, within Iowa County, Wisconsin

- Location of Iowa County, Wisconsin
- Coordinates: 43°7′56″N 90°13′45″W
- Country: United States
- State: Wisconsin
- County: Iowa

Area
  - Total: 34.6 sq mi (89.7 km^{2})
  - Land: 34.1 sq mi (88.4 km^{2})
  - Water: 0.50 sq mi (1.3 km^{2})
- Elevation: 748 ft (228 m)

Population (2020)
  - Total: 292
  - Density: 8.56/sq mi (3.30/km^{2})
- Time zone: UTC-6 (Central (CST))
  - Summer (DST): UTC-5 (CDT)
- Area code: 608
- FIPS code: 55-15875
- GNIS feature ID: 1582990
- Website: https://townofclyde.wordpress.com/

Clyde is a town in Iowa County, Wisconsin, United States. The population was 292 at the 2020 census. The unincorporated community of Clyde is located in the town. The town was named by Seth Champion, a director of the Kewaunee, Green Bay & Western railroad in the 1890s, for his son Clyde.

== Geography ==
According to the United States Census Bureau, the town has a total area of 34.6 square miles (89.7 km^{2}), of which 34.1 square miles (88.4 km^{2}) is land and 0.5 square mile (1.3 km^{2}) (1.44%) is water. Clyde is located in the Driftless Area, a geographical region unaffected by glaciers during the last ice age. Otter Creek and Penn Hollow Creek flow through the area.

== Demographics ==
As of the census of 2000, there were 322 people, 127 households, and 91 families residing in the town. The population density was 9.4 people per square mile (3.6/km^{2}). There were 162 housing units at an average density of 4.7 per square mile (1.8/km^{2}). The racial makeup of the town was 97.52% White, 0.93% African American, 0.93% Asian, 0.31% from other races, and 0.31% from two or more races. Hispanic or Latino of any race were 0.93% of the population.

There were 127 households, out of which 31.5% had children under the age of 18 living with them, 59.1% were married couples living together, 7.9% had a female householder with no husband present, and 28.3% were non-families. 21.3% of all households were made up of individuals, and 7.1% had someone living alone who was 65 years of age or older. The average household size was 2.54 and the average family size was 2.92.

In the town, the population was spread out, with 24.2% under the age of 18, 5.9% from 18 to 24, 28.0% from 25 to 44, 27.6% from 45 to 64, and 14.3% who were 65 years of age or older. The median age was 42 years. For every 100 females, there were 110.5 males. For every 100 females age 18 and over, there were 112.2 males.

The median income for a household in the town was $50,625, and the median income for a family was $57,969. Males had a median income of $37,188 versus $27,917 for females. The per capita income for the town was $27,920. About 2.4% of families and 6.0% of the population were below the poverty line, including none of those under age 18 and 6.0% of those age 65 or over.
