= List of monuments to Arthur Wellesley, 1st Duke of Wellington =

The following is a list in chronological order of monuments to Arthur Wellesley, 1st Duke of Wellington (1769–1852), a leading British political and military figure of the 19th century, particularly noted for his defeat of Napoleon in the Battle of Waterloo in 1815:

== List of monuments ==
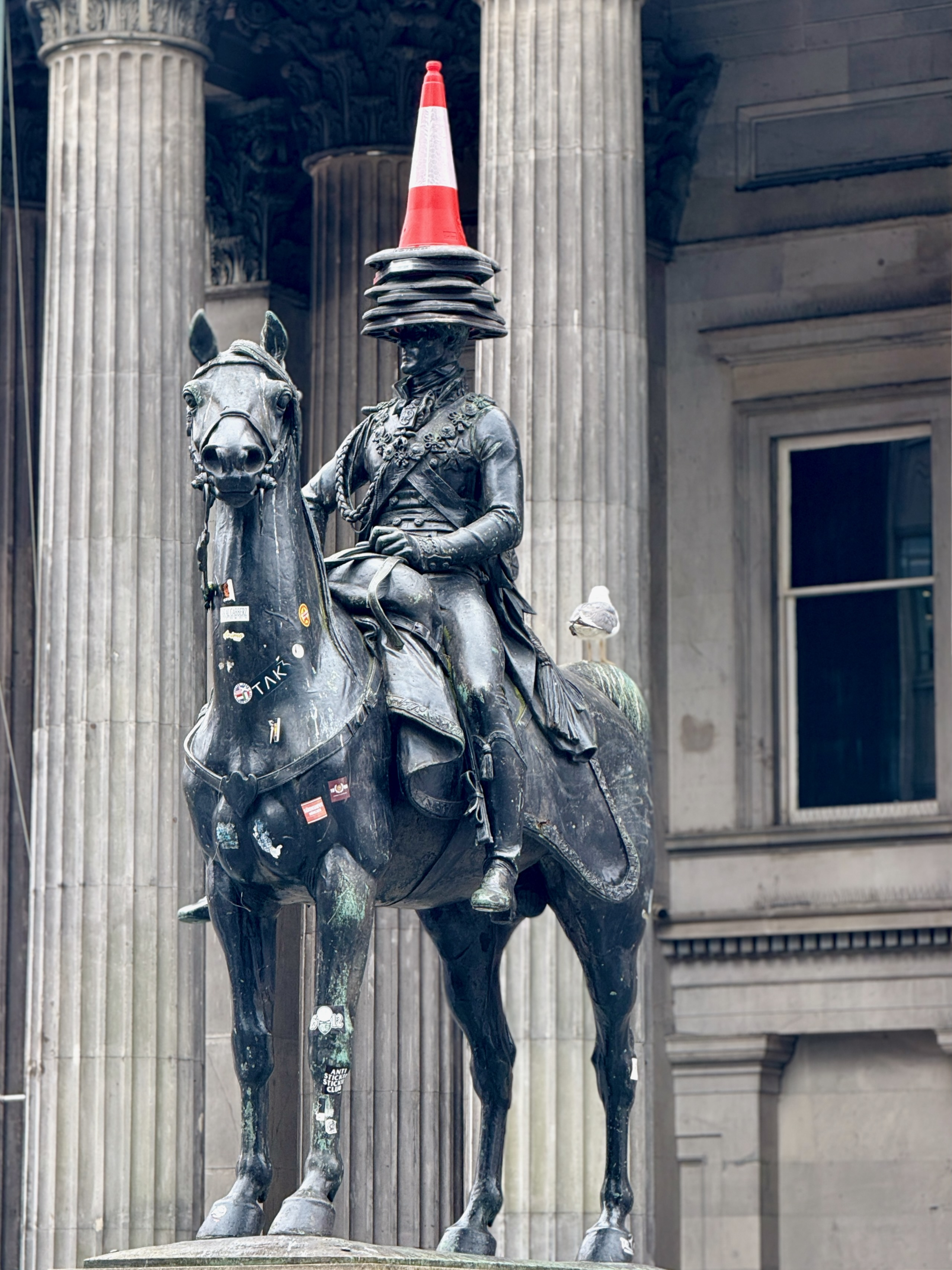
Wellington statue with traffic cone hat in Glasgow, Scotland

- A large stone monument built upon the Iron Age hill fort of Pen Dinas overlooking Cardigan Bay and the Welsh town of Aberystwyth. The monument takes the form of an eighteen metre high upended cannon. It is thought that the column was intended to carry at statue at the top, which was never installed. (1850s)
- A monumental column and statue in his birthplace in Trim, County Meath, Ireland (1817)
- The Rotunda, Woolwich Common, London, designed by John Nash (1814, re-erected 1819). Originally constructed as a temporary pavilion for the grand fête celebrating Wellington's victories in 1814, the structure was dismantled and permanently re-erected on Woolwich Common to serve as the Royal Artillery Museum. Nash employed pioneering structural techniques including laminated timber construction for the building's innovative roof design. The Rotunda remained in use as a museum until 1999 and is now a Grade II* listed building.
- Wellington Monument, London, on Park Lane, London; a colossal bronze statue of Achilles by Richard Westmacott (1822)
- Wellington Arch on Hyde Park Corner, London, built to a design by Decimus Burton (1825–1827)
- Equestrian statue of the Duke of Wellington, City of London, by Francis Leggatt Chantrey (1844) This equestrian statue has "Erected June 16, 1844" inscribed into its plinth.
- Wellington Monument, Old Woodhall Road, Woodhall Spa, Lincolnshire, a column with bust on top (1844)
- Equestrian statue of the Duke of Wellington, Glasgow, by Carlo Marochetti (1844). The Royal Exchange Square, Queen Street, in Glasgow, Scotland, has a statue of Wellington astride a horse, outside the Gallery of Modern Art. The statue does feature the bicorne cocked hat associated with him, but it is in his hand, not on his head. The statue is often "defaced" by the placing of a traffic cone on Wellington's head.

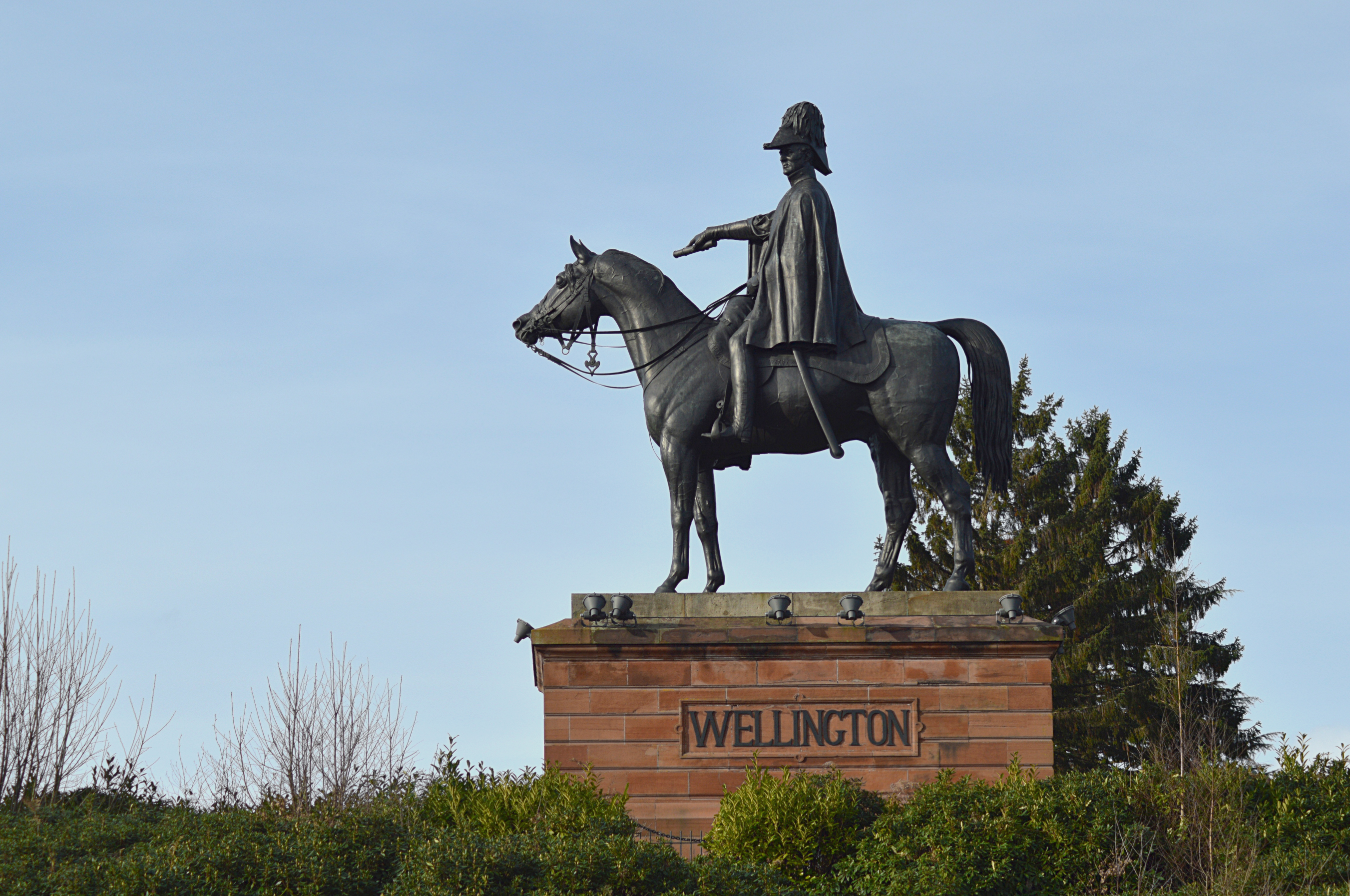
Wellington astride Copenhagen his charger statue on Round Hill, Aldershot.

- Equestrian statue of the Duke of Wellington, Aldershot, originally at Hyde Park Corner, by Matthew Cotes Wyatt (1846). In 1838 a proposal to build a statue of Wellington resulted in the building of a giant statue of him on his horse Copenhagen, placed above the Wellington Arch at Constitution Hill in London directly outside Apsley House, his former London home. Completed in 1846, the enormous scale of the 40 ton, 30 feet (9 m) high monument resulted in its removal in 1883, and the following year it was transported to Aldershot where it still stands near the Royal Garrison Church.
- A statue of Wellington by the sculptor Thomas Milnes at Woolwich Arsenal, which now stands in Wellington Park (1848)

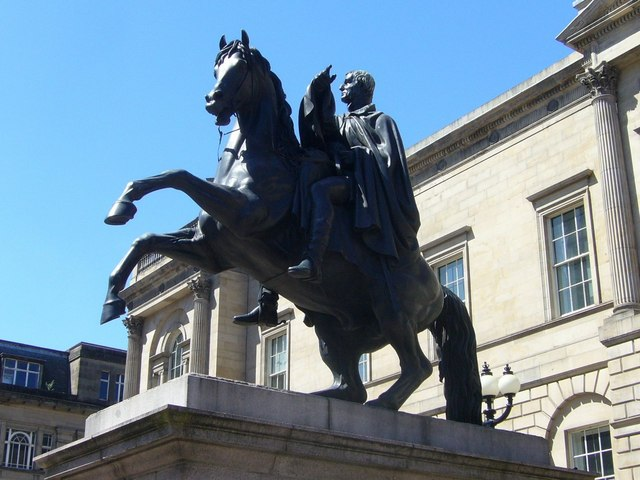
Wellington statue, in the East End of Edinburgh, Scotland

- Equestrian statue of the Duke of Wellington, East End of Princes Street, Edinburgh, by Sir John Steell (1848–52)
- Wellington Monument, Somerset, in the Blackdown Hills (commenced 1817, completed in 1854). This monument overlooks the town of Wellington, Somerset, from which Wellington's title was taken.
- A statue of Wellington by the sculptor Carlo Marochetti in Leeds, England, which now stands in Woodhouse Moor park (1855). His boots have been painted red, presumably by local students.
- A statue in Piccadilly Gardens, Manchester, by Matthew Noble (1855/6)

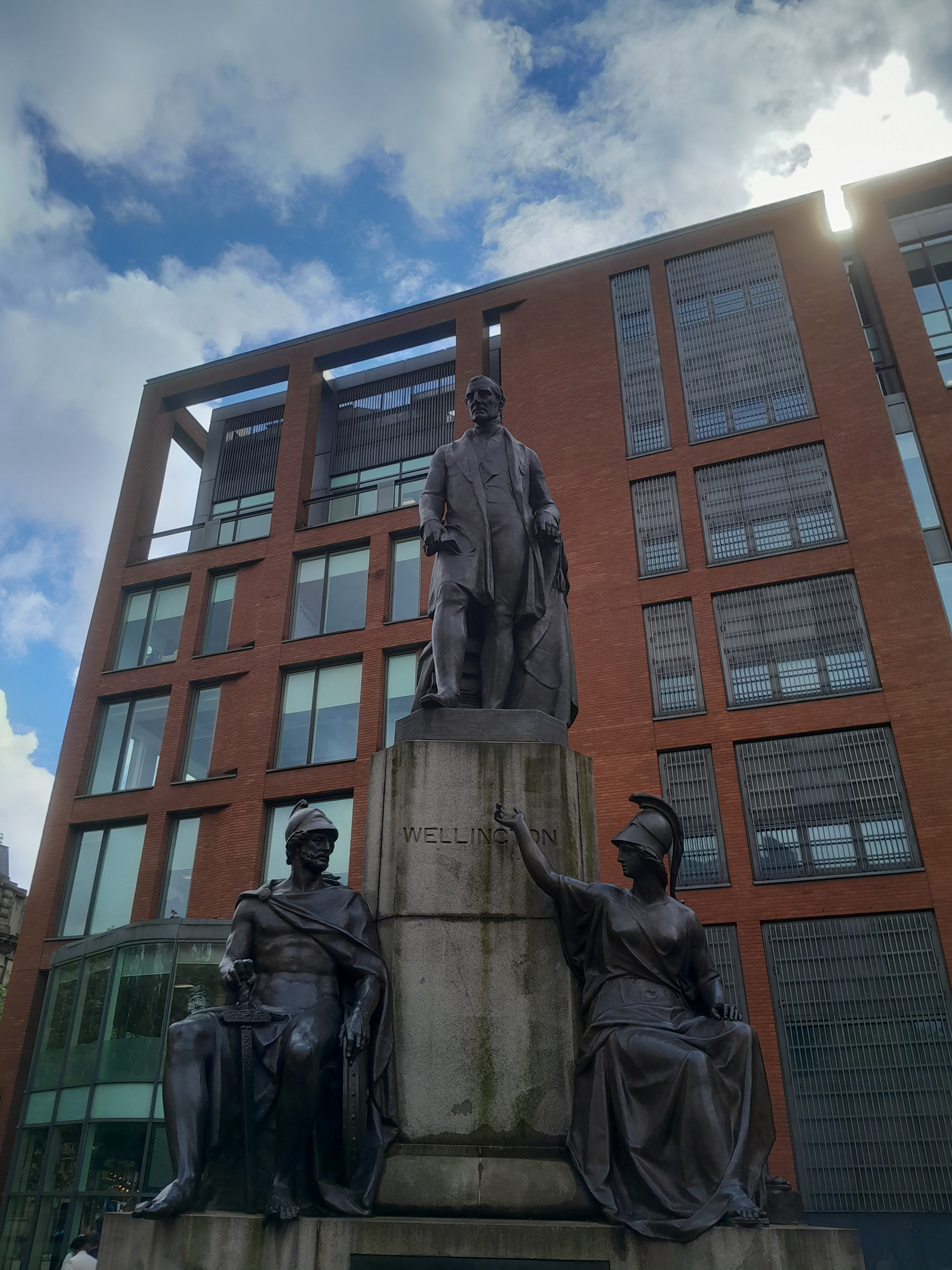
Wellington Monument in Piccadilly Gardens, Manchester

- A monument in the Great Hall of the Guildhall, London, by John Bell (1856)
- Duke of Wellington Statue, The Bulwark, Brecon, Wales, by John Evan Thomas (1858)

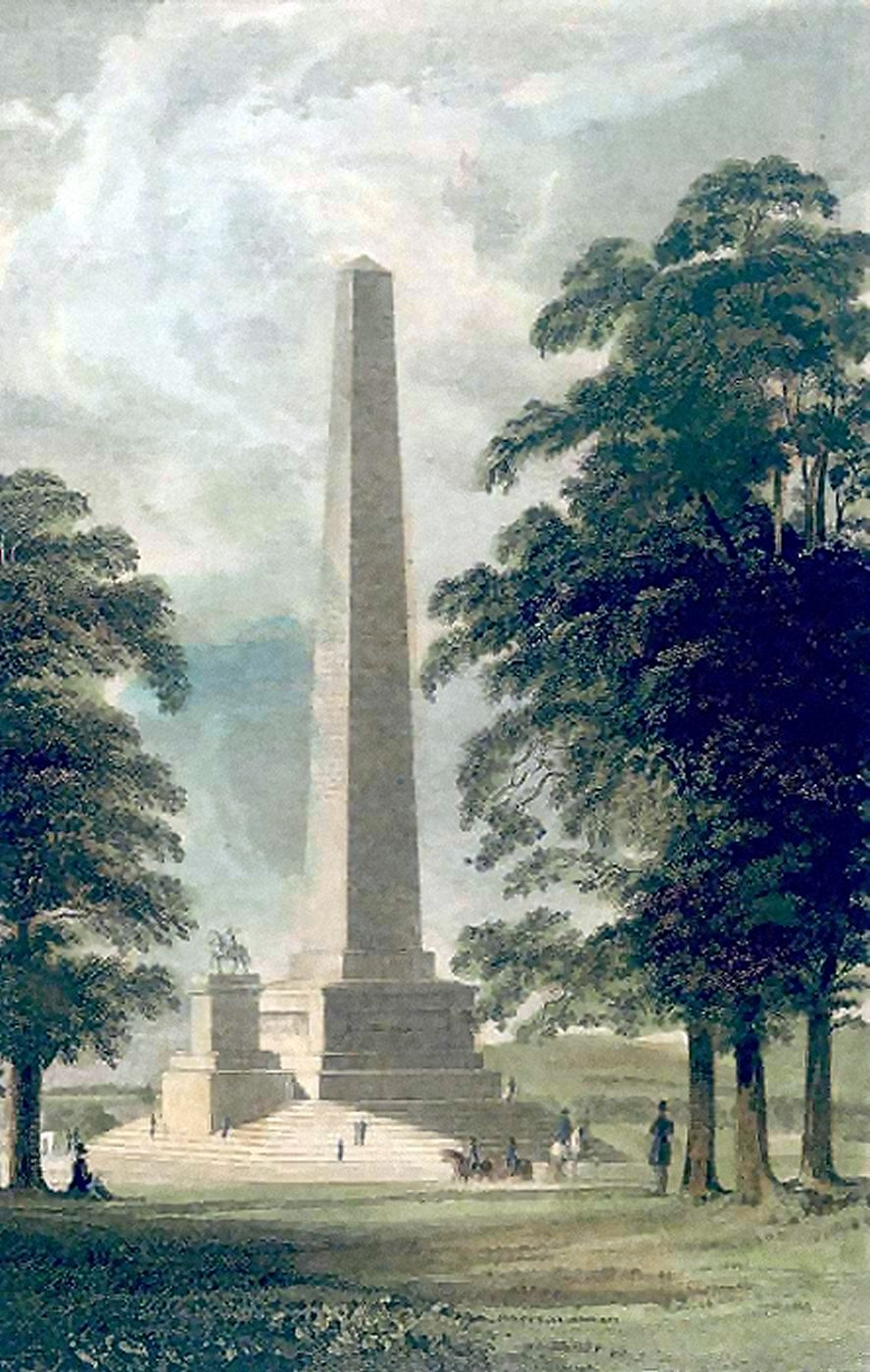
Engraving of Dublin's Wellington Testimonial including the never completed equestrian statue

- Wellington Monument, Dublin, by Robert Smirke (commenced 1817, completed 1861). This memorial in Phoenix Park is the tallest stone obelisk in Europe
- Duke of Wellington Commemorative Column, outside Stratfield Saye House, the Duke's Hampshire residence, a column with statue on top, by Carlo Marochetti (1863)
- Wellington's Column in Liverpool by Mr George and Andrew Lawson (1865)
- Wellington Monument, Baslow, Derbyshire. A stone cross (1866)
- Equestrian statue of the Duke of Wellington, Hyde Park Corner, London, by Joseph Boehm (1888)
- A monument in St Paul's Cathedral, London, where he is buried. By Alfred Stevens (completed 1912)
- A bust in Porto where he led Anglo-Portuguese troops against French troops in the 1809 in the Second Battle of Porto, Portugal
- The Duke's horse, Copenhagen, has a monument over his grave at Stratfield Saye House, Hampshire
- Stone statue of the Duke leaning against Copenhagen in Lower Newmarket Street, Falkirk, Stirlingshire.
- A bust in Alameda Gardens, Gibraltar.

== See also ==
- List of titles and honours of Arthur Wellesley, 1st Duke of Wellington
- Wellington (disambiguation)
- Waterloo Memorial (disambiguation)
