= List of Commonwealth Games mascots =

Since 1978, the Commonwealth Games have had an official mascot in each edition, although prior editions have also had unofficial mascots.

== Commonwealth Games mascots ==
Edition	Host	Name	Description	Image	Refs.
1970	(Scotland) Edinburgh	Wee Mannie (unofficial)	Wee Mannie is an anthropomorphic haggis. He was chosen from a design competition launched in 1969, but ultimately went unused due to multiple letters complaining about the design.		
1970	(Scotland) Edinburgh	Dunky Dick (unofficial)	Dunky Dick was a large Teddy bear dressed in a navy vest, shorts, and a tartan scarf.		
1974	(New Zealand) Christchurch	Shiwi (unofficial)	Shiwi is a kiwi made of sheepskin. It was not used in any official capacity.		
1978	(Canada) Edmonton	Keyano	Keyano is a grizzly bear and his name means "unity" in the Cree language. He was the first official Commonwealth Games mascot.		
1982	(Australia) Brisbane	Matilda	Matilda debuted as a 13-meter tall red kangaroo sculpture at the 1982 Commonwealth Games opening ceremony. She held many children dressed as joeys inside of her pouch.		
1986	(Scotland) Edinburgh	Mac	Mac is an anthropomorphic white Scottish Terrier dog. A live black Scottish Terrier was also used as a mascot. Memorabilia of Mac such as toys and pins were produced and sold.		
1990	(New Zealand) Auckland	Goldie	Goldie is an anthropomorphic kiwi with brown feathers and a yellow beak. Originally serving as the mascot of the 1990 Commonwealth Games, the character returned in 2024 as the mascot of the New Zealand Olympic team.		
1994	(Canada) Victoria	Klee Wyck	Klee Wyck is an anthropomorphic orca. His name comes from the Nuu-chah-nulth language and means "the laughing one".		
1998	(Malaysia) Kuala Lumpur	Wira	Wira is an anthropomorphic Bornean orangutan. His name means "warrior" or "hero" in the Malay language.		
2002	(England) Manchester	Kit	Kit is an anthropomorphic Devon Rex cat. He has a sidekick named "Mad Ferret".		
2006	(Australia) Melbourne	Karak	Karak is a red-tailed black cockatoo. His backstory states that he came from "Stringy Bark Lane", which was cleared away, causing him grief. He had a grandmother that made seed cakes, a mother that started a family when she was young, two brothers that were shuttlecocks, and a sister that performed well in school.		
2010	(India) Delhi	Shera	Shera is an anthropomorphic Bengal tiger. He was designed to embody "majesty, courage, power and grace".		
2014	(Scotland) Glasgow	Clyde	Clyde is an anthropomorphic thistle, the first official non-animal mascot of the Commonwealth Games. He was designed by the 12-year-old Beth Gilmour, who won a nationwide competition. Multiple statues of Clyde were placed across Glasgow.		
2018	(Australia) Gold Coast	Borobi	Borobi is a koala with blue fur and markings on his paws designed by Aboriginal artist Chern'ee Sutton. The name Borobi is derived from the language of the Yugambeh people, an indigenous Australian group from the Gold Coast region. In 2019, Borobi was announced to serve as the animated "Indigenous language champion" to promote the local Yugambeh language and culture. The first annual "Borobi Day" was celebrated on 31 May 2019 in order to raise awareness of indigenous languages in Australia.		
2022	(England) Birmingham	Perry	Perry is a multicolored bull mascot designed by the 10-year-old Emma Lou, who won a national design competition. He is named after the Perry Barr area of Birmingham.		
2026	(Scotland) Glasgow	Finnie	Finnie is a unicorn, the national animal of Scotland, with a traffic cone for a horn. She is named after the Finnieston Crane, a disused crane in the middle of Glasgow. Her traffic cone horn is a reference to a local tradition of putting a traffic cone on the head of the Duke of Wellington statue outside of the Gallery of Modern Art.		

== Commonwealth Youth Games mascots ==
Edition	Host	Name	Description	Image	Refs.
2004	(Australia) Bendigo	Ausca	Ausca is an anthropomorphic sugar glider. He has grey and white fur and pink paws and ears.		
2008	(India) Pune	Jigrr	Jigrr is an anthropomorphic Bengal tiger and the younger brother of Shera, the mascot of the 2010 Delhi games.		
2011	Isle of Man	Tosha	Tosha is an anthropomorphic Manx cat. His name means "the first" in the Manx language. He is featured on a commemorative two pound coin that was issued in 2011.		
2017	(The Bahamas) Nassau	Chickee	Chickee is an anthropomorphic Chickcharney, a mythical creature from Bahamian folklore. She was designed by a Bahamian artist named Kishan Munroe.		
2023	Trinidad and Tobago	Cocoyea	Cocoyea is an anthropomorphic leatherback sea turtle. He was based on the design of an artist named Djibril Annisette from Port of Spain.		

== See also ==
- List of Olympic mascots
- List of Paralympic mascots
