= William Rivers (Royal Navy officer) =

British Royal Navy lieutenant (1788–1856

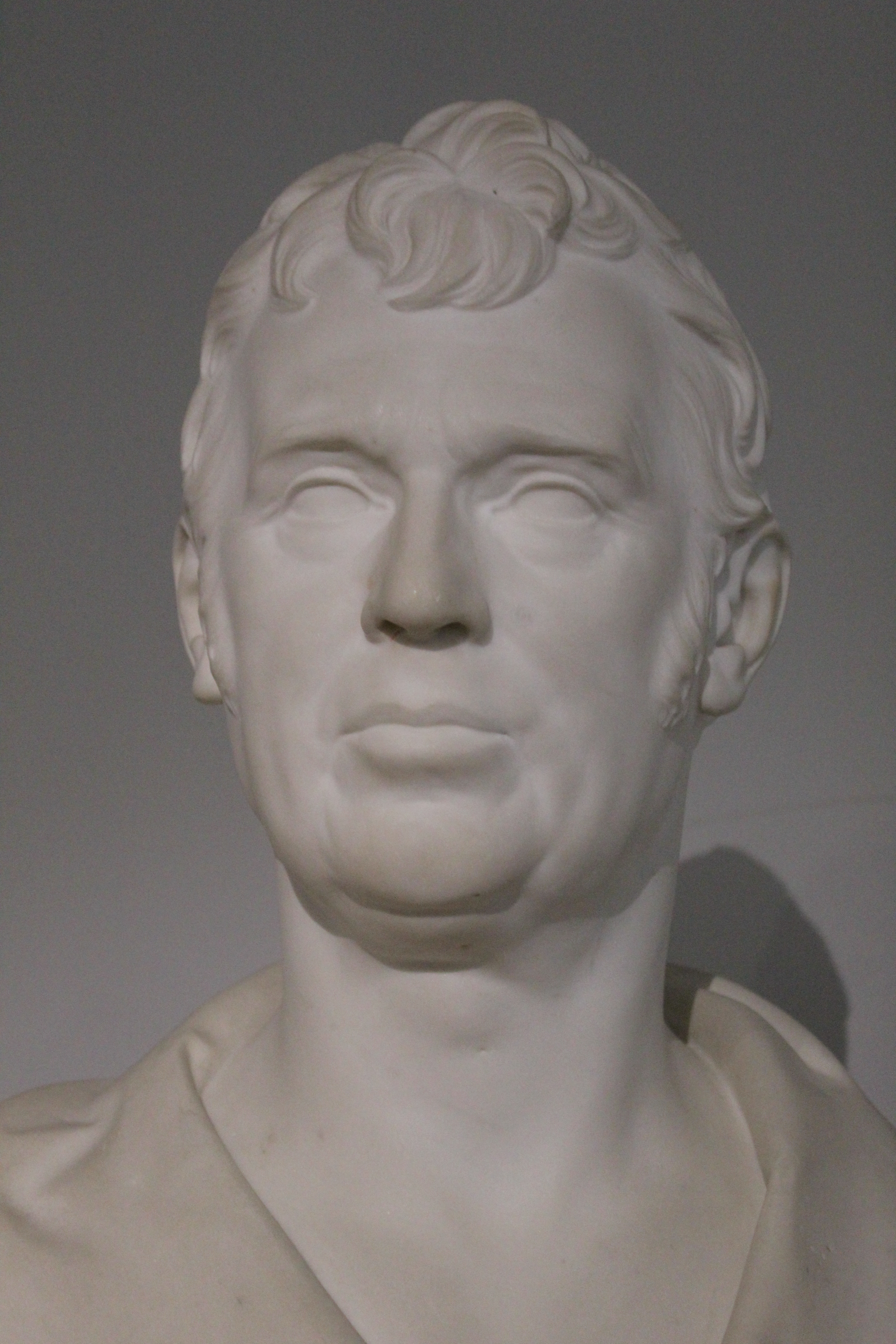
- Rivers by Thomas Milnes, 1857, National Maritime Museum
- Born: 1788
- Died: 5 December 1856 (aged 67–68)
- Occupation: Royal Navy lieutenant

William Rivers (1788 – 5 December 1856) was a British Royal Navy lieutenant and adjutant of Greenwich Hospital. He lost his left leg in the Battle of Trafalgar.

== Biography ==
Rivers was entered on board the Victory in May 1795. In her he went out to the Mediterranean, was slightly wounded in the action of 13 July 1795, was present in the Battle of Cape St. Vincent, 14 February 1797, and on the return of the Victory to England continued in her while she was employed as a depot for prisoners, till paid off in 1799. He again joined the Victory in 1803, when she went out to the Mediterranean as flagship of Lord Nelson, and, continuing in her, was present in the Battle of Trafalgar, 21 October 1805, when he was severely wounded by a splinter in the mouth, and had his left leg shot off in the very beginning of the action. On 8 January 1806 he was promoted to be lieutenant of the Princess of Orange. He received a gratuity from the patriotic fund, and in 1816 was awarded a pension of five shillings a day for the loss of his leg. From April 1806 to January 1807 he served in the Otter sloop in the Channel, from April 1807 to October 1809 he was in the Cossack frigate, in which he was present at the reduction of Copenhagen in September 1807, and in the end of 1809 was in the Cretan off Flushing. For the following years, and till the peace, he served in successive guardships at the Nore. After many fruitless applications for employment, he was in November 1824 appointed warden at Woolwich dockyard, and in April 1826 to Greenwich Hospital. Here he remained for upwards of thirty years, during which time he took an active part in the administration and organisation of the hospital and many of the minor charities connected with it. He died in his rooms in the hospital on 5 December 1856. He married, in 1809, a niece of Joseph Gibson of Long Bennington, Lincolnshire, and had children. A subscription bust by Thomas Milnes is in the Painted Hall at Greenwich.
