= Finnie =

Finnie may refer to:

- Finnie (surname), a surname of Scottish origin which means "sincere"
- Finnie, Queensland, a rural locality in Australia
- Finnie (mascot), the mascot of the 2026 Commonwealth Games

== See also ==
- Finney (disambiguation)
