= Glasgow art =

== Glasgow’s art history ==
Glasgow has one of the most extensive collections of art in the world, spread out across 13 museums throughout the city.

In 1999, Glasgow was voted the UK city of Architecture and Design. The heritage from the Victorian era includes ‘The Herald Building’ on Mitchell Street and ‘The St Enoch Subway’ Station centred in the heart of Glasgow’s city centre. Glasgow’s pride in its achievements is shown in exhibitions within the Kelvin Grove Art Gallery.

== Glasgow’s artists ==
Charles Rennie Mackintosh was an architect and artist from Glasgow. Mackintosh attended Glasgow School of Art in the late 1880s. Mackintosh was heavily influenced by the Industrial Revolution. Mackintosh worked on notable architectural projects such as the House for an Art Lover and the Glasgow School of Art.

== Kelvingrove Art Gallery and Museum ==
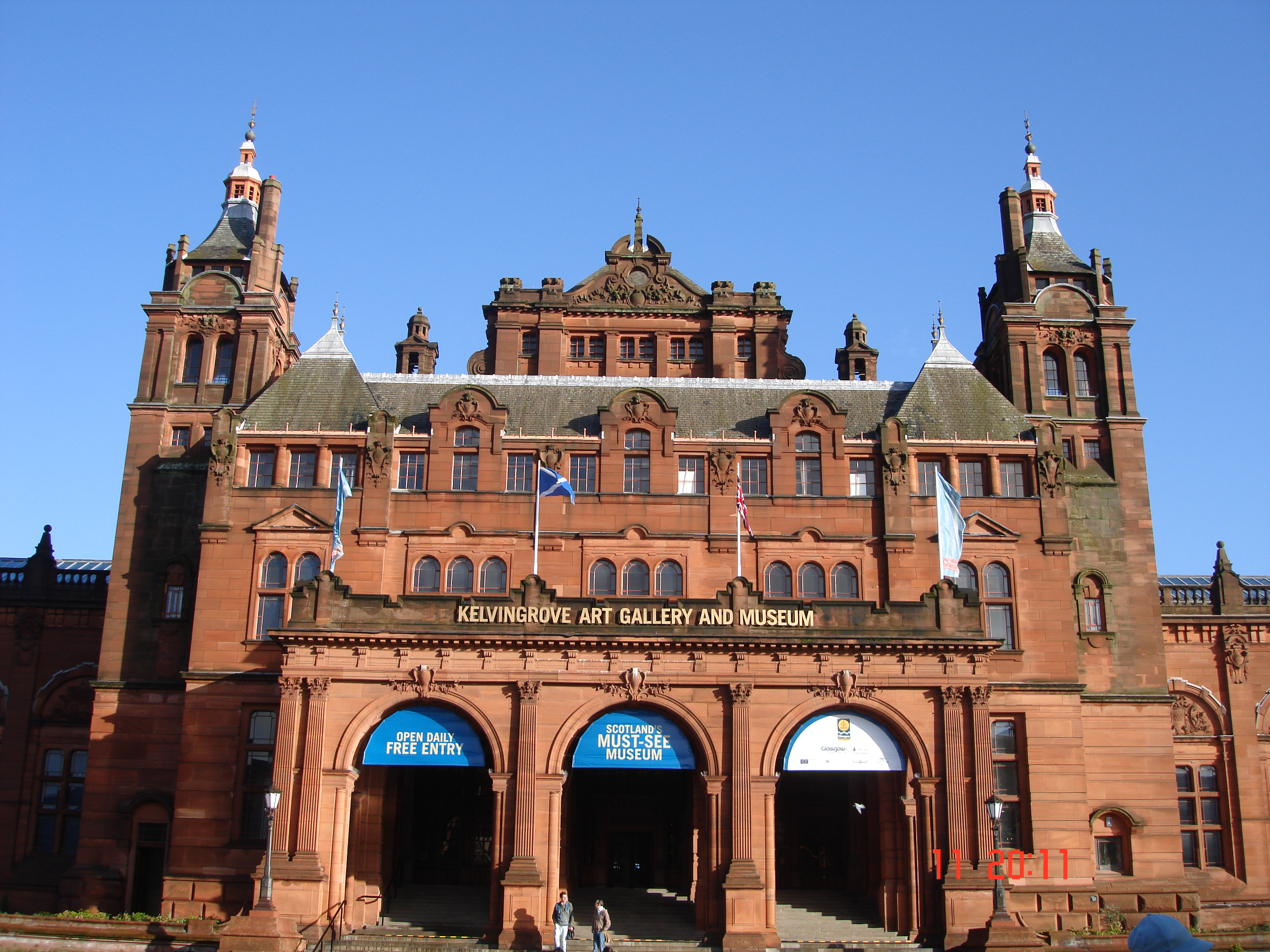
Main Entrance to Kelvingrove Galleries

The Kelvingrove Art Gallery and Museum consists of three floors:

The Lower Ground Floor is the main public entrance to the gallery. It contains a small RBS Gallery and a café. The extended part of the lower ground floor is known as the Campbell Hunter Foundation Education Wing.

The Ground Floor has a mini museum for under 5s, which leads into the two separate sides of the museum – Life and Expression. This leads to hands-on displays in the Environment Discovery Centre and The Art Discovery Centre. Other galleries present on this floor are Looking at Design, Mackintosh and the Glasgow Style, Scotland’s Wildlife, Ancient Egypt, Glasgow Stories, Looking at Art, Creatures of the Past and Scottish Art.

On the First Floor subjects include Conflict & Consequence, Cultural Survival, Dutch Art, Italian Art, French Art, La Faruk Madonna, Every Picture Tells a Story, Scottish Identity in Art, Glasgow and the World, Scotland’s First People, Sculpture Highlights and Picture Promenade. The level has a multimedia Object Cinema, the History Discovery Centre, and the Study Centre.

The Glasgow museums carry out projects from conservation and restoration of individual objects, through to complete refurbishment and new-build of museums. These museums are also linked to the Open Museum. The Open Museum takes Glasgow Museums' collections beyond the museum walls and out into the community. The Open Museum has reminiscence kits, object handling kits and exhibitions available for loan. This free service allows Glasgow's citizens to borrow museum objects and create their own displays. recently received an extra £30 Million in funding which they used to extensively refurbish the museum. Since the renovations the museum has put 50% more exhibits on show.

== Glasgow Gallery of Modern Art ==
Based in the heart of Glasgow City Centre, the Glasgow Gallery of Modern art is a neo-classical building offering temporary exhibitions, featuring work by local, national and international artists. The building was built as a townhouse for a tobacco trader. The gallery opened in 1996 after renovation work carried out partly by Glasgow City Council, the renovations included building a café and an interactive zone in the basement. The international works on display include paintings, sculptures, prints, photography and videos.

In the basement of the gallery there is a Library, café, free internet access terminals and book-lending services. GoMA offers a year-round programme of events, including artist talks, and the Saturday Art Club for families. The rooftop café has changed into a dedicated Education and Access studio, facilitating workshops for all ages. Work from these workshops is displayed in the Balcony Gallery, which also houses collaborative work between artists and communities. The gallery is the second most visited gallery in the UK after the Tate Modern Gallery in London

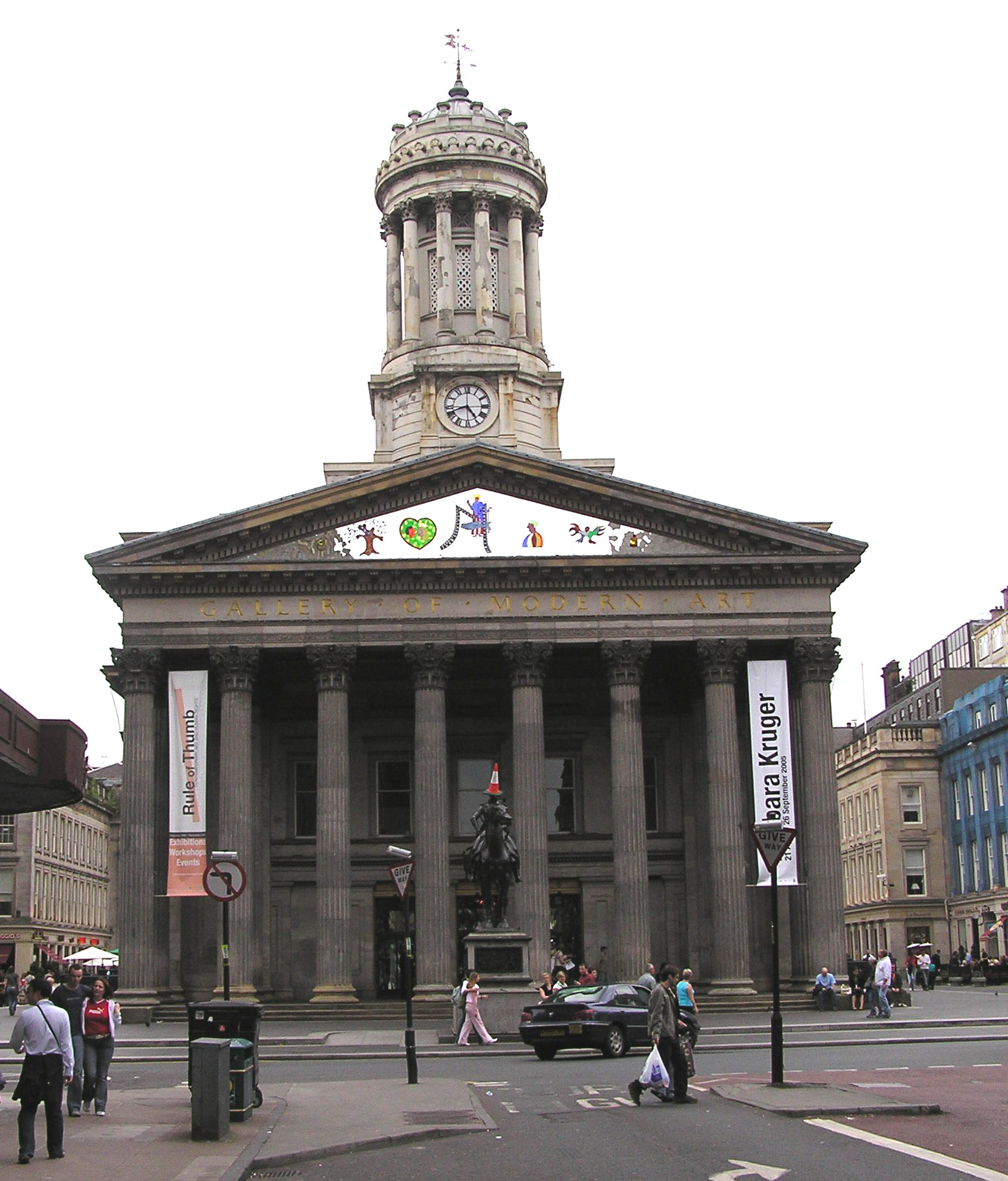
Outside the Gallery of Modern Art

== See also ==
- Gallery of Modern Art
- Hunterian Museum and Art Gallery
- Culture in Glasgow
