= Perry (mascot) =

Mascot of the 2022 Commonwealth Games

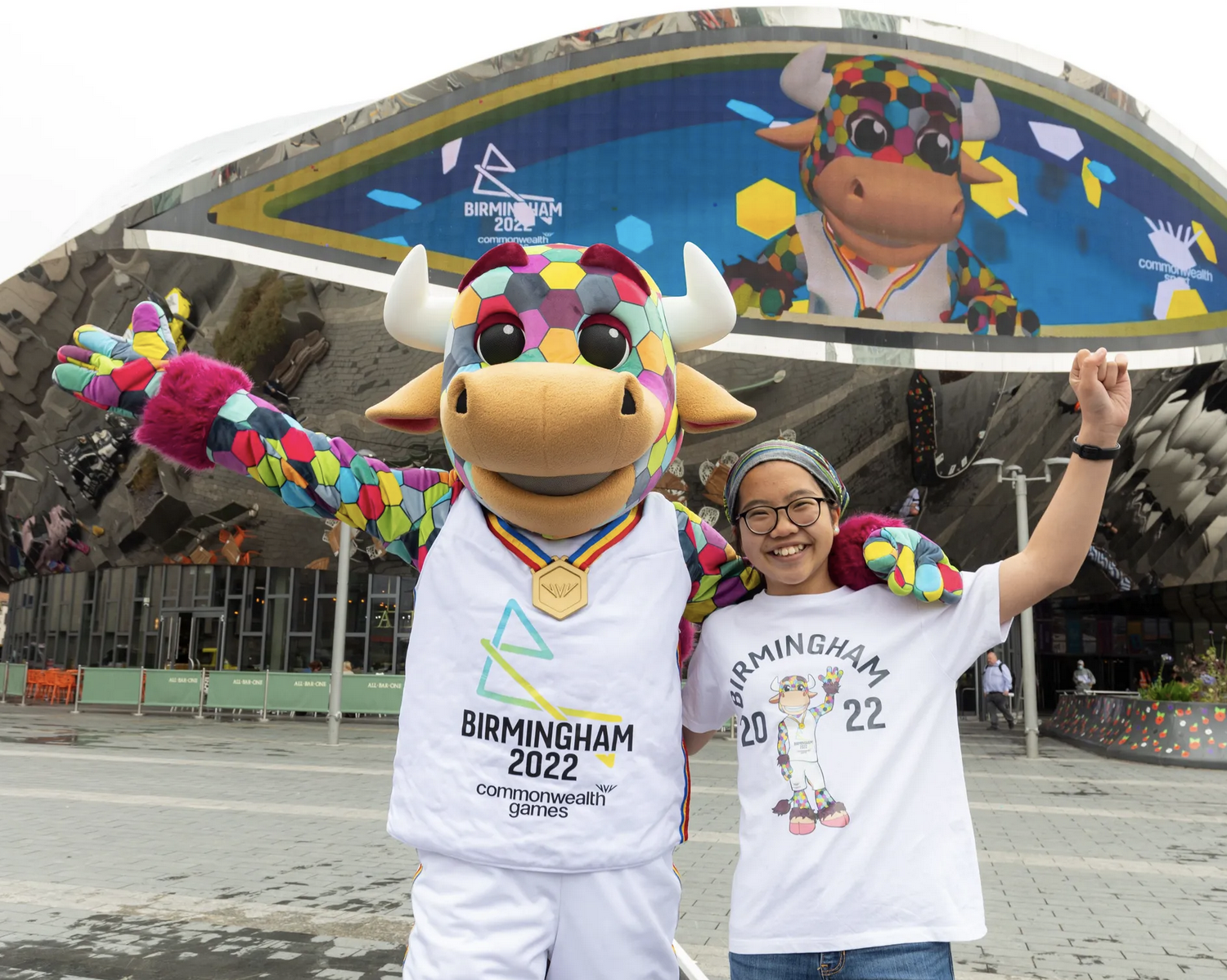
- Perry the Bull and his creator Emma Lou
- Created by: Emma Lou

In-universe information
- Species: Bull
- Gender: Male
- Nationality: English

Perry was the official mascot of the 2022 Commonwealth Games in Birmingham, England. The organisers named him Perry after Perry Barr, the area of Birmingham where the games' primary venue, Alexander Stadium is located. He is a bull in reference to Birmingham's historic Bull Ring market. Perry's sports kit relates to the sports of the Commonwealth Games and his medal is meant to symbolise Birmingham's Jewellery Quarter. His skin is emblazoned with multicoloured hexagons, to represent equality, diversity and the strength of the Commonwealth family.

The design was inspired by Emma Lou, a ten-year-old girl who won a national competition in 2020. Emma was also the first person to see Perry in full mascot costume. The competition was launched by a former Olympic athlete and gold medal winner, Denise Lewis. Emma received lavish praise for creating "the perfect Games mascot for celebrations across the city, the country and the Commonwealth".

The costumed version of the mascot was engaged in outreach in the run-up to the games, such as on a visit to Wilson Stuart School in Perry Common, House of Commons and a visit to 10 Downing Street where he was accused of photobombing a Sky News report on the day of a confidence vote in Conservative leader Boris Johnson. A plushie version of Perry accompanied the Queen's Baton on its 2021–22 relay around the Commonwealth. Perry's Trail, a city-wide trail of 17 Perry statues and eight digital avatars, was launched a week before the opening ceremony to celebrate the games.

== See also ==
- List of Commonwealth Games mascots
