= Statue of the Duke of Wellington, Woolwich =

Statue in London, England

Coordinates: 51.4936°N 0.0739°E

Statue of the Duke of Wellington
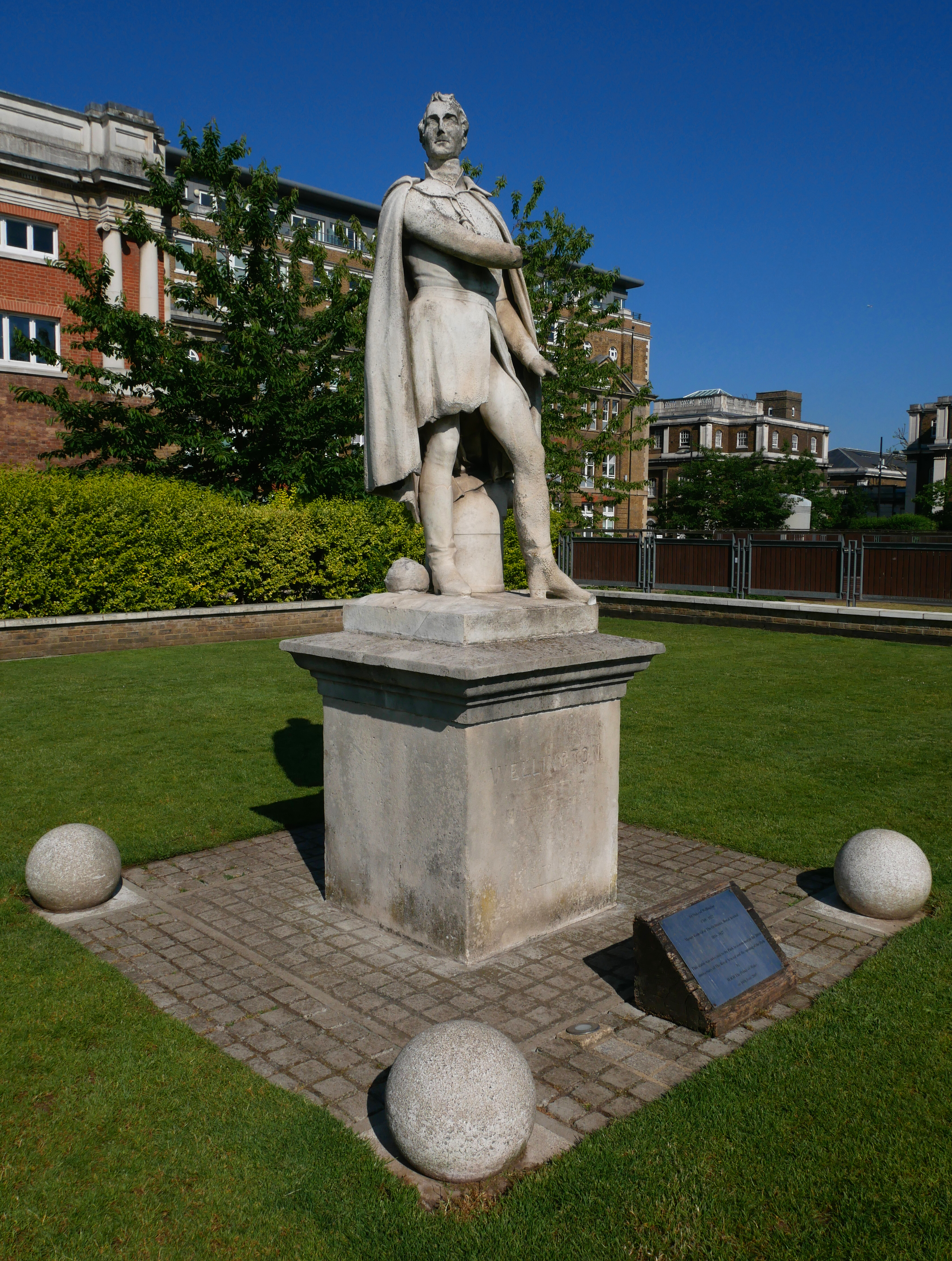
- Artist: Thomas Milnes
- Completion date: 1848
- Subject: Arthur Wellesley, 1st Duke of Wellington
- Location: London

Listed Building – Grade II
- Official name: Royal Arsenal Statue of the Duke of Wellington
- Designated: 9 July 1997
- Reference no.: 1211108

The statue of the Duke of Wellington is a statue in Portland stone at the centre of the eponymous Wellington Park in the former Royal Arsenal in Woolwich, London. It is Grade II listed as of July 1997.

The Duke of Wellington, considered as one of the two defenders of Britain during the Napoleonic Wars, is depicted in a number of memorials throughout the nation in general and London in particular.

The statue that now stands in Woolwich was originally placed in the Tower of London, recognising the Duke's ceremonial post as Constable of the Tower. It was moved to Woolwich in 1863, where it now represents his post of Master-General of the Ordnance. It was moved to its current site in 1974 and was ceremoniously unveiled by the Prince of Wales, the future Charles III, in 2005 to mark the 200th anniversary of the Royal Arsenal.
