= Finnie (mascot) =

2026 Commonwealth Games mascot

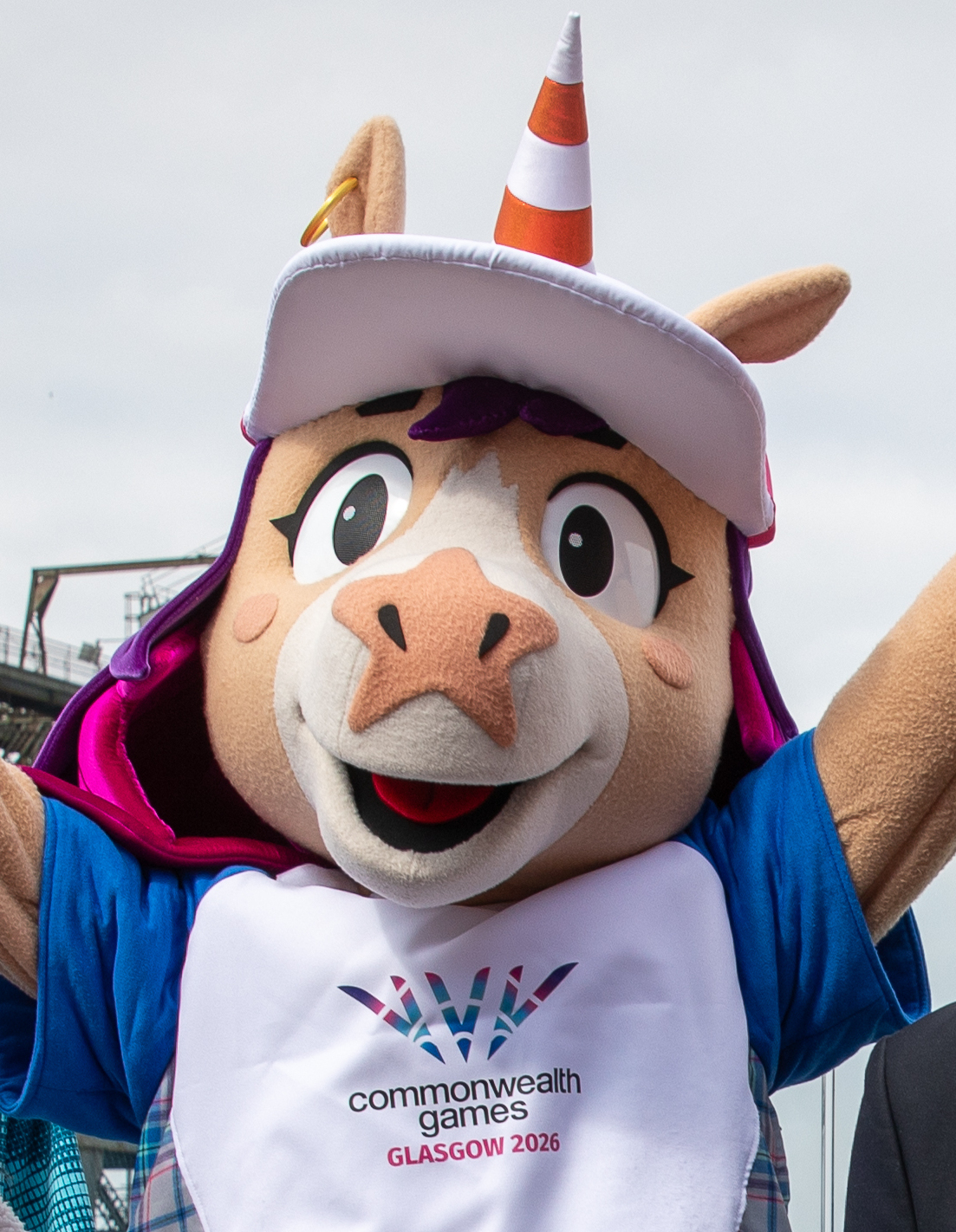
- Finnie in July 2025
- Created by: The Mascot Makers

In-universe information
- Species: Unicorn
- Gender: Female
- Nationality: Scottish

Finnie is the official mascot of the 2026 Commonwealth Games in Glasgow, Scotland. She is a unicorn, the national animal of Scotland, with a traffic cone for a horn. She replaces Clyde, the mascot of the 2014 Commonwealth Games that were also held in Glasgow.

Finnie was designed with the input of 76 children from 24 schools in Glasgow. The group of children were dubbed the "Mascot Makers". She is named after the Finnieston Crane, a disused crane in the middle of Glasgow. Her traffic cone horn is a reference to a local tradition of putting a traffic cone on the head of the Duke of Wellington statue outside of the Gallery of Modern Art. Other design elements include a silver flash on her shoes in reference to Glasgow's shipbuilding industry, stars in reference to the Barrowland Ballroom and a purple mane in reference to the Hydro venue. She wears a tartan design featuring a grey base with blue, pink, and purple threads. She also wears an earring inspired by the coat of arms of Glasgow and a friendship bracelet made by the Mascot Makers.

In early July 2025, the organising committee for the 2026 Games released an announcement in which the 2014 mascot Clyde stated that he would not be "running" to be the mascot again in 2026. On 23 July 2025, Finnie was officially unveiled at the top of the Finnieston Crane, making her debut exactly 365 days away from the opening of the 2026 Games. On that same day, John Swinney, the first minister of Scotland, attended a photoshoot with Finnie and the Mascot Makers.

At the 2026 Commonwealth Games opening ceremony, Finnie met with Charles III and Queen Camilla.

== See also ==
- List of Commonwealth Games mascots
