= Waterloo Memorial (disambiguation) =

Waterloo Memorial may refer to:

- Waterloo Memorial, or Wellington's Column, in Liverpool, England
- Waterloo Memorial Arena, in Waterloo, Ontario, Canada
- Waterloo Memorial Recreation Complex, in Waterloo, Ontario, Canada

== See also ==
- List of monuments to Arthur Wellesley, 1st Duke of Wellington
- Waterloo-Tor, in Osnabrück, Germany
- Waterloo Monument, near Ancrum in the Scottish Borders
