= Omission of Tasmania from maps of Australia =

Cartographical error

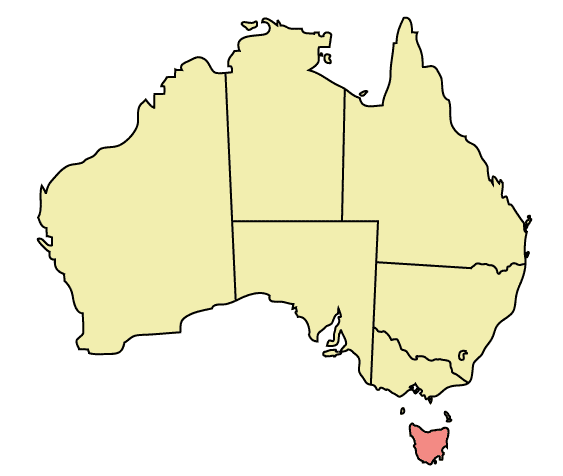
Map of Australia with Tasmania highlighted in red.

The Australian island state of Tasmania is sometimes omitted from maps of Australia. Such omissions are sometimes corrected after complaints from Tasmanians.

== Early omissions ==
In 1909, the Daily Post of Hobart reported that "very often maps of the Commonwealth ... are not graced with the fair island of Tasmania depicted on them."

== 1982 Commonwealth Games ==
During the 1982 Commonwealth Games opening ceremony, performers created a map of Australia that omitted Tasmania. English-born Australian poet Andrew Sant wrote "Off the Map" in response:

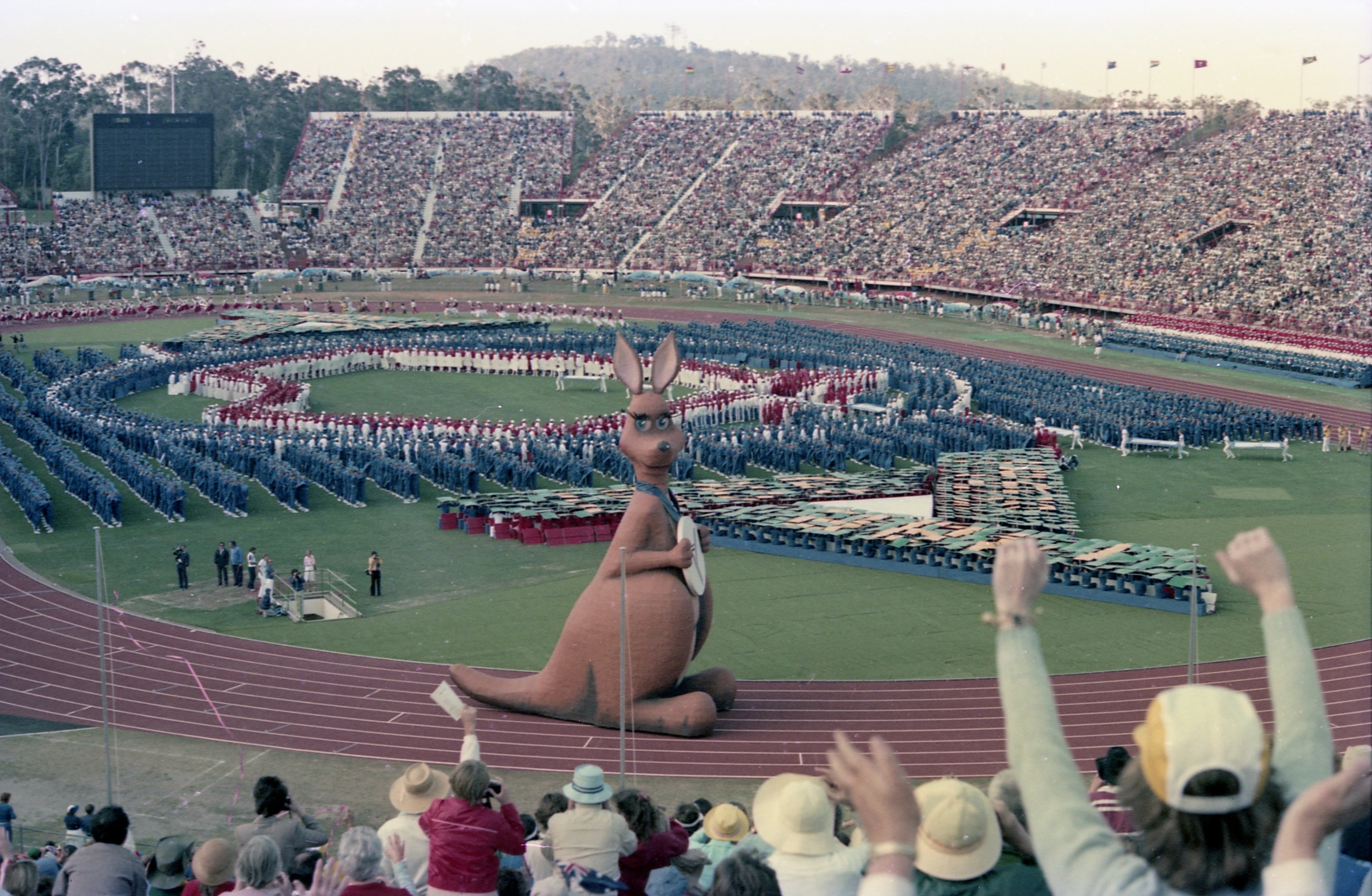
Performers making a map of Australia (excluding Tasmania) during the 1982 Commonwealth Games opening ceremony.

Identity deleted,
Close to the Continent
Who wouldn't make a fuss?
There have been wars for less ...

== 2014 Commonwealth Games ==
The Australian swim team at the 2014 Commonwealth Games were issued training swimsuits with a stylised design featuring maps of Australia, along with kangaroos and emus. The animals obscured Tasmania, and the design was criticized for leaving Tasmania off the map. Tasmanian Premier Will Hodgman called the omission "un-Australian and unforgivable".

== Other incidents ==
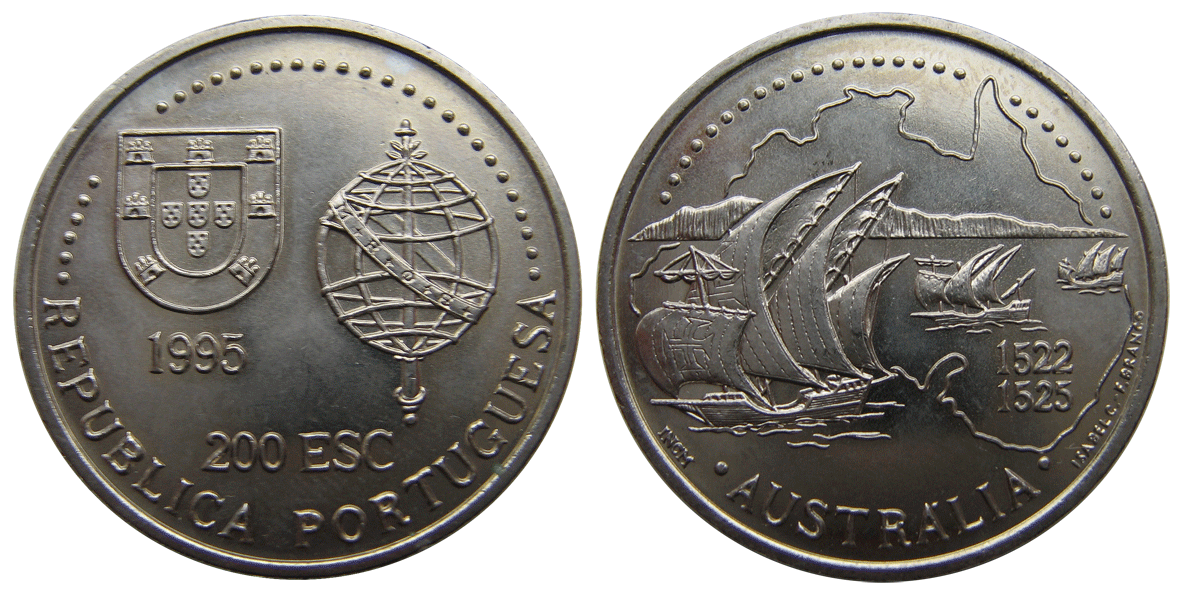
In 1995, Portugal issued a 200 escudo coin commemorating Portugal's discovery of Australia, but the map used did not include Tasmania.

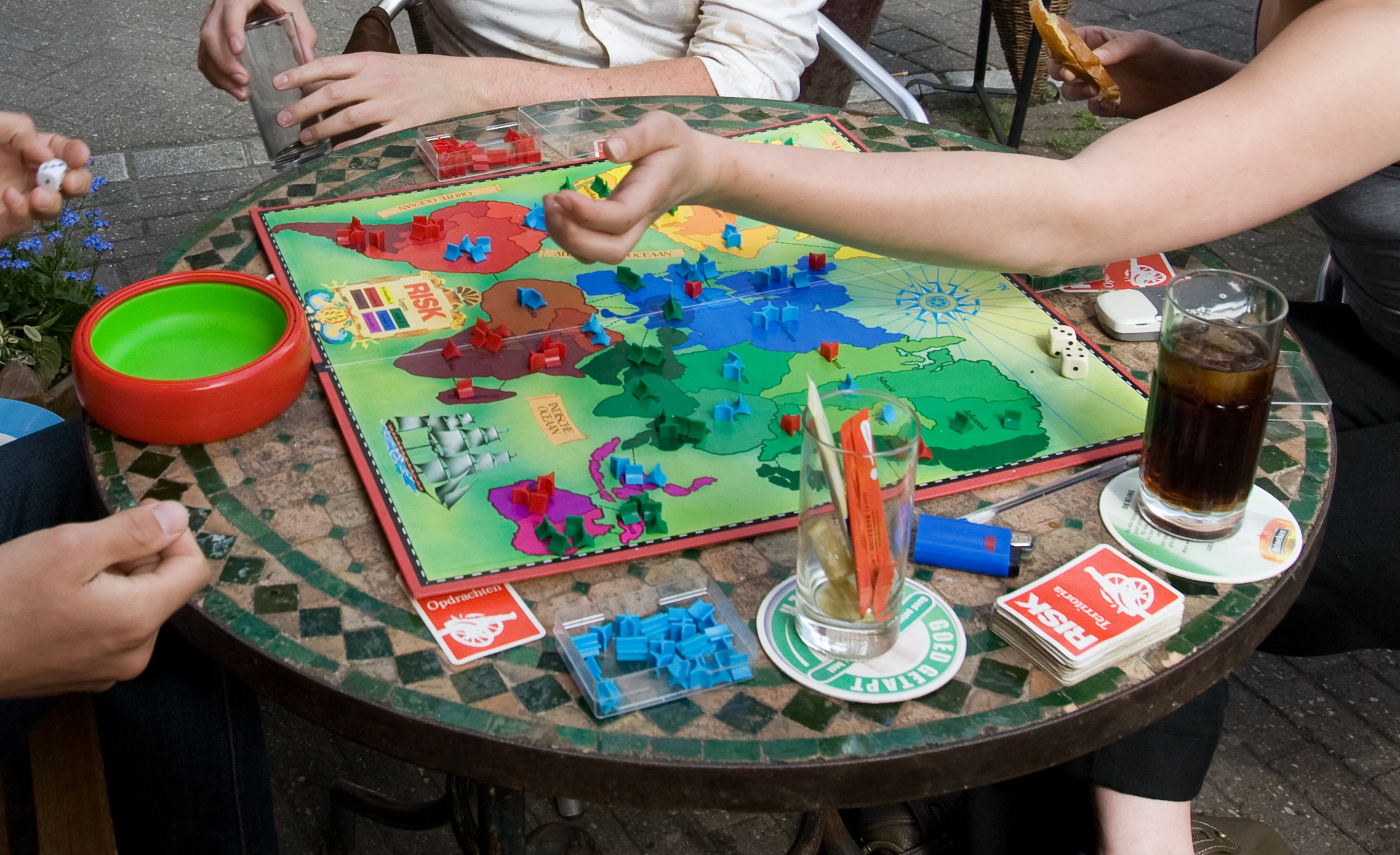
Many editions of the map in the board game Risk include Australia without Tasmania

- Australian athletes at the 1956 Summer Olympics, held in Melbourne, wore tracksuits that featured a map of Australia excluding Tasmania.
- The 1993 racing game Top Gear 2 omitted Tasmania from its Australasia's "country selection" screen map.
- In 2000, the island was left off the Australian map in some of the official literature for the Sydney Olympics.
- Tasmania was omitted from the map of Australia shown on some promotional posters of the 2008 film Australia.
- In 2012, Arnott's Biscuits produced a biscuit in the shape of mainland Australia.
- In 2013, South Australia adopted a logo that omitted Tasmania.
- In 2016, Woolworths were forced to withdraw Australia Day caps from sale which featured a map of Australia without Tasmania.
- In 2019, Thins Crisps released a Pie & Sauce flavour crisps which had a map of Australia with Tasmania omitted on the package.
- Many editions of the board game Risk do not include Tasmania (or New Zealand).

== State of Invisibility exhibition 2022 ==
In October 2022, publicist Hamish Thompson held an exhibition called State of Invisibility, which highlighted the absence of Tasmania from national maps, souvenirs and federal memorabilia. This event was covered by local and national press throughout Australia.

== See also ==
- Omission of New Zealand from maps
