= Clyde (mascot) =

Mascot of the 2014 Commonwealth Games

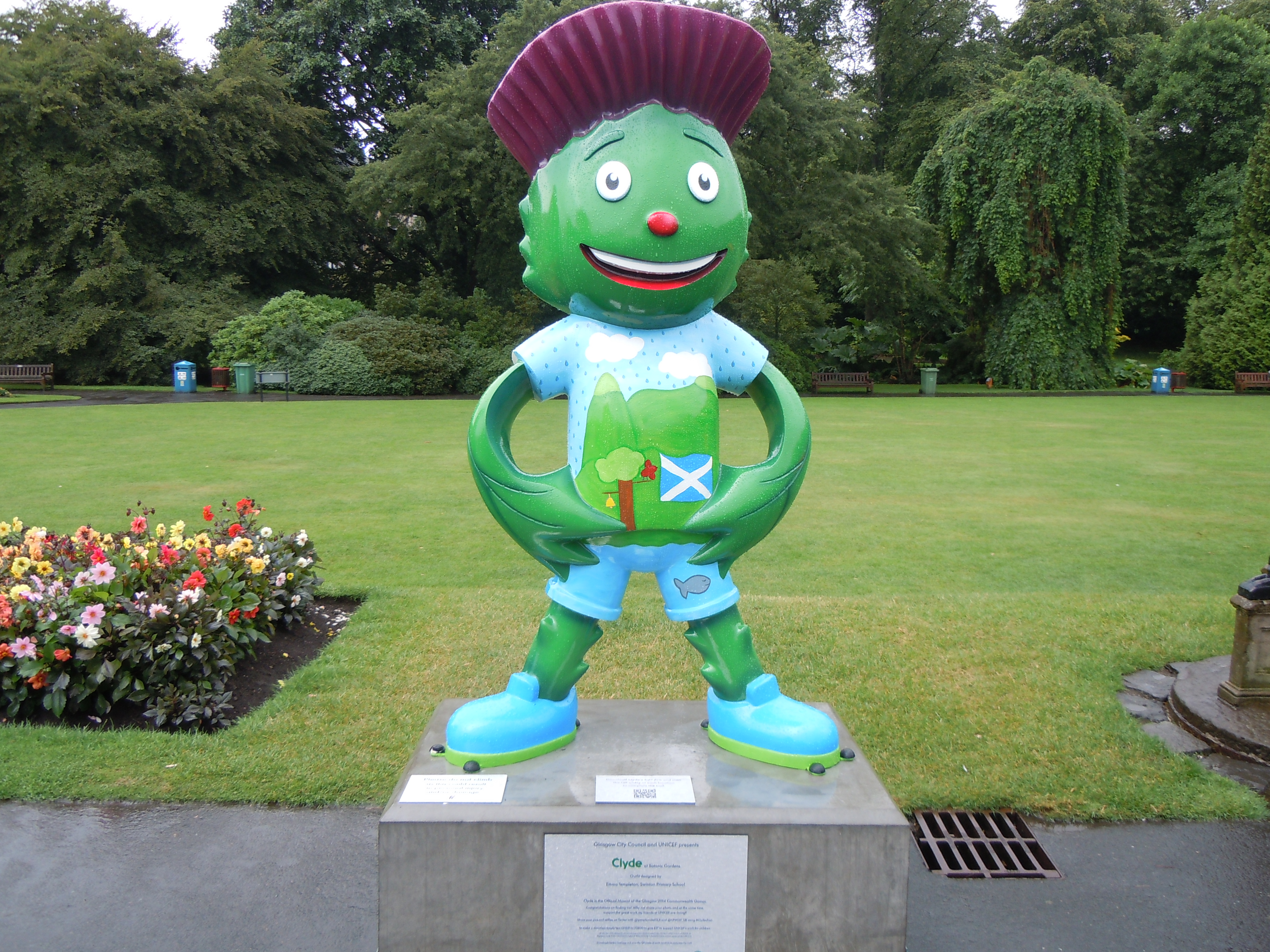
- A sculpture of Clyde at the Glasgow Botanic Gardens
- Created by: Beth Gilmour

In-universe information
- Species: Thistle
- Gender: Male
- Nationality: Scottish

Clyde was the official mascot of the 2014 Commonwealth Games in Glasgow. Clyde is an anthropomorphic thistle (the floral emblem of Scotland) and is named after the River Clyde which flows through the centre of Glasgow. The mascot was designed by Beth Gilmour from Cumbernauld, who won a competition run by Glasgow 2014 for children to design the Mascot. Beth's drawing was then brought to life by digital agency Nerv, who turned it into a commercial character, created a full backstory, gave it the name Clyde and created a website for him. Clyde was finally revealed in a seven-minute animated film created by Nerv at a ceremony at BBC Scotland's headquarters in Glasgow. The organiser, Glasgow 2014, said the mascot's design was chosen, because of its "Scottish symbolism and Glaswegian charm and likeability".

25 life-size Clyde statues were erected at places of public interest across the city including the Glasgow Botanic Gardens, the Kelvingrove Art Gallery and at George Square. However following vandalism at a statue in the Govan area of the city, the statues were taken down. By the final day of the Games, over 50,000 Clyde mascot cuddly toys had been sold.

Clyde was named as the official mascot for Team Scotland at the 2022 Commonwealth Games in Birmingham, England. In 2025, the organising committee for the 2026 Commonwealth Games in Glasgow released an announcement in which Clyde stated that he would not be "running" to be the mascot again in 2026. He was ultimately replaced by the unicorn mascot Finnie.

== See also ==
- List of Commonwealth Games mascots
- Finnie (mascot)
