= Royal Exchange Square =

Public square in Glasgow, Scotland

Coordinates: 55.8602°N 4.2526°W

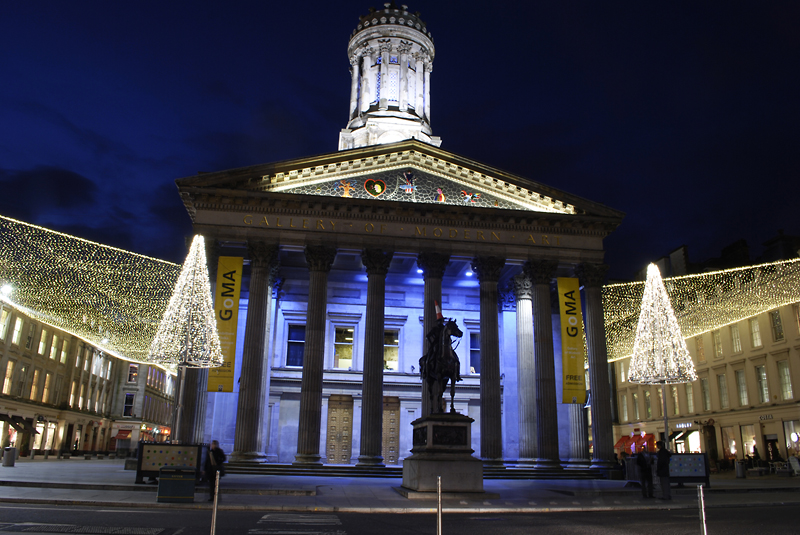
Evening view of Royal Exchange Square, Glasgow, in winter months

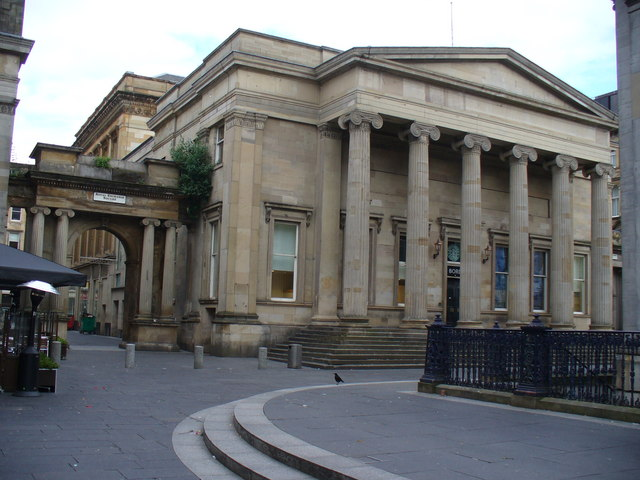
Royal Bank of Scotland building at the head of Royal Exchange Square, Glasgow

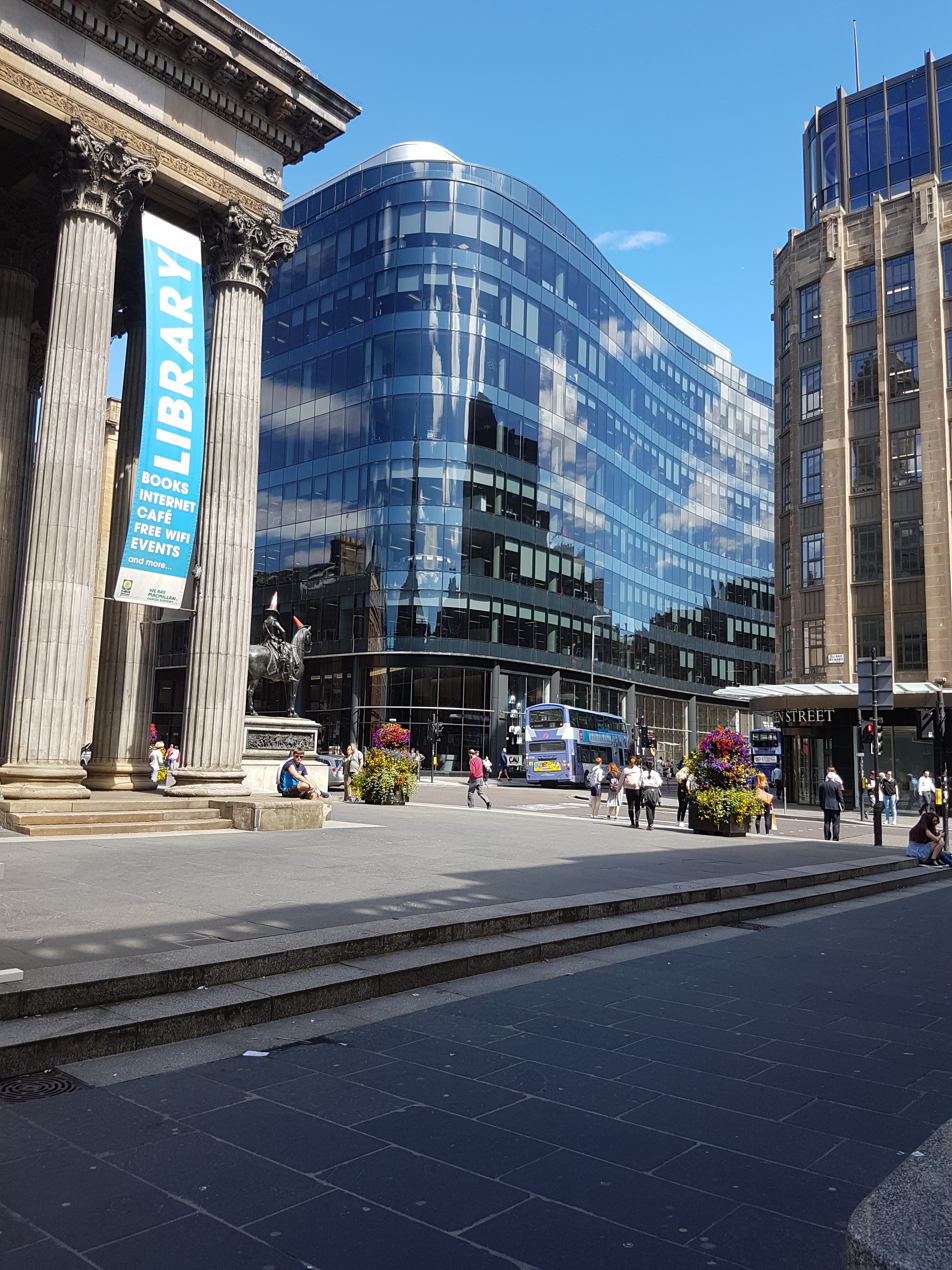
Royal Exchange Square, Glasgow viewing to Queen Street and Ingram Street

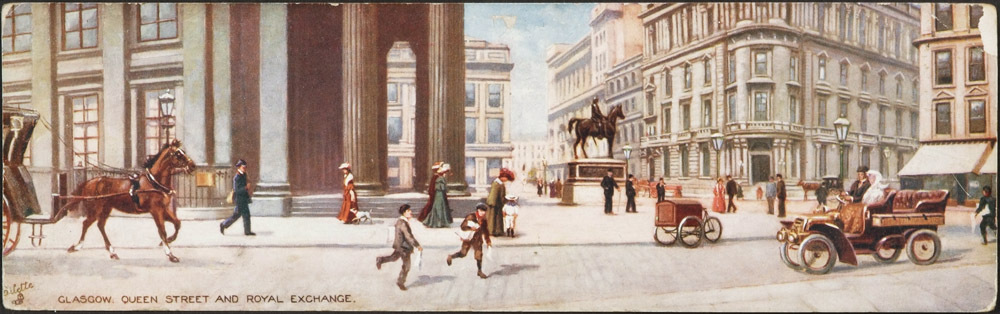
Panorama Card of the Royal Exchange, Glasgow in the 1890s

The Royal Exchange Square is a public square in Glasgow, Scotland. The square lies between Buchanan Street and Queen Street, opening out Queen Street and Ingram Street to the south of George Square. It is also easily accessible from Buchanan Street on the west side of the square, through two prominent archways at Royal Bank Place. The square is a landmark due to its distinguished architecture which attracts many visitors. It is one of six squares in the city centre.

== Historical background ==
Tobacco lord William Cunninghame's mansion and gardens fronting Queen Street, and central to the future square, were constructed in 1778 when the wealth of Glasgow soon eclipsed the remainder of Scotland.

Five years later the Royal Bank of Scotland opened in Glasgow, being its first ever branch beyond its Edinburgh base. Under David Dale, the bank in Glasgow soon surpassed the business volume of the Royal Bank elsewhere, and the bank bought Cunninghame's mansion in 1817 and operated from it. In 1827 the Royal Bank sold the Cunninghame mansion to the city for fitting out as an Exchange and its new Glasgow Chief Office branch, designed by Archibald Elliot II, complete with its six pillars and wide stairs, was erected in 1834 facing onto Royal Exchange Square. In 1850 this was extended through to Buchanan Street.

In the centre of the square is the former Royal Exchange, a Graeco-Roman building designed by architect David Hamilton in 1829, where merchants exchanged contracts in cotton, linen, chemicals, coal, iron, steel, timber and other commodities including stocks and shares in newly formed Limited Companies, prior to the Glasgow Stock Exchange being built in Buchanan Street. One hundred and twenty years later, the commercial and commodities markets found other ways of doing business in contrast to the daily gatherings and the Royal Exchange building was bought by Glasgow Corporation in 1949 to become Stirling's Library, named after the donor of the earlier library in Miller Street nearby.

In front of the vast portico is Carlo Marochetti's noble bronze equestrian statue of Duke of Wellington, erected in 1844. On the tall granite base are bronze reliefs of the battles of Assaye and Waterloo, the Return of the Soldier, and Peace and Agriculture. It usually features a traffic cone placed on its head. From the 1950s the Royal Exchange housed Stirling's Library and the Commercial Library, and now it houses the Gallery of Modern Art.

The architects of the Georgian terraces built around 1830 on the north side are David Hamilton and James Smith of Blythswood Square and on the south side are Robert Black and Archibald Elliot II. The classically designed former Chief Office of the Royal Bank of Scotland stands at the western end of the square.

There are shops and offices, and numerous open air cafés and restaurants. Home to Glasgow's only restaurant with a rooftop terrace, 29 Glasgow is a Members Club with a publicly accessible reataurant and function room. The square is also the home of the Western Club, whose restaurant is also open to the public.. In the winter, the square is usually lit up with a large overhead net of celestial lighting between the Gallery of Modern Art and surrounding buildings.

On the north side at the corner of Queen Street once stood the elegant Theatre Royal which opened in 1805.
