= Matilda (mascot) =

Mascot of the 1982 Commonwealth Games

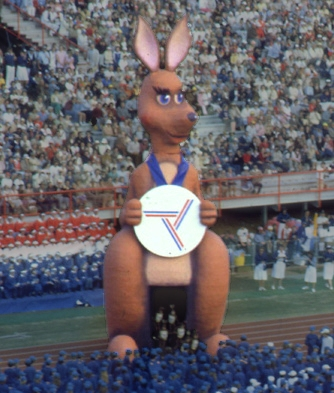
- Matilda during the 1982 Commonwealth Games opening ceremony

In-universe information
- Species: Kangaroo
- Gender: Female
- Nationality: Australian

Matilda was the mascot of the 1982 Commonwealth Games held in Brisbane, Australia.

Matilda was a sculpture of a kangaroo built on top of a forklift. Standing over 13 metres tall and weighing six tonnes, it could turn its head, its ears could wriggle, and eyes could wink and blink. Its pouch doubled as a door, which opened during the opening ceremony to let out 20 children, dressed as joeys, who ran out two by two for a trampoline display.

After the games, it ended up at the entrance to Wet'n'Wild Gold Coast in Oxenford. In 2008 it was sold to Puma Energy who re-erected it at the Matilda petrol station on the Gold Coast Highway in Tugun. However after the Gold Coast City Council deemed it breached its planning regulations, it was relocated to the Matilda fuel station on the Bruce Highway just south of Gympie at Kybong until the service station was demolished.

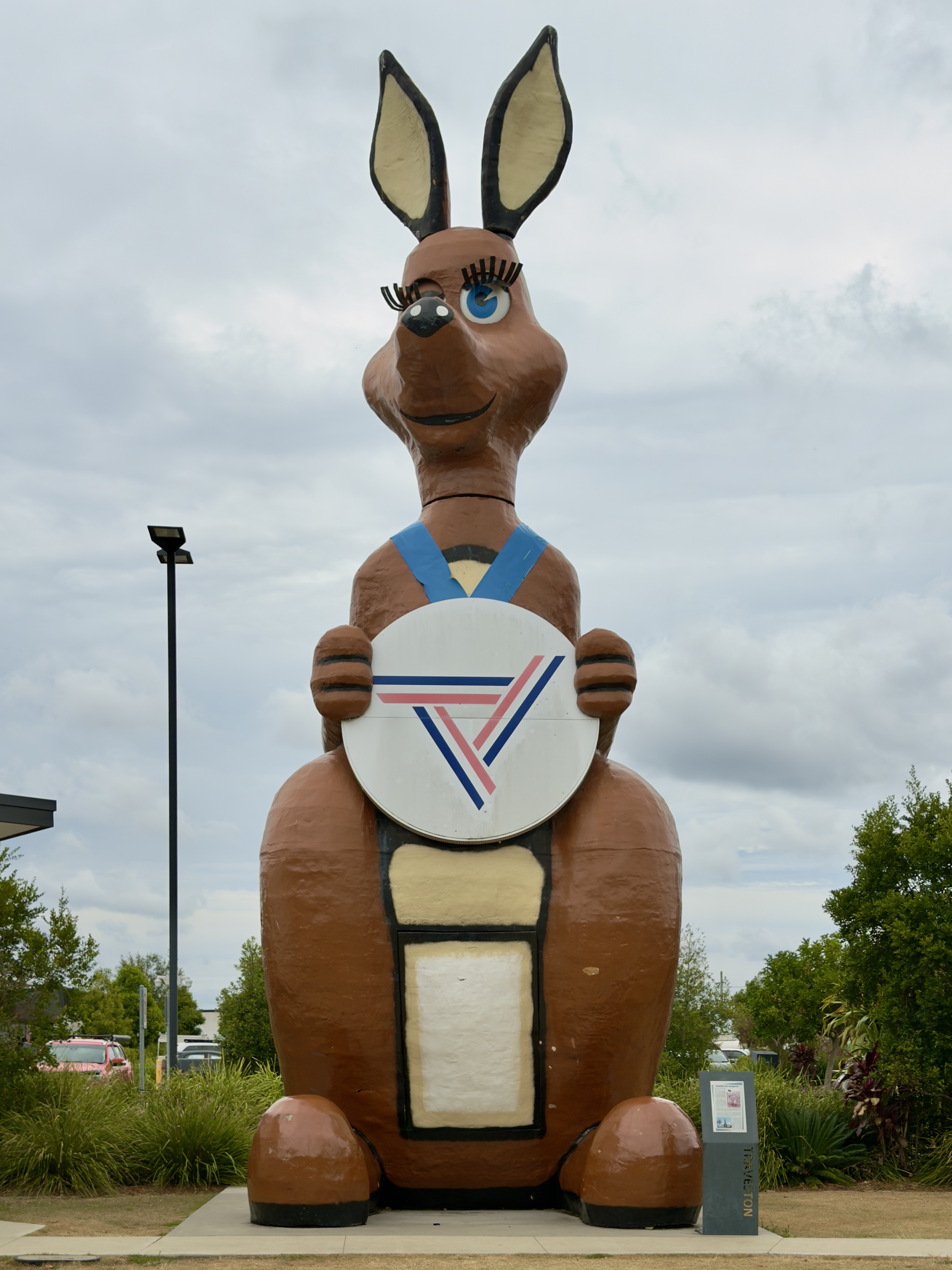
Matilda at the Traveston Service Centre, 2025

It is now located on the Bruce Highway at the Traveston Service Centre just 5.4 km south of the previous location at Kybong.

== See also ==
- List of Australian sporting mascots
- List of Commonwealth Games mascots
