= Omission of New Zealand from maps =

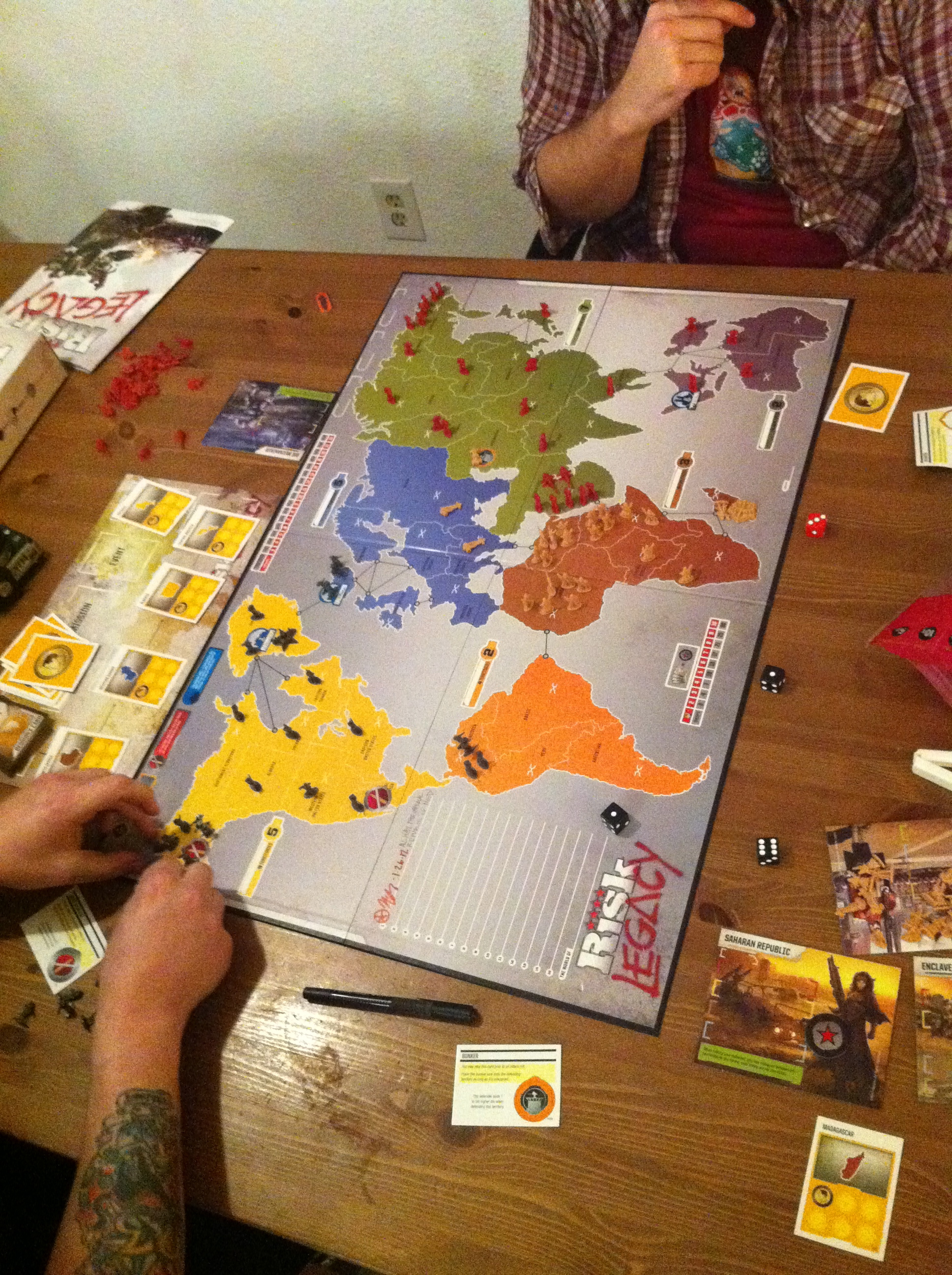
Map of the popular board game Risk (Legacy edition), which does not include New Zealand

New Zealand has often been omitted from maps of the world, which has caught the attention of New Zealanders. It is considered that this is because of the widespread use of the Mercator projection and the common mapping practice of putting Europe in the centre, which leaves New Zealand in the bottom right-hand corner of maps, sometimes making it go overlooked by mapmakers, easily removed by an accidental crop, or simply not added for convenience, ignorance or laziness.

New Zealand has been excluded from maps at the National Museum of Natural History in Washington, D.C., in the United States, in IKEA stores, on the map of the board games Pandemic and Risk, on the map of the 2014 Nuclear Security Summit in which Prime Minister of New Zealand John Key participated, at a world map seal at the United Nations Office at Geneva in Switzerland, on the newspaper Daily Mail, on Government Executive's newsletter Defense One, on the magazine Forbes, on the digital media platform Mashable, on the Pyongyang International Airport in North Korea and on the logo of the Flat Earth Society. It was also excluded from maps promoting the 2015 Rugby World Cup even though New Zealand was the world champion at the time. In 2016, a tourist from New Zealand was detained at Almaty International Airport by Kazakh immigration officers who believed hers was not an autonomous country, but a part of Australia; the officers' world map did not include New Zealand, so the tourist could not use it to convince them.

This recurrence has become a meme for New Zealanders. There is a community on Tumblr titled World Maps Without New Zealand and a Reddit community, or subreddit, known as r/MapsWithoutNZ both focused on this issue with 10,000 and 30,000 members respectively as of 2017. In 2019, a user in r/MapsWithoutNZ noticed that a map, "BJÖRKSTA world map", on sale for US$30 at an IKEA store in Washington, D.C., did not portray New Zealand. Subsequently, IKEA apologised and removed the product from its stores. On Reddit, there are also similar communities about the omission of Flevoland in the Netherlands, Hawaii in the United States, and Tasmania in Australia from maps.

The New Zealand Government acknowledged this phenomenon, featuring a map of the world in which the country was deliberately not included on the 404 error page of its official website; the page stated that "something's missing". Furthermore, in 2018, a tourism campaign video was published in which then Prime Minister Jacinda Ardern and the New Zealand actor and comedian Rhys Darby discussed why New Zealand was being left off world maps. In the video, Darby jokingly said that it was the result of a conspiracy against New Zealand. The video promoted the hashtag #getnzonthemap.

== See also ==
- Omission of Tasmania from maps of Australia
