= 1982 Commonwealth Games opening ceremony =

Opening ceremony

Coordinates: 27°33′30″S 153°3′44″E

The Opening Ceremony of the 1982 Commonwealth Games was held on 30 September 1982 at the QEII Stadium in Brisbane, Queensland, Australia.

The ceremony was directed by Ric Birch. The chairman for the XII Commonwealth Games was Sir Edward Williams, KBE, KCMG. Sir Edward was later decorated Australian of the Year for 1982.

== Description ==
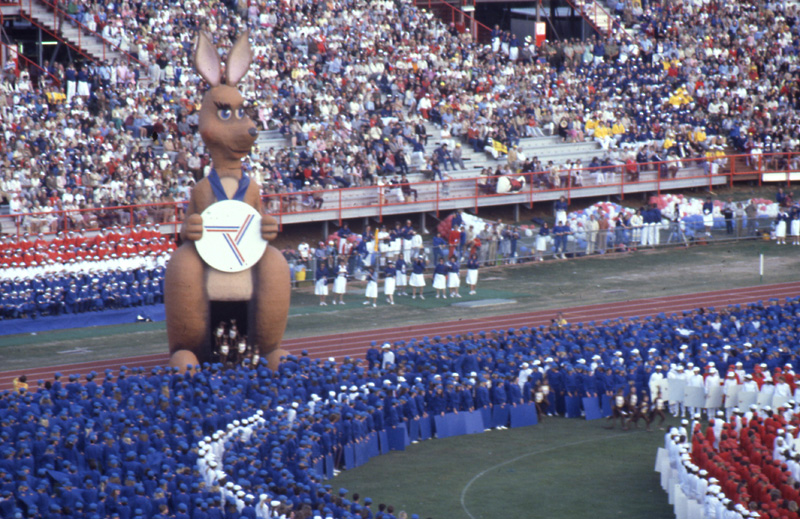
Matilda the mascot for the 1982 Commonwealth Games during the opening ceremony winking to the crowd

The opening ceremony was held during a fine and sunny, but extremely windy and somewhat cool, afternoon. The starting of the opening ceremony was signaled with a kookaburra's call, followed by the traditional cry of "cooeee". Already on the field were two Commonwealth Games logos. After the announcement welcoming the audience to the opening ceremony, thousands of high school students dressed in red, white, or blue came running onto the field. Some of the children carried fabric placards while others picked up coloured boards once they were on the field. While the Opening Prelude / Commonwealth Games Song was performed by the Queensland Symphony Orchestra and the Sydney Philharmonia Choir), the children formed the Australian flag.

As this was breaking up, marching girls, wearing white and blue, green and black, or red and white, came along the athletics track from the right. From the left, came Surf Lifesavers bearing a variety of flags. The following music was played:

- March Past (Queensland Symphony Orchestra and the Sydney Philharmonia Choir)
- Medley: instrumental music:

("The Drover's Dream" / "Brown Slouch Hat" /
"Click Go the Shears" / "The Overlanders")

- "I Still Call Australia Home"
- "Tie Me Kangaroo Down Sport" / "Along the Road to Gundagai"

The high school students then formed red and blue circles, outlined in white, surrounded by a blue square. Again, on either side they formed the Commonwealth Games logo. The circles broke up to form a stylised map of Australia again surrounded by a blue square representing the sea. The map was the source of controversy as it omitted Tasmania.

The centre of the map was now filled with young people in the native costumes of the many different nationalities which make up Australia. While "I Still Call Australia Home" was playing, these young people stood in rows, holding hands, and swaying to represent waves on the sea.

The dances within the map included an ethnic folk dance medley of some of the countries from which some Australian people came. The dances were;

- "Bomba" (Butterfly Dance), which was sung and performed by Arnhem Land Aborigines
- "Seri-Seri" (Sun Dance), which was sung and performed by The Torres Strait Islands Dance Group of Murray and Darnley
- "Ethnic Dance Medley" (an original medley of 15 dances) — a Yugoslav hora, Irish soft shoe reel, Italian tarantella, Polynesian tamure, German schuhplatter, Spanish sevillanas, Filipino tinikling, Scottish country dance and Highland reel o'tulloch, Latin American los andinos, Sri Lankan harvest dance, Polish polka, Greek pergousiko, Hungarian czardas and a Ukrainian gopak

As the dancers ran out of the stadium Matilda the games' mascot entered and performed a lap of honour. Matilda was represented in both the opening and closing ceremonies of the Games by a "winking" Matilda — a gigantic-size 13-metre (42 feet 8 inches) high mechanical kangaroo built around a forklift truck. As she travelled around the athletics track, she winked several times at the crowd, including a personal wink at the Duke of Edinburgh who was representing the Crown at the ceremony.

Once her lap was completed, her pouch opened and children representing joey kangaroos ran out towards small trampolines which had been set up in the centre of the stadium. As they bounced, Rolf Harris, standing on the tray of a small truck wearing a sky blue leisure suit and with his trademark wobble board, performed a special version of "Tie Me Kangaroo Down" which included the added lyrics:

Let me welcome you to the Games, friends,
Welcome you to the Games
Look, I don't know all of your names, friends,
But let me welcome you to the Games,

As the trampolines were moved out, Rolf Harris sang a slow-paced version of the song "Waltzing Matilda". Many of the crowd joined in during the chorus of the song. The children, meanwhile, had formed the Commonwealth Games logo in the centre of a blue circle. When the song finished, 50,000 red, white, and blue balloons were released. This was touted by Geraldine Doogue who was co-presenting the ABC's coverage of the event, as "the largest balloon display ever". Geraldine added that it had taken "120 people ... five hours and 100 cylinders of helium and balloon gas to blow 'em up." The school children then left the field.

At approximately 3:35 pm, the Parade of Nations, which was estimated to run for 45 minutes, commenced, led by the athletes from Canada, which had hosted the previous games, with Australia's athletes coming in last. When the team from the Falkland Islands entered the stadium, they received an enormous cheer from the crowd because of the recently fought Falklands War.

The Commonwealth Games Ceremonial flag was brought into the stadium and raised. The Athlete's Oath was taken by Tracey Wickham.

The final runner in the Queen's Baton Relay was Raelene Boyle, who handed the baton to the Duke of Edinburgh. The Duke read out the message which Elizabeth II had sent in the Queen's Baton, officially opening the Games (the Duke opened the Games because the Queen was unable to arrive in Australia in time to attend the opening ceremony).

Because the opening ceremony was held during daylight hours, there were no fireworks to accompany the ceremony. However, doves, as well as the colourful balloons of red, white and blue, were released. There were also supposed to be parachute jumpers, with parachutes of red, white and blue, taking part during the display at the opening ceremony, with the parachute jumpers landing within the stylised map of Australia within the stadium, but it was too risky, because of the extreme wind conditions, to have this segment as the strong wind might have blown the parachute jumpers off course if they had jumped (the parachute jumpers appeared during the closing ceremony, instead).

The Queen, who arrived in Brisbane during the Games, presented some of the medals, including presenting the gold medal to Australian swimmer Tracey Wickham. The Queen also closed the Games.

== Matilda legacy following the Games ==
The massive Matilda prop from the opening ceremony was relocated to Wet'n'Wild Water World, a water park in the Gold Coast hinterland. Matilda was dismantled for maintenance in 2007 but never reassembled. It was relocated and assembled at a Matilda fuel station at Kybong in 2011.

== See also ==
- Matilda (mascot)
- 2006 Commonwealth Games opening ceremony
- 2018 Commonwealth Games opening ceremony
