= Thomas Milnes (sculptor) =

English sculptor

- Born: c. 1810; Tickhill
- Died: 1888
- Occupation: Sculptor

Thomas Milnes (c. 1810–1888) was an English sculptor. He exhibited at the Royal Academy from 1842 to 1866. He also exhibited at the Great Exhibition of 1851 and the International Exhibition in 1862.

== Life and works ==
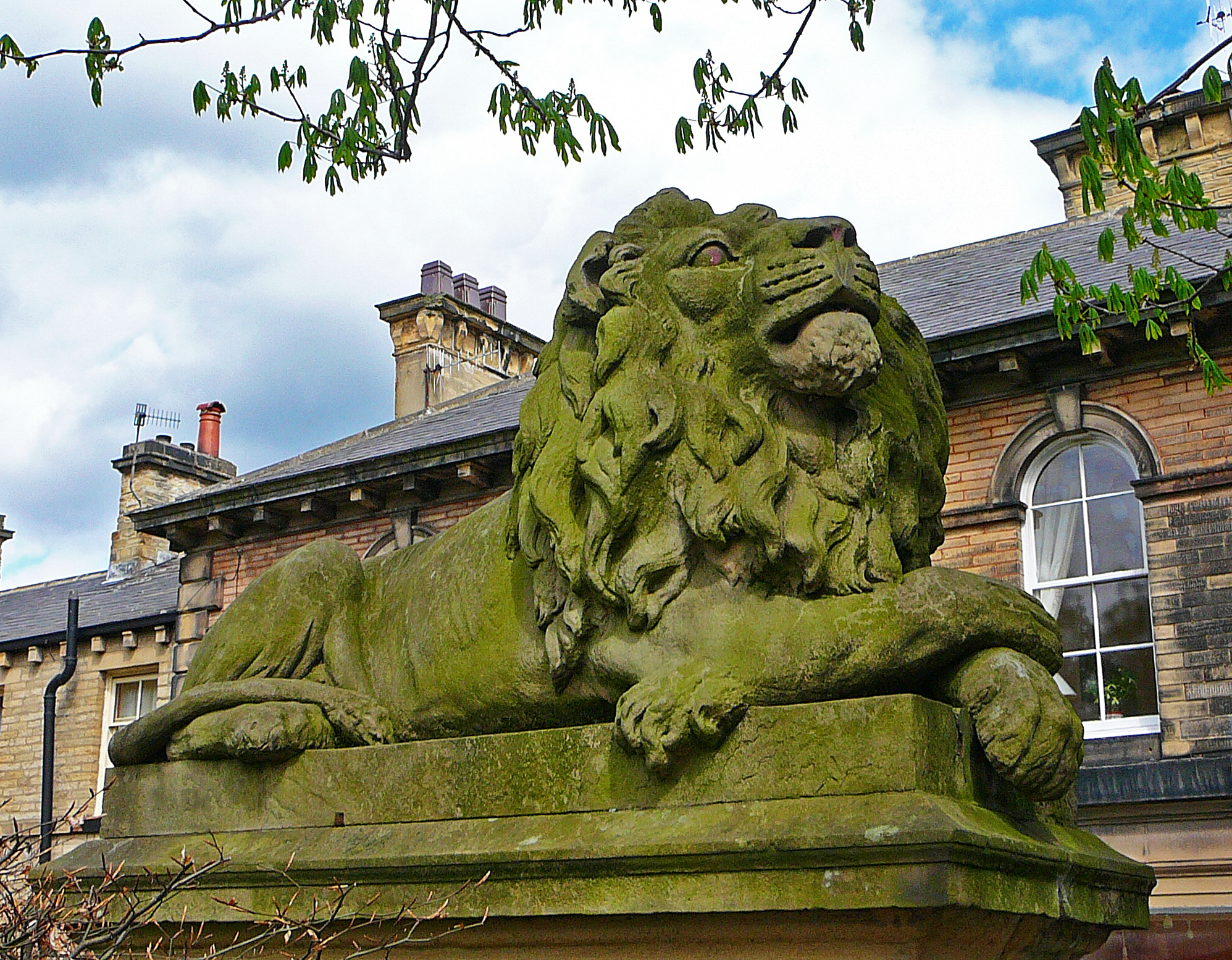
Lion "Vigilance" in Saltaire

Milnes was born in Tickhill (now in South Yorkshire). His father, a stonemason, and a cousin of Richard Monckton Milnes, 1st Baron Houghton, is said to have "dissipated his means" and neglected his son's education. Thomas went to London where he worked for a marble mason, and from 1841, recommended by Edward Hodges Baily, he attended the Royal Academy School.

He exhibited 26 pieces at the Royal Academy, mostly portrait busts, from 1842 to 1866. He exhibited at the Great Exhibition of 1851 and at the 1862 International Exhibition.

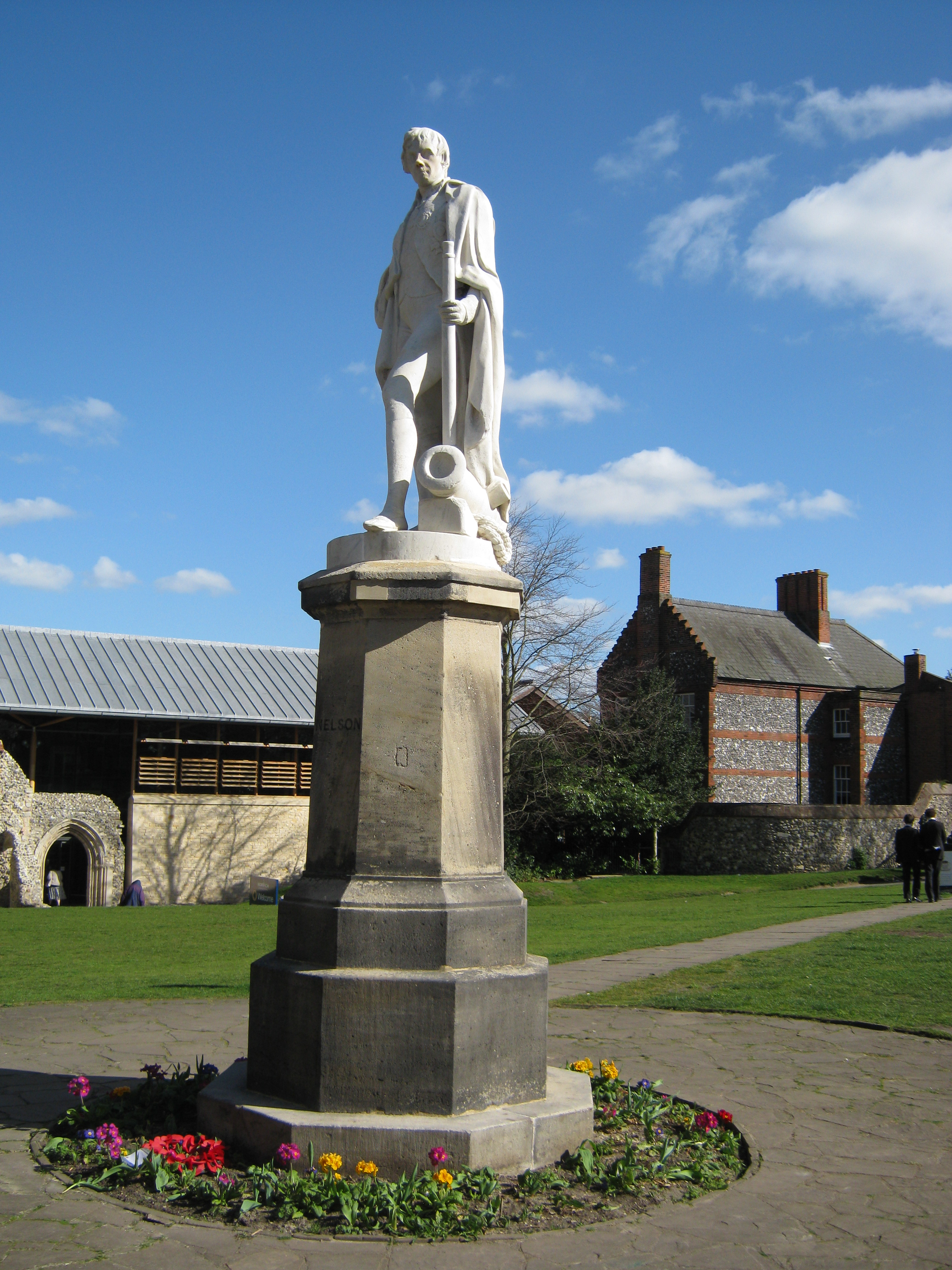
Lord Nelson, in Cathedral Close, Norwich

Milnes's works include the following:

A statue of Lord Nelson, of 1847, was unveiled in 1852 and moved in 1856 to its present site in the Cathedral Close of Norwich Cathedral. It is sculpted from Portland stone, and is Grade II listed.

A statue of the Duke of Wellington, of 1848, in Portland stone, was commissioned for the Tower of London. It was moved in 1863 and is now at the Royal Arsenal in London. It is Grade II listed.

Titus Salt, founder of the village Saltaire near Bradford, commissioned Milnes in 1856 to create a portrait bust of himself. It is made of Carrara marble, and at the base of the pedestal are an Angora goat and an alpaca. The bust is in Saltaire United Reformed Church.

The Saltaire Lions were sculpted as a result of a commission in 1858 for lions for the base of Nelson's Column in Trafalgar Square, London. After he had completed models for the sculptures, the commission was transferred to Sir Edwin Landseer. Titus Salt became interested in the models, and in consultation with his architects Henry Francis Lockwood and William Mawson, the completed sandstone sculptures were placed in Saltaire. Two lions, representing War and Peace, are in front of Victoria Hall (formerly named the Saltaire Institute), and two lions, representing Determination and Vigilance, are in front of Saltaire School. They are all Grade II* listed.

A marble statue of Edward Parker Charlesworth was unveiled in Lincoln in 1889. It is near The Lawn, formerly a mental hospital where Charlesworth was physician. It is Grade II listed.
