= Equestrian statue of the Duke of Wellington, Glasgow =

Statue by Carlo Marochetti in Glasgow, United Kingdom

Coordinates: 55°51′36″N 4°15′07″W

Queen Street Duke of Wellington Statue
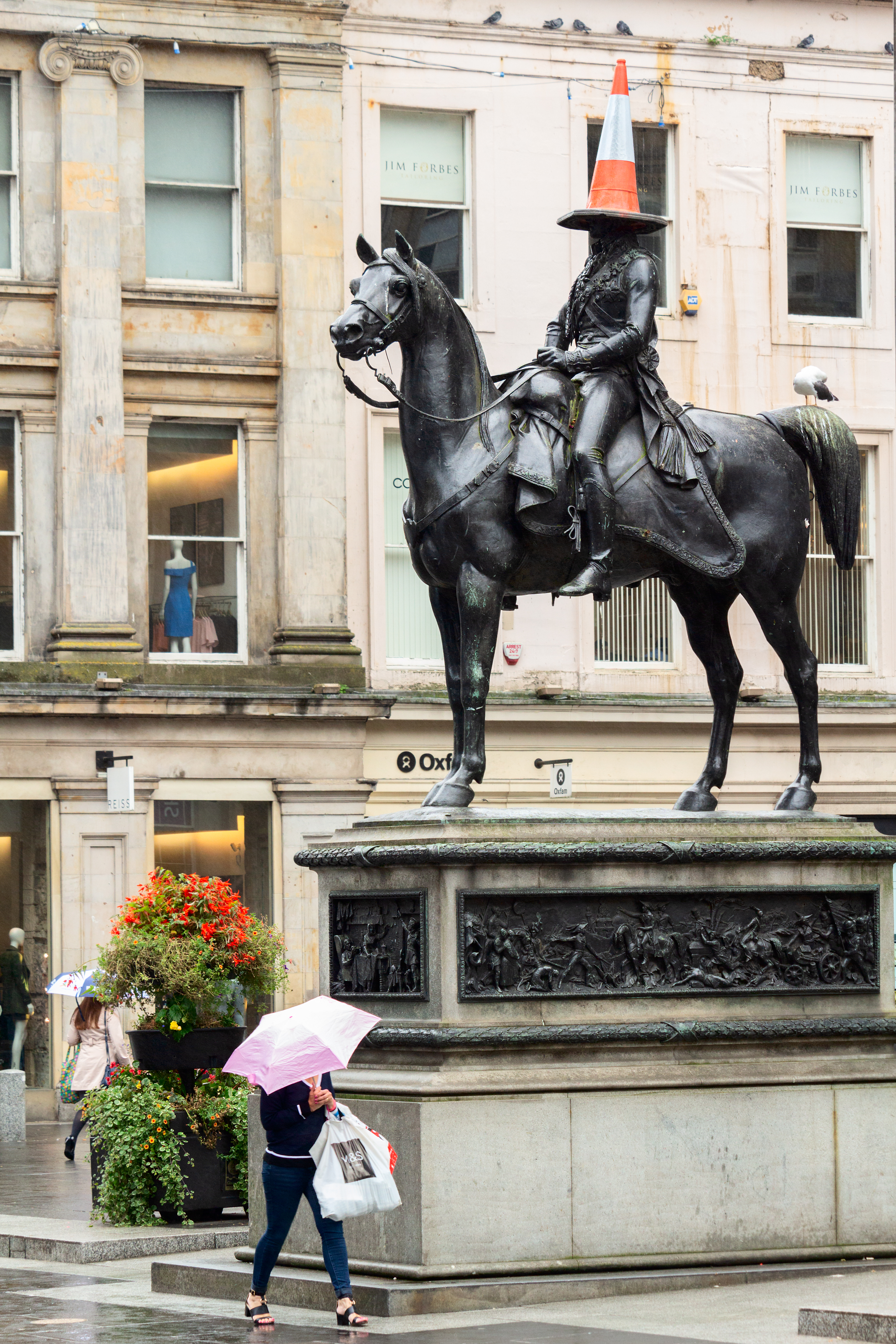
- The statue in 2018; it is known for having traffic cones placed upon its head
- Artist: Carlo Marochetti
- Year: 1844
- Medium: Bronze
- Subject: Arthur Wellesley, 1st Duke of Wellington
- Location: Glasgow, Scotland

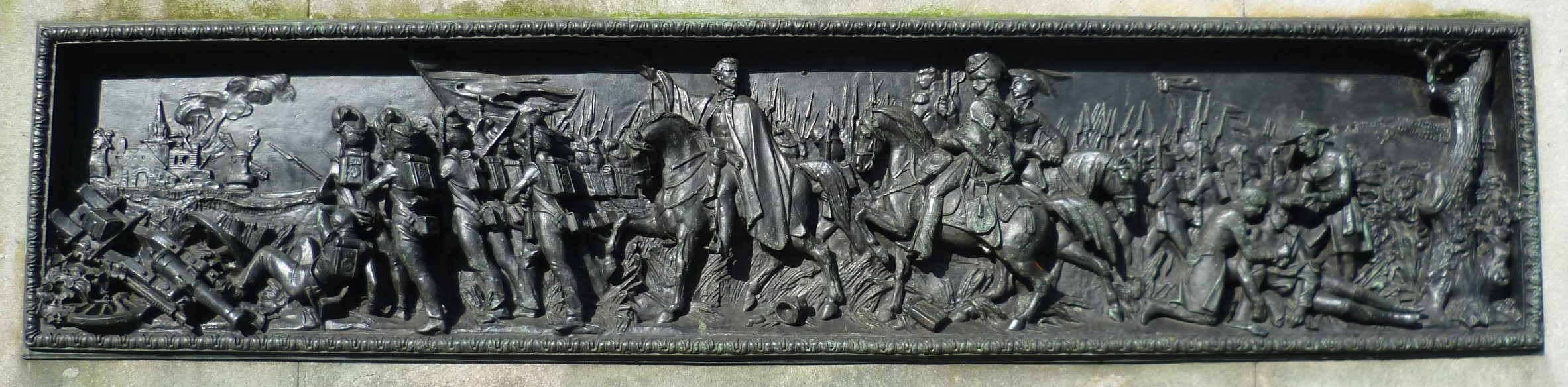
The bas-relief panel depicting the Battle of Waterloo

The equestrian statue of Field Marshal Arthur Wellesley, 1st Duke of Wellington, is located outside the Gallery of Modern Art, Glasgow (formerly the Royal Exchange) in Scotland. It is one of Glasgow's most iconic landmarks. It was sculpted by the Italian-born French artist Carlo Marochetti and erected in 1844, thanks to public funding to mark the successful end in 1815 of the Napoleonic Wars. Since at least the 1980s it has been traditionally capped with a traffic cone by members of the public. In 2011, the Lonely Planet guide included the statue in its list of the "top 10 most bizarre monuments on Earth".

== Statue ==
The statue depicts Arthur Wellesley, 1st Duke of Wellington, on his favourite horse, Copenhagen and wearing the uniform of a field marshal with the insignia of his various awards and honours. It was sculpted by the Italian-born French artist Carlo Marochetti and erected in 1844. The statue is in bronze and is mounted on a plinth made from Scottish Peterhead granite. It is Category-A listed.

A statue of Wellington in Glasgow was first proposed at a public meeting in 1840. Money for it was raised by public subscription, with around 10,000 people making donations. Carlo Marochetti was given the commission, although this choice caused controversy at the time as some objected to the selection of a non-British artist.

Marochetti completed the statue in France, and also sculpted bronze bas-reliefs, that depict the Battle of Assaye and the Battle of Waterloo. The statue was installed on a granite plinth and the bas-reliefs fixed to the sides. Two smaller bas-reliefs represent a soldier returning from war and resuming his peace-time occupation. A number of commemorative items, including papers and medals, were sealed in crystal glass bottles and placed under the statue.

The monument was inaugurated on the 8th of October 1844 in front of a crowd of around 20,000 spectators. This included 200 former soldiers who had served under Wellington and several prominent individuals, including General Neil Douglas and Archibald Alison, the Sheriff of Lanark. The ceremony included military bands, a canon-fire salute and a march-past by troops.

== Traffic cone ==
The statue is known for being capped with a traffic cone. Continued over many years, the act has been described as a display of Glaswegian humour and spirit, and is believed to date back to at least the 1980s.

On the occasion of Glasgow hosting the 2002 UEFA Champions League final, the cone was replaced by a football-patterned hat bearing the logo of one of the tournament sponsors, Amstel, and in June 2010, on the run-up to the opening of hotel chain citizenM in Glasgow, when the cone was replaced with a 'feel free' branded glitter cone.

In 2005, Glasgow City Council and Strathclyde Police took a stance of asking the public not to replace the cone, citing minor damage to the statue and the potential for injury when attempting to place one.

In 2013, Glasgow City Council put forward plans for a £65,000 restoration project, which included a proposal to double the height of its plinth and raise it to more than six feet (1.8 metres) in height to "deter all but the most determined of vandals". Their planning application contained an estimate that the cost of removing traffic cones from the statue was £100 per callout, and that this could amount to £10,000 per year. The plans were withdrawn after significant public opposition, including an online petition that received over 10,000 signatures. As the council indicated that action against the practice could still be considered, the art-political organisation National Collective organised a rally in defence of the cone.

In 2014, in support of the Scottish independence referendum, it was fitted with a "Yes" cone as well as a flag fitted in its stirrup. The cone was replaced with a gold-painted one during the 2012 Summer Olympics as a celebration of Scotland's contribution to the record haul of gold medals won by Team GB. A replica of the statue, complete with cone, appeared at the 2014 Commonwealth Games opening ceremony, and a gold cone was then again placed on the statue to mark the success of the games.

In 2015, Glasgow City Council tested CCTV software worth £1.2 million, checking to see whether it could automatically detect people putting cones on the statue, which it could. On Brexit Day (31 January 2020), pro-European supporters placed a cone painted to represent the flag of Europe on its head. During the COVID-19 pandemic it was adorned with a cone and a blue surgical mask around its ears to reflect the pandemic and lockdowns in the country. In March 2022, in support of Ukraine and as a protest against Russia's invasion of it, it was fitted with a cone with the colours of the Ukrainian flag. In June 2023, to promote his exhibition at the Gallery of Modern Art, the graffiti artist Banksy declared that the statue was his "favourite work of art in the UK". On 21 June the Scottish climate change campaigning group This Is Rigged placed a cone with their logo on the statue, and invited Banksy to support their cause.

Finnie, the mascot of the 2026 Commonwealth Games in Glasgow, is a unicorn with a traffic cone for a horn. This is an intentional reference to the statue and the tradition of putting a cone on its head.

During the 2026 World Cup, several statues in Boston, where Scotland played their initial two matches, were adorned with traffic cones in direct reference to the Glasgow tradition.

== See also ==
- List of Category A listed buildings in Glasgow
- Public statues in Glasgow
- List of monuments to Arthur Wellesley, 1st Duke of Wellington
