= Gallery of Modern Art, Glasgow =

Art museum in Glasgow, Scotland

Gallery of Modern Art
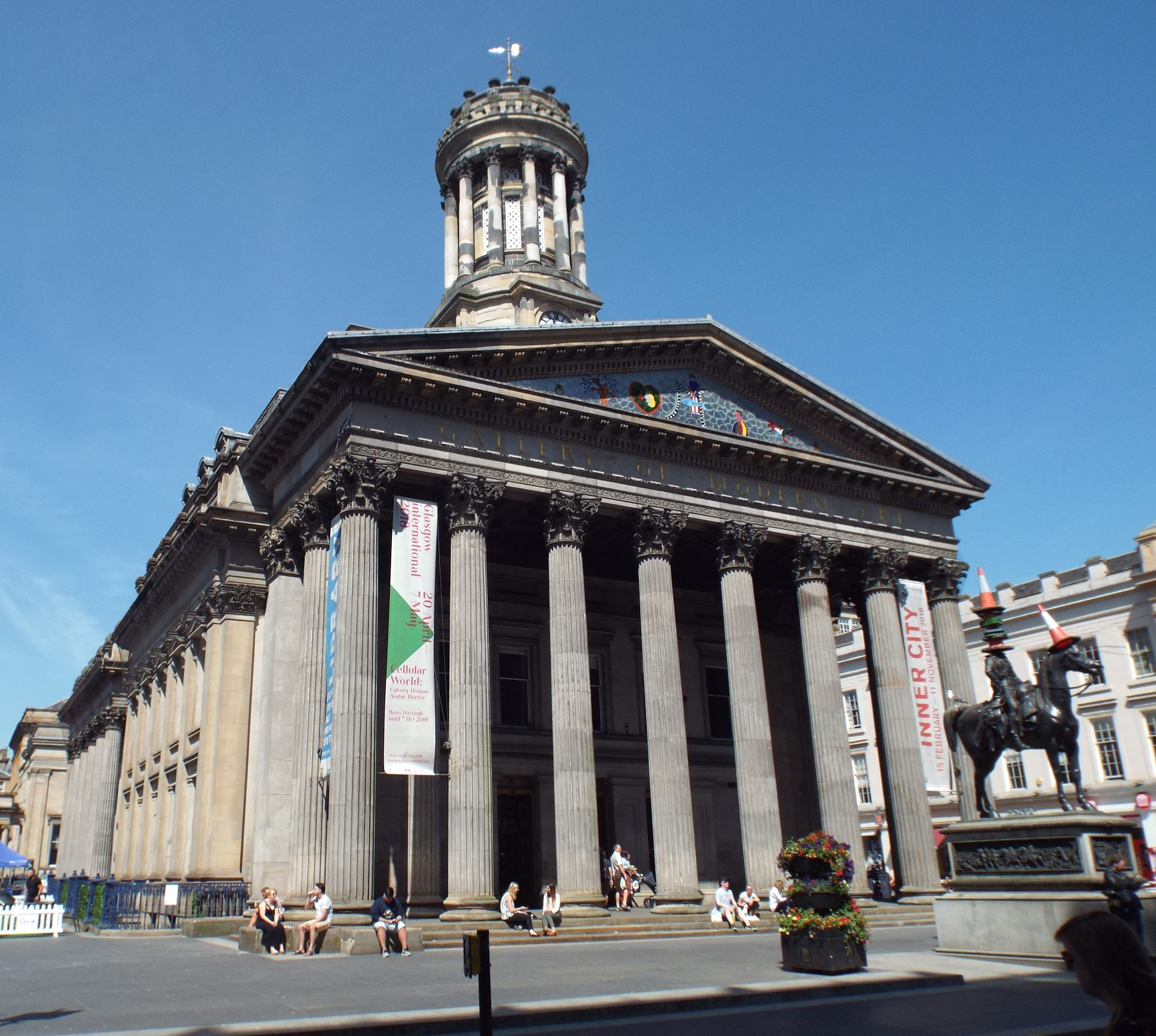
- The Gallery of Modern Art in 2018
- Established: 1996
- Location: Royal Exchange Square; Glasgow; Scotland; G1 3AH
- Coordinates: 55.8602°N 4.25249°W
- Type: Contemporary art
- Visitors: 576,689 (2019)
- Owner: Glasgow City Council
- Public transit access: Buchanan Street
- Website: Official website

Listed Building – Category A
- Designated: 6 July 1966
- Reference no.: LB32818

The Gallery of Modern Art (GoMA) is the main gallery of contemporary art in Glasgow, Scotland.

GoMA offers a programme of temporary exhibitions and workshops. GoMA displays work by local and international artists as well as addressing contemporary social issues through its major biannual projects.

Opened in 1996, the Gallery of Modern Art is housed in a neoclassical building in Royal Exchange Square in the heart of Glasgow city centre. The building was formerly a private home, a bank, and a library.

== History ==
The building was constructed in 1778 as the townhouse of William Cunninghame of Lainshaw, a Glasgow Tobacco Lord who made his fortune through the triangular slave trade. It was bought in 1817 by the Royal Bank of Scotland who later moved onto Buchanan Street; it then became the Royal Exchange. Reconstruction for this use was undertaken by David Hamilton between 1827 and 1832 and resulted in many additions to the building, namely the Corinthian pillars to the Queen Street facade, the cupola above and the large hall to the rear of the old house.

In 1954, after purchasing the building for £105,000 in 1949, Glasgow District Libraries moved the Stirling's Library into the building. It also housed the Library of Patents and the Commercial Library. It was described as:

A magnificent hall, 110 ft. by 60 ft. ... divided in to three parts by a double row of monolithic Corinthian columns and spanned by a 30ft high richly ornamented arched ceiling.

Special bookcases were aligned with the columns, lit by fluorescent lighting to illuminate the books. There was a collection of over 100 books on the pictorial arts, 300 volumes of music books and scores, and 800 books for parents. Seven-foot-high (2.1-metre) display units were used to display items. There was a magazine room with seating for fifty readers.

When the library returned to Miller Street, the building was refurbished to house the city's contemporary art collection, opening as a gallery in 1996.

== Gallery ==
The gallery has hosted several million visitors. It has a dedicated Education and Access studio, facilitating workshops and artists talks and in the basement a Learning Library. The building also contains a café, free Internet access terminals, multimedia, art, and general book-lending facilities. Exhibits include works by David Hockney, Sebastião Salgado, and Andy Warhol as well as Scottish artists such as John Bellany and Ken Currie.

The mirrored pediment on the exterior of the building is by artist Niki de Saint Phalle, entitled Tympanum (1996). Saint Phalle also installed the mirrored vestibule to the gallery.

In the summer of 2023, the gallery hosted "Cut and Run", a solo exhibition by British street artist Banksy (his first for 14 years). The show, which was open 24 hours per day for its ten week run, attracted 180,000 visitors.

== Duke of Wellington statue ==
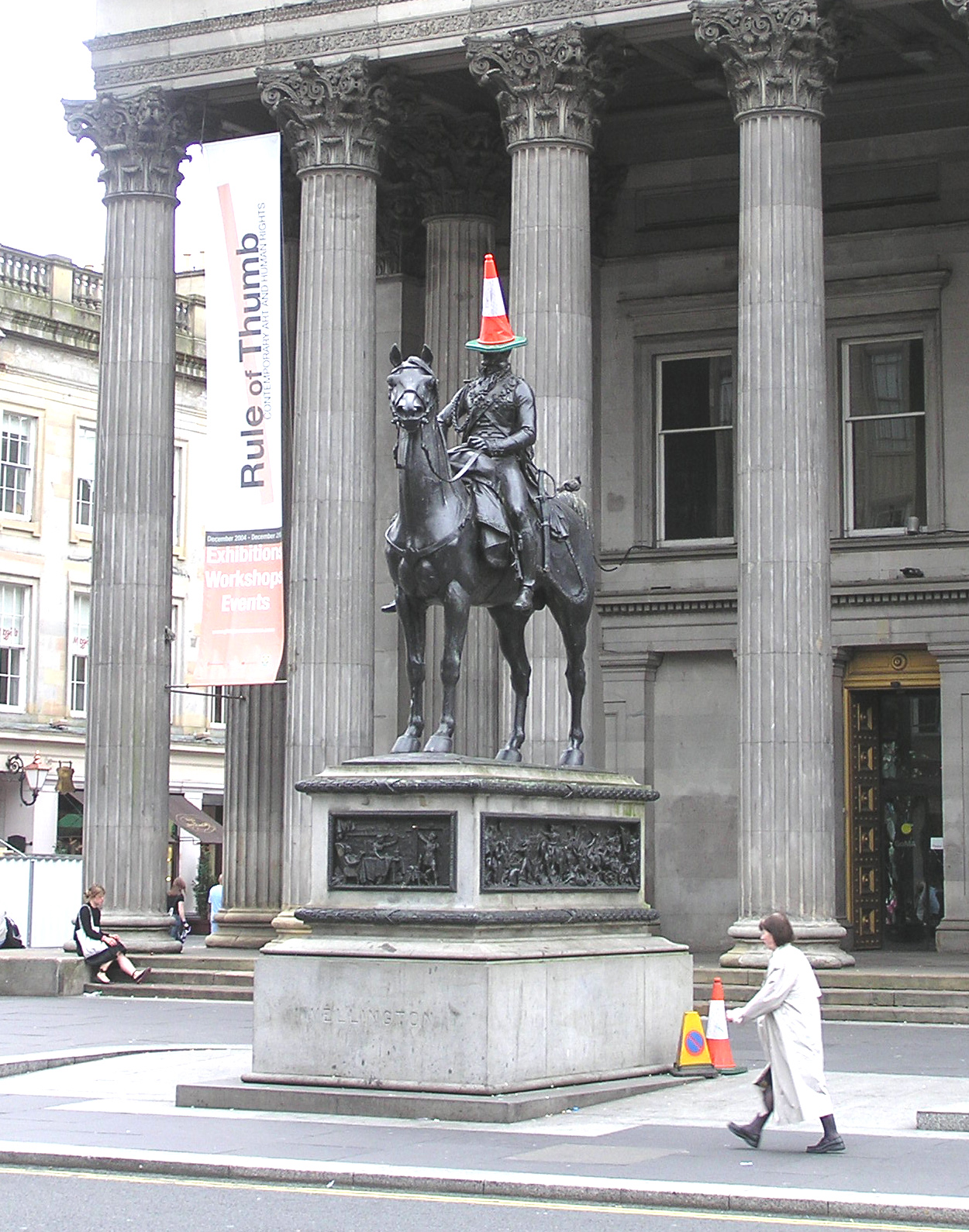
Statue of the Duke of Wellington with traffic cone

In front of the gallery stands an equestrian statue of the Duke of Wellington, sculpted by Carlo Marochetti in 1844. The statue usually has a traffic cone on its head; for many years the authorities removed cones, but the it has become a symbol of the city and a piece of public art.

== See also ==
- Culture in Glasgow
- Glasgow art
