= Thomas Clyde (film producer) =

British film producer (1917–1999)

- Born: 24 June 1917; Battle, Sussex, England
- Died: February 1999 (aged 81); Wandsworth, London, England
- Occupation: Film producer
- Years active: 1953–1973
- Spouses: Lady Elizabeth Clyde (m. 1939; div. 1960); Mary Peach (m. 1961, divorced)
- Children: 5, including Jeremy
- Relatives: William P. Clyde (grandfather); Thomas Clyde (great-grandfather)

Thomas Clyde (24 June 1917 – February 1999) was a British film producer. He was the grandson of William Pancoast Clyde, head of the Clyde Steamship Company, and the younger brother of William Pancoast “Little Billy” Clyde, the Olympic skier. He was the father of actor and musician Jeremy Clyde.

== Early life ==
Tommy Clyde was born 24 June 1917 at Battle, Sussex, the second son of William Pancoast Clyde, Jr., whose parents lived in New York City, and Dora Jessie Ellen, daughter of Joshua Taylor, of London. He was baptized 9 August 1917 at St Jude's Church, Kensington. His parents divorced when he was young, and he was raised by his mother, who married Allan G. Kyle in 1925.

Clyde was educated at Eton College where he met Valerian Wellesley, grandson of the 4th Duke of Wellington. He and Wellesley would become close friends while continuing their studies at the University of Oxford, and Clyde eventually began to date Wellesley's younger sister, Elizabeth.

In the 1930s, Clyde rode “successfully” in several point-to-point Steeplechase races.

== Career ==
Clyde served in the Royal Horse Guards, serving in the 2 HCR (Household Cavalry Regiment). He retired from the Royal Army with the rank of captain, then worked in London as a film producer, working on the following films:

- The Intruder (1953, Location Manager)
- The Colditz Story (1955, Production Manager)
- The Hostage (1956, Producer)
- Chase a Crooked Shadow (1958, Producer: in Association with)
- Moment of Danger (1960, Producer)
- Follow That Horse! (1960, Producer)
- Guns of Darkness (1962, Producer)
- Work is a 4-Letter Word (1968, Producer)
- Ghost in the Noonday Sun (1973, Executive Producer)

== Personal life ==
On 24 October 1939, Clyde announced his engagement to Elizabeth Wellesley, the only daughter of the 7th Duke of Wellington. They married on 18 November 1939 at St. Peter's Church, Vere Street, London with Elizabeth's brother, Valerian Wellesley, as best man.

In October 1959, Elizabeth was awarded a divorce decree on the grounds of adultery, and was granted custody of the couple's youngest son. The couple remained “close and supportive friends” until Clyde's death.

Tommy and Elizabeth Clyde had three sons:

- Michael Jeremy Thomas “Jeremy” Clyde (born 22 March 1941), actor and musician
- Robin Clyde (19 April 1943 – 13 February 1950)
- William Jonathan “Jonathan” Clyde (born 27 May 1949)

Clyde married actress Mary Peach on 18 May 1961 at the Chelsea Registry Office, London. They met on the set of the 1960 film Follow That Horse!, which Clyde produced. The couple separated in the 1980s and later divorced.

Tommy and Mary had two children:

- Andrew Clyde (born February 1963)
- Joanna Clyde (born 1965)

=== Death ===
Clyde died in Wandsworth, London in February 1999, at the age of 81.
