= William Clyde =

British flying ace of WWII

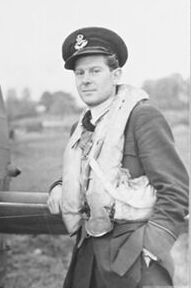
- Clyde at Exeter, November 1940
- Born: 26 July 1912; Sevenoaks, England
- Died: 25 March 1985 (aged 72); New Orleans, United States
- Military career
- Allegiance: United Kingdom
- Branch: Royal Air Force
- Rank: Group Captain
- Nickname: 'Billy'
- Unit: No. 601 Squadron
- Conflicts: Second World War: Battle of France; Battle of Britain; Circus offensive
- Awards: Distinguished Flying Cross; Mention in Despatches
- Other work: Businessman

William Clyde DFC (26 July 1912 – 25 March 1985) was a British flying ace of the Royal Air Force (RAF) during the Second World War. He is credited with the destruction of at least ten aircraft.

From Sevenoaks, Clyde was a stockbroker and served in the Auxiliary Air Force's No. 601 Squadron in the pre-war period until going on the reserve in 1938. He rejoined No. 601 Squadron on the outbreak of the Second World War. He claimed his first aerial victories during the Battle of France and several more followed in the subsequent Battle of Britain. He remained with the squadron until the end of 1941 at which time he was posted to a staff role. His later war service was affected by poor health and he was attached to the Combined Chiefs of Staff in Washington, D.C. when the war ended. Returning to civilian life, he worked for the pharmaceutical company Johnson & Johnson until his health began to fail and he retired to Mexico. He died in New Orleans in the United States in 1985, aged 72.

== Early life ==
William Pancoast Clyde, known as Billy, was born on 26 July 1912 in Sevenoaks, England, a descendant of Thomas Clyde, the founder of the Clyde Steamship Company. He was educated at Eton College before going on to study at Oxford University. After completing his tertiary studies, he spent time in Switzerland. An excellent skier, he was a British representative in the sport and was the World University Champion of 1935.

Encouraged by his friend Max Aitken, the son of the Baron Beaverbrook, Clyde joined the Auxiliary Air Force (AAF) in 1935. He flew part-time with No. 601 Squadron while working as a stockbroker in London. The squadron, the first to be formed in the AAF, was well known for its mostly affluent flying personnel. Although a fighter squadron, it was equipped with Hawker Hart light bombers until it began swapping these for the Hawker Demon fighter the year after Clyde joined. For six months in 1937 he was in the Bahamas, working as an aide to Sir Bede Clifford, the governor of the islands. He relinquished his commission in the AAF in February 1938 and was placed on the reserve. With his wife, Rosemary, who he had married the previous October, he went to the United States to work for Johnson & Johnson Surgical Dressings.

== Second World War ==
No. 601 Squadron was put on notice to prepare for hostilities just prior to the outbreak of the Second World War and Roger Bushell, one of its members, messaged Clyde, still in the United States, to warn him. Clyde made passage to the United Kingdom aboard the RMS Aquitania, arriving on 5 September. Another passenger was fellow squadron member Billy Fiske. At this time, No. 601 Squadron was based at Biggin Hill and operated the Bristol Blenheim, a twin-engined heavy fighter that Clyde had no experience on. Mostly engaged in night patrols, it reequipped with Hawker Hurricane fighters early the following year.

=== Battle of France ===
When the Germans invaded France and the Low Countries on 10 May, Clyde was sent to Merville with the squadron's 'A' flight. It was withdrawn to Tangmere after ten days, but continued to sortie to France. Clyde destroyed two Messerschmitt Bf 110 heavy fighters to the west of Dunkirk on 27 May. In recognition of his performances during the campaign in France, he was awarded the Distinguished Flying Cross four days later. The citation, published in The London Gazette, read:

This officer was posted to France in early May 1940 and has led his flight on many occasions with great skill and has set a high standard of morale and leadership.

— London Gazette, No. 34860, 31 May 1940

=== Battle of Britain ===
Returning to Tangmere, the squadron recovered from its involvement in the Battle of France and engaged in convoy patrols along the English Channel. Clyde shot down a Dornier Do 17 medium bomber that was heading to Bournemouth on a reconnaissance sortie 15 miles (24 km) from Cherbourg on 6 June. The squadron then became drawn into the Battle of Britain as the Luftwaffe commenced its campaign against British shipping traversing these waters.

On 13 August, the opening day of the Luftwaffe's campaign to destroy the RAF, Clyde flew multiple scrambles; he claimed the probable destruction of a Junkers Ju 88 medium bomber near Arundel on his first, shot down a Bf 110 to the west of Swanage and damaged another on his second, and destroyed a pair of Bf 110s over Winchester on his third. Two days later, he probably destroyed one Ju 88 and shared in the shooting down another to the east of Winchester. The next day, 16 August, he shot down a Junkers Ju 87 dive bomber off Selsey Bill, and shared in damaging a second. No. 601 Squadron was shifted to Debden, supposedly for a rest from operations, on 19 August but as the Luftwaffe increased its range of operations deeper inland, the pilots of the squadron were still called upon for interceptions. Clyde destroyed a Do 17 over the Thames estuary on 31 August.

Clyde was promoted to flight lieutenant in September. By this time, No. 601 Squadron was based at Exeter, covering the West Country, and its pace of operations were much reduced. It was largely inactive for the next several months but on 7 October Clyde destroyed a Bf 110 near Yeovil.

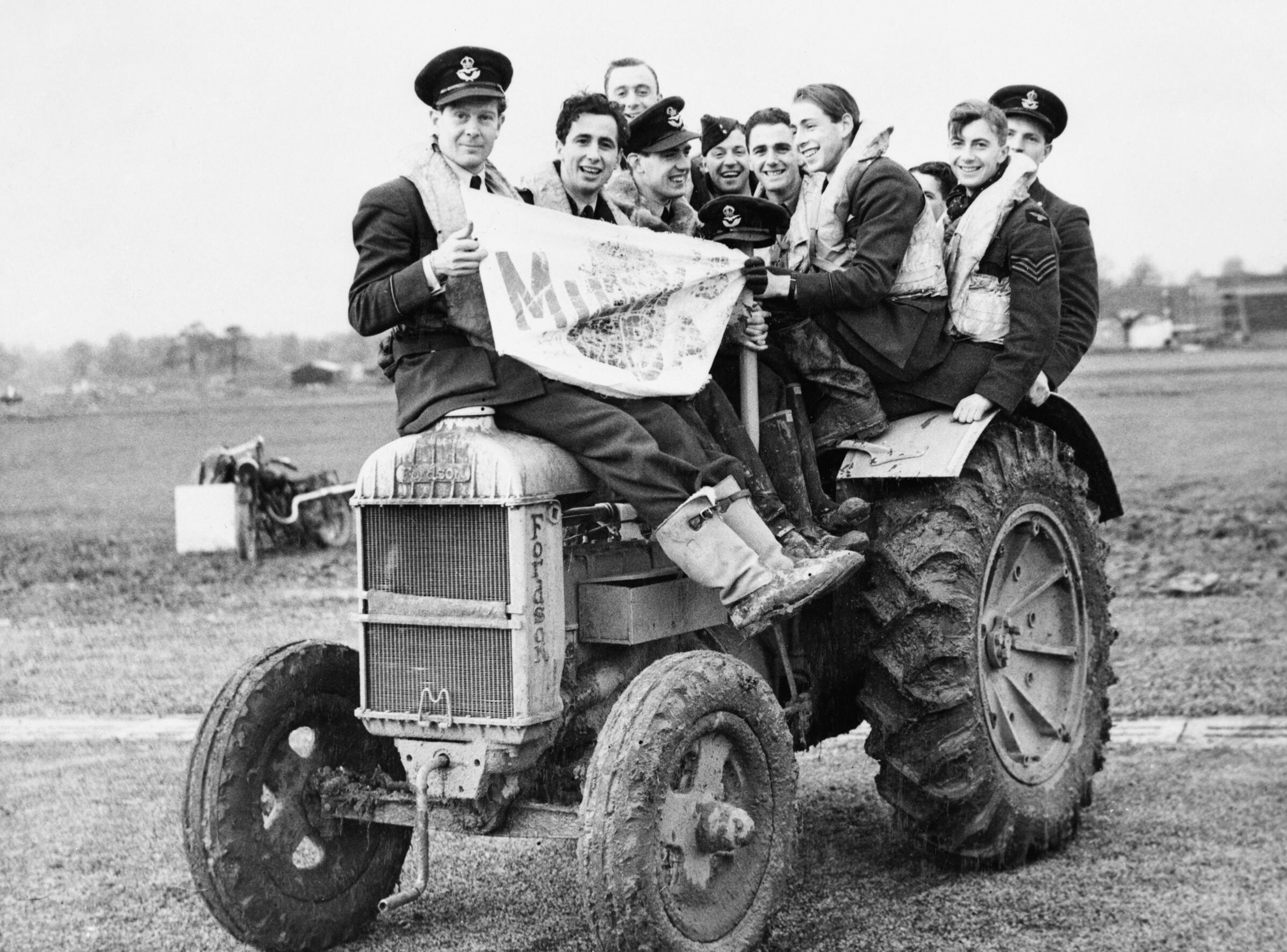
A group of No. 601 Squadron pilots at Exeter, November 1940; Clyde is first left, sitting next to fellow flight commander Thomas Grier

=== Later war service ===
From early 1941 No. 601 Squadron began to fly on fighter sweeps to German-occupied France as part of the RAF's Circus offensive. In August the squadron was withdrawn to Duxford to begin equipping with the Bell P-39 Airacobra fighter. This American-supplied aircraft was unsuccessful and the squadron was the only unit in the RAF to use the type; suffering a high accident rate, the aircraft was used on one operational sortie but otherwise saw no action. In December, Clyde, now holding the rank of squadron leader, was one of only two of the squadron's initial complement to still be serving and he was rested with a posting as a staff officer. He was mentioned in despatches in the 1942 New Year Honours.

Clyde's duties for the next several months involved the planning of the RAF's offensive operations. In January 1944, he was promoted to temporary wing commander. He began to suffer health problems and was hospitalised for a time. On recovery, he was posted to the United States to serve in Washington, D.C. as the Deputy Director (Air) for the Combined Chiefs of Staff. His wing commander rank was made substantive in October.

== Later life ==
Released from the RAF in late 1945 as a group captain, Clyde resumed his career with Johnson & Johnson. He became a deputy director of the company, with responsibility for its factories in several countries. In 1948, he suffered a recurrence of the health problems that affected his war service and was hospitalised in India. He resumed work after receiving treatment but retired the following year after being advised that his condition could be fatal if he continued to overexert himself.

Planning to settle in Sri Lanka, Clyde instead moved to Acapulco in Mexico on advice from friends. After several months, his health was restored. In his later years he assisted expatriates in moving to Acapulco. He died in New Orleans in the United States on 25 March 1985. Cremated, his ashes were scattered in the sea off Acapulco.

Clyde is credited with having destroyed ten aircraft, one being shared with another pilot. He is also believed to have probably destroyed two more aircraft and damaged two others.
