= Lady Elizabeth Clyde =

British socialite (1918–2013)

- Born: Elizabeth Wellesley; 26 December 1918
- Died: 25 November 2013 (aged 94)
- Spouse: Thomas Clyde (m. 1939; div. 1960)
- Children: 3, including Jeremy
- Parent(s): Gerald Wellesley, 7th Duke of Wellington; Dorothy Violet Ashton
- Relatives: Arthur Valerian Wellesley, 8th Duke of Wellington (brother)

Lady Elizabeth Clyde (born Elizabeth Wellesley, 26 December 1918 – 25 November 2013) was an English socialite. She was the daughter of Gerald Wellesley, 7th Duke of Wellington, and Dorothy Violet Ashton, and thus a great-great-granddaughter of Arthur Wellesley, 1st Duke of Wellington.

== Early life ==
Elizabeth Wellesley was born on Boxing Day 1918 to Gerald and Dorothy Wellesley (née Ashton) in London. She was christened in the Chapel Royal, St. James Palace with the special permission of King George V. Soon after her birth, the family purchased two homes: 43 Portland Place in London, and Sherfield Court in Hampshire.

== Personal life ==
Clyde announced her engagement to Major Thomas Clyde of the Royal Horse Guards, son of William Pancoast Clyde, Jr., on 24 October 1939. They married on 18 November 1939 at St. Peter's Church, Vere Street, in London, with her brother Valerian as best man. A reception followed at her father's home at Chester Terrace, featuring a wedding cake designed by Rex Whistler and made by Fortnum & Mason.

The family lived at Dorney, Buckinghamshire.

Her children are:

- Jeremy Clyde (born 22 March 1941), actor and musician
- Robin Clyde (19 April 1943 – 13 February 1950)
- William Jonathan Clyde (born 27 May 1949)

Clyde filed for divorce in 1959 on grounds of adultery, and was granted custody of the couple's youngest son. She and Thomas remained "close and supportive friends" until his death in 1999.

She retired to Bramley, Hampshire.
