= A Gathering of Eagles =

1963 film by Delbert Mann

- Promotional poster for A Gathering of Eagles
- Directed by: Delbert Mann
- Screenplay by: Robert Pirosh
- Story by: Sy Bartlett
- Produced by: Sy Bartlett
- Starring: Rock Hudson; Rod Taylor; Mary Peach; Barry Sullivan
- Cinematography: Russell Harlan
- Edited by: Russell F. Schoengarth; Robert Schulte
- Music by: Jerry Goldsmith; Tom Lehrer
- Production company: Universal Pictures
- Distributed by: Universal International Pictures
- Release date: June 21, 1963
- Running time: 116 minutes
- Country: United States
- Language: English
- Budget: $3,346,500
- Box office: $2,500,000 (US/Canada)

A Gathering of Eagles is a 1963 SuperScope Eastmancolor film directed by Delbert Mann about the U.S. Air Force during the Cold War and the pressures of command. The plot is patterned after the World War II film Twelve O'Clock High (1949), which producer-screenwriter Sy Bartlett also wrote, with elements mirroring Above and Beyond (1952) and Toward the Unknown (1956), written by his collaborator, Beirne Lay Jr..

Rock Hudson plays United States Air Force colonel Jim Caldwell, a Strategic Air Command (SAC) B-52 wing commander who must prepare his unit to pass a grueling operational readiness inspection.

The film also stars Rod Taylor, Mary Peach, Barry Sullivan, Kevin McCarthy, Henry Silva, Robert Lansing, Leif Erickson and Richard Anderson.

== Plot ==
The inspector general of the Strategic Air Command (SAC), Major General "Happy Jack" Kirby, lands unannounced at an Air Force base in California, home to an important strategic aerospace wing, and declares an unannounced operational readiness inspection (ORI). His team discovers many problems and Kirby reports unfavorably to his superior, General Hewitt.

Hewitt replaces Kirby with his own aide, Colonel Jim Caldwell, whose assistant is to be his old and trusted friend, Hollis Farr.

Caldwell immediately sees many reasons for the low standards of training and readiness and institutes a number of harsh policies that bring him into conflict with Farr. Caldwell faces the unwelcome truth that Farr is too undisciplined and gives him notice of dismissal. This causes a rift between Caldwell and his wife Victoria, who thinks that her rumored affair with Farr may have cost him his job.

While Caldwell is absent on a hospital visit, he is suddenly told of an emergency on the base, as an unidentified aircraft is on final approach with no signal, a likely surprise ORI. Caldwell is unable to return in time to handle the critical opening stages and Farr assumes command, successfully launching all bombers, but only by breaking a key regulation that could cause them to fail their inspection. When Kirby demands an explanation, Caldwell defends Farr, stating that he would have made the same call. To their surprise, Kirby admits that he too would have done the same and that the wing has passed its test. It seems clear that Farr will retain his job.

During the ORI, Victoria performs volunteer duty at the base hospital. A young airman awakes after surgery, and his first request is that she check that the ORI is progressing well. Once Caldwell and Victoria are both home, he apologizes for putting SAC first, and she explains that the airman made her realize how the entire base is focused on their critical work, and they lovingly embrace.

== Cast ==
- Rock Hudson as Colonel James Caldwell, Commander, 904th Strategic Aerospace Wing (904th SAW)
- Rod Taylor as Colonel Hollis Farr, Vice Commander, 904th SAW
- Mary Peach as Victoria Caldwell, Caldwell's wife
- Barry Sullivan as Colonel William Fowler, Base Commander of Carmody Air Force Base
- Kevin McCarthy as Major General J. T. "Happy Jack" Kirby, SAC Inspector General
- Nelson Leigh as Brigadier General John Aymes, commander of the 904th SAW's parent Air Division
- Henry Silva as Colonel Joe "Smokin' Joe" Garcia, Deputy Commander for Maintenance, 904th SAW
- Leora Dana as Evelyn Fowler, Col Fowler's wife
- Robert Lansing as Senior Master Sergeant Banning, B-52 line chief
- Richard Le Pore as Staff Sergeant Kemler, boom operator on KC-135 tanker crew "Ramrod 67," who comes out of surgery in the base hospital asking how his crew did in the ORI.
- Ray Montgomery as Captain Linke, aircraft commander of B-52G bomber crew "Ranger 21"
- Richard Anderson as Colonel Ralph Josten, Deputy Commander for Operations, 904th SAW
- Leif Erickson as General Hewitt, Commander-in-Chief, Strategic Air Command (CINCSAC)
- Louise Fletcher as Mrs. Kemler, Sergeant Kemler's wife

== Production ==
General Curtis LeMay, USAF (former head of the Strategic Air Command and serving at the time as Chief of Staff of the Air Force), used his influence to allow producer Sy Bartlett and director Delbert Mann unprecedented access to various SAC facilities in the belief that the film would remind Americans that the Air Force had powerful weapons under tight control. Mann, a former World War II bomber pilot who had won an Academy Award for his first film (Marty), was eager to demonstrate that he could direct serious material and not merely light-hearted comedies.

Filming took place at Beale Air Force Base, California featuring the Boeing B-52 Stratofortress, Boeing KC-135 Stratotanker and Lockheed T-33 aircraft, Martin Marietta Titan I missile sites and personnel of the 456th Strategic Aerospace Wing. The military housing shown in several scenes is still used today as base housing at Beale for senior commanders of the 9th Reconnaissance Wing.

It was originally announced that John Gavin would support Rock Hudson.

Tom Lehrer wrote one original song for this film, "The SAC Song". Rod Taylor, as Hollis Farr, performs this song at a party for officers and their wives.

As Bartlett and Mann were filming at SAC headquarters at Offutt Air Force Base in Omaha, Nebraska, they noticed that SAC personnel were unusually tense. They would later learn that SAC had recently learned of Nikita Khrushchev's plan to introduce nuclear-tipped ballistic missiles into Cuba.

A subplot in the film in which Colonel Farr has an affair with Colonel Caldwell's wife, played by Mary Peach, was removed during postproduction. The original choice for Mary Peach's role was Julie Andrews, but according to screenwriter Robert Pirosh, Mann thought that Andrews could not act, only sing. Pirosh felt there was no rapport between Hudson and Peach.

== Allusions to actual history ==
This film depicts the operations of a typical strategic aerospace wing (nuclear bombers, aerial refueling aircraft and ICBMs) of the Strategic Air Command during the early 1960s. The term "operational readiness inspection" (ORI) was used from the 1960s through the 1990s in reference to exercises evaluating the combat readiness of SAC, TAC, USAFE and PACAF units to execute their nuclear mission. An ORI would involve the unannounced arrival of a KC-135 with approximately 70 personnel on board who would then conduct a week-long evaluation of every aspect of the base and unit readiness.

When General Curtis LeMay became SAC commander in 1948, he undertook a number of base inspections, frequently flying unannounced to SAC bases. LeMay insisted on rigorous training and very high standards of performance for all SAC personnel and reportedly commented, "I have neither the time nor the inclination to differentiate between the incompetent and the merely unfortunate." A poor showing during one of these inspections could result in the immediate replacement of the base's wing commander, as well as on-site demotions for poorly performing airmen or immediate promotions for officers and airmen who performed well.

Air Force colonel Daniel J. Bigelow was the pilot of the B-52G and acted as stand-in for Rock Hudson when Colonel Caldwell was depicted as flying the B-52G.

The number of the 904th, and the name of its base, Carmody, are both fictitious. The film is dedicated to the officers, airmen and wives of the 456th Aerospace Wing of the Strategic Air Command.

== Reception ==
In a contemporary review for The New York Times, critic A. H. Weiler praised the film's realism but lamented its lack of dramatic impact:

These eagles of the Strategic Air Command are rough, tough, alert birds but their feathers are constantly ruffled and their tempers fray to the point of hysteria. The sporadic drama they project does not seem to relate realistically entirely to the scientifically exact world of the highly specialized warriors of SAC despite the obvious striving for authenticity in this production. ... ''That sure was a cliffhanger," an officer says at the successful conclusion of the climactic test. This is not precisely true. This "Gathering of Eagles'' only occasionally soars with excitement or quickens the pulse.

== Awards ==
A Gathering of Eagles received an Academy Award nomination for Best Sound Effects (Robert Bratton) in 1963.

== See also ==
- List of American films of 1963
- Strategic Air Command (film)
- Bombers B-52
