= Jeremy Clyde =

English actor and musician (born 1941)

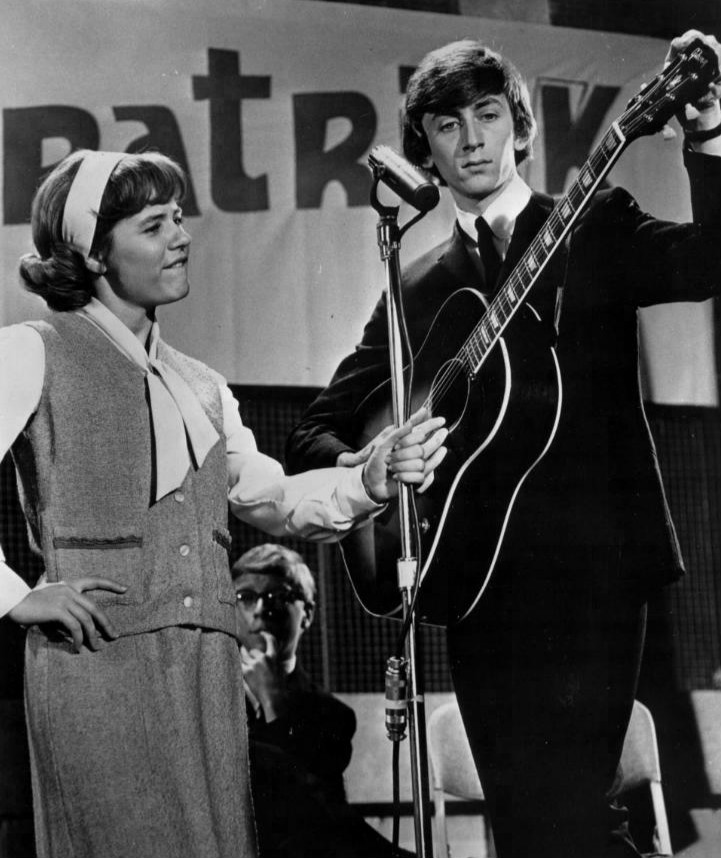
- Patty Duke and Jeremy Clyde in The Patty Duke Show (1965)
- Born: Michael Jeremy Thomas Clyde; 22 March 1941 (age 85); Dorney, Buckinghamshire, England
- Education: Royal Central School of Speech and Drama
- Occupations: Actor, musician
- Years active: 1953–present
- Spouse: Vanessa Field (m. 1970, divorced)
- Children: 2
- Parents: Thomas Clyde (father); Lady Elizabeth Clyde (mother)
- Relatives: Gerald Wellesley, 7th Duke of Wellington (grandfather); William P. Clyde (great-grandfather)

Michael Jeremy Thomas Clyde (born 22 March 1941) is an English actor and musician. During the 1960s, he was one-half of the folk duo Chad & Jeremy (with Chad Stuart). Their first song was the 1963 hit "Yesterday’s Gone". The duo became more successful in America than in their native country. Clyde has enjoyed a long television acting career, often playing upper-middle class or aristocratic characters.

== Early life ==
Clyde was born in the village of Dorney in the English county of Buckinghamshire and is the son of Lady Elizabeth Wellesley and her husband Thomas Clyde.

Through his maternal line, Clyde is the great-great-great-grandson of Arthur Wellesley, 1st Duke of Wellington, and is a cousin of the Duke of Wellington.

In 1953, he participated in the coronation of Queen Elizabeth II as a Page of Honour for his grandfather and carried his grandfather's coronet during the ceremony.

Clyde was educated at two independent schools, Ludgrove and Eton and then at the University of Grenoble.

== Television ==
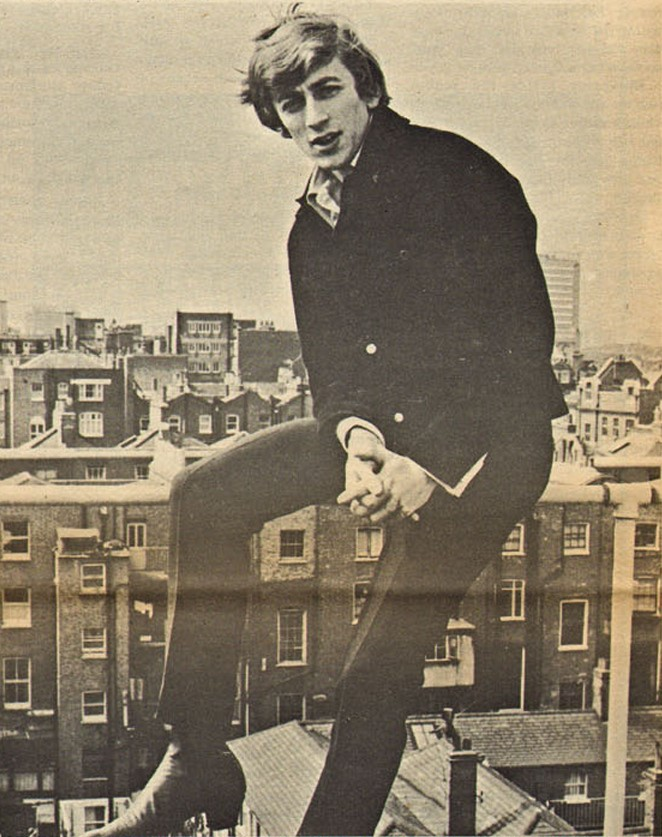
Clyde on February 19, 1966, issue of KRLA Beat

In 1970, he played Teddy, the prospective buyer of a haunted house, in the 'Suspicious Ignorance' episode of Tales of Unease, alongside Tessa Wyatt.

Clyde once guest-starred in an episode of the American sitcom My Three Sons (season 8 episode 16, "Liverpool Saga"), when Chip Douglas is introduced to their neighbor's cousin, Paul Drayton, as a well known folk guitarist in Britain, excited that someone from Liverpool was coming to visit and expecting him to be a talented musician (implying the success of the Beatles; the episode aired during the height of Beatlemania).

He appeared in the BBC TV adaptation of Moll Flanders in 1975.

In 1979, he played Godfried Schalcken in the BBC's television horror story Schalcken the Painter.

In the late 1970s he appeared alongside Lorraine Chase in a series of television advertisements for Campari.

He is perhaps best known for his portrayal of villainous Austrian Imperial Governor Hermann Gessler, in the action series Crossbow (1987–1989), which incorporated Clyde's ability to convey evil in a distinctly aristocratic way.

His other notable acting role was as Dick Spackman in the ITV sitcom Is it Legal?.

Clyde also portrayed King Charles I in the BBC series By the Sword Divided (1983–85), which depicted the English Civil War.

Clyde also starred as Algernon Moncrieff in 1985 in the Great Performances production of Oscar Wilde's The Importance of Being Earnest, opposite Gary Bond as Jack Worthing and Dame Wendy Hiller as Lady Bracknell.

In the same year, he played the civil servant Densher in Blott on the Landscape.

In 1999 he starred as tycoon Bill Mitchell in Strangler's Wood, episode 2 of series 2 of Midsomer Murders on ITV.

In 2002, Clyde appeared in The Falklands Play (a BBC dramatisation of the Falklands War) as Sir Nicholas Henderson, the British ambassador to the United States at the time.

In 2004, he appeared in the BBC drama series The Alan Clark Diaries as British Conservative politician Jonathan Aitken, and also appeared in the BBC drama series Ashes To Ashes as the Superintendent, which was aired in 2008.

== Radio ==
He has also acted on the radio, portraying the gentleman thief A. J. Raffles in the BBC radio series Raffles (1985–1993). He has also portrayed Ngaio Marsh's fictional detective Inspector Roderick Alleyn.

In 1982 he played the role of Carruthers in a three part BBC World Service adaptIon of The Riddle of the Sands

== Theatre ==
In 1965, Clyde appeared in a stage production of The Passion Flower Hotel, a musical adaptation written by John Barry and Trevor Peacock, at the Prince of Wales Theatre in London. It also featured Jane Birkin, Francesca Annis, Pauline Collins, Nicky Henson, and Bill Kenwright.

In 1969, he appeared in Conduct Unbecoming as part of the original cast, which included Paul Jones. He also travelled to the US as part of the original Broadway cast.

In 2011, Clyde played Lord Halifax in Three Days in May at Trafalgar Studios in London. The play, which featured actor Warren Clarke as Prime Minister Winston Churchill, was set during May 1940, at a point in WWII when the idea of negotiating peace with Hitler was being floated around.

In 2017 he played Dennis in The Girls at the Phoenix Theatre in the West End.

== Other performances ==
He also played in The Iron Lady, in (2011).

Since 2018, Clyde has been performing with Peter Asher of Peter & Gordon fame.

== Personal life ==
Clyde is the eldest of three sons born to Lady Elizabeth Clyde and Captain Thomas Clyde.

Clyde is divorced from Vanessa Field, whom he married in 1970 at Fifth Avenue Presbyterian Church in New York City. They have two children.

== Partial filmography ==
- The Dick Van Dyke Show ("The Redcoats Are Coming") (1965) – Freddy
- The Patty Duke Show ("Patty Pits Wits, Two Brits Hits") (1965) – Nigel
- Batman ("The Bat's Kow Tow") (1966) – himself
- The Great St. Trinian's Train Robbery (1966) – Monty
- Laredo (“That’s Noway, Thataway“) (1966) – Newton Weeks
- My Three Sons ("Liverpool Saga") (1967) – Paul Drayton
- The Felony Squad ("Kiss Me Kill You") (1968) - Tony Sloan
- Doctor Watson and the Darkwater Hall Mystery (1974) – Miles
- The Pallisers (1974) – Gerard Maule
- The Flight Fund (1975) – Tony
- Silver Bears (1977) – Nick Topping
- Raffles (1977) – Alick Carruthers
- The Duchess of Duke Street ("The Patriots") (1977) – Mr Appleby
- Sexton Blake and the Demon God (1978) – Sexton Blake
- North Sea Hijack (1979) – Tipping
- Lady Killers (1980) – Mr. Kapadia
- Charles & Diana: A Royal Love Story (1982) – Andrew Parker Bowles
- Magnolia Blossom (1982) – Richard Darrell
- Invitation to the Wedding (1983) – Teddy Barrington
- Bergerac (1986) Series 5, Episode 1: “Memory Man” – Smythe
- Bust (1988) Series 2, Episode 4: "Love Bait" – Hon. Marcus Creighton
- Wilt (1990) – Hugh
- Splitting Heirs (1993) – 14th Duke
- Kaspar Hauser (1993) – Lord Stanhope
- Wycliffe 1994 The Dead Flautist Lord Hugh Botrell
- Is It Legal? (1995–1996) 14 episodes - Dick Spackman
- The Moth (1997) – Reginald Thorman
- Taggart ("Out of Bounds") (1998) – Charles Brown
- Midsomer Murders (1999) – Bill Mitchell - Strangler's Wood
- Bodywork (2001) – Boss
- The Musketeer (2001) – Duke of Buckingham
- Mangal Pandey: The Rising (2005) – Maj.-Gen. John Hearsey
- The Iron Lady (2011) – James T
- Downton Abbey (2011) – General Robertson
- Candle to Water (2012) – Boothy
