= The Ghost of Peter Sellers =

2018 feature documentary film

- Directed by: Peter Medak
- Produced by: Paul Iacovou
- Starring: Peter Sellers; Spike Milligan; Peter Medak; John Heyman; Norma Farnes; Tony Franciosa
- Cinematography: Christopher Sharman
- Edited by: Joby Gee
- Music by: Jack Ketch
- Production company: Vegas Media
- Distributed by: 1091 Pictures
- Release dates: 30 August 2018 (Telluride); 21 June 2020
- Running time: 93 minutes
- Country: Cyprus
- Language: English

The Ghost of Peter Sellers is a 2018 documentary film directed by Peter Medak and produced by Paul Iacovou. A cautionary tale about filmmaking, it recounts the sequence of how Peter Sellers, one of the biggest comedy actors at the time, in 1973 was attached to a pirate-themed comedy film for Columbia Pictures entitled Ghost in the Noonday Sun. He lost confidence in the film immediately and tried to sabotage it, first firing the producers before turning on his friend (and the film's young director), Peter Medak. Despite an illustrious career and the passing of 43 years since the unraveling of the production, Medak is still reeling from the disastrous experience and carrying the wounds inflicted by Sellers and the film's failure. The Ghost of Peter Sellers received its premiere at the 2018 Venice Film Festival as part of the Giornate degli Autori section, and was premiered in the United States at the 2018 Telluride Film Festival.

The Ghost of Peter Sellers received widespread acclaim from film critics, who praised Medak's willingness to revisit a dark period both professionally and personally. The wider film community has taken the film under its wings as a rare insight into how a film production unravels. The documentary spent 2019 traveling to film festivals around the world, picking up numerous awards, such as Best Documentary at The Beverly Hills Film Festival in April 2019.

== Synopsis ==
In September 1973, Peter Sellers was signed to star in a 17th-century pirate comedy, to be filmed in Cyprus for Columbia Pictures. What followed was a game of cat and mouse between Sellers, Director Peter Medak, cast, crew, and movie executives as Sellers repeatedly attempted to shut down the film. Sellers was in a personal and professional void at the start of filming; his recent failed relationship with Liza Minnelli and a number of poorly received films had spun him into a dark period, giving rise to a roller coaster of incidents during production, from sabotage to mutiny, from agonizing shooting schedules in cold temperatures to Spike Milligan’s frantic on-set rewrites. The film was somehow completed, but Columbia Pictures never released it to theaters.

The 2018 film illustrates the insanity of the 1973 production while illuminating a rising young director. Medak had made three well-received films in five years, including The Ruling Class in 1972 with Peter O’ Toole (nominated both for the Palme d'Or and an Academy Award). The 1973 failed effort with Sellers put a significant damper on Medak's career.

Although four decades had passed, Medak still felt the wounds from Sellers' actions, and The Ghost of Peter Sellers became his opportunity to tell the story of what happened on that film and release the weight associated with its failure. The film also documents the inner workings of the movie business, the lunacy of production when it unravels, and how the bankability of an actor can be the catalyst for a project but also its nemesis. It is a comic-tragic feature documentary about what it takes to be a film director and survive one's biggest disaster.

== Reception ==
On review aggregator website Rotten Tomatoes, the film holds an approval rating of 95%. The site's critical consensus reads, "A soul-searching act of therapy for its director, The Ghost of Peter Sellers offers absorbing insight into how some decisions -- and people -- can haunt us long after they're gone." Film Critic Todd McCarthy, writing in The Hollywood Reporter praised the film for its detail, calling it a "can't-take-your-eyes-off-it documentary". IMDB Editor Keith Simanton included the documentary in his 'Top 25 Films of 2018': "Not since Lost in La Mancha (by Terry Gilliam) have I seen anything so heartbreaking as this behind-the-scenes expose...'Ghost' ups the ante over 'La Mancha' however, by having the man at the center of the matter, Medak, directing, narrating, exorcising the guilt over a truly insane shoot, and laying to rest his animosity towards a troubled genius 45 years after the fact".

Critic Leonard Maltin, in his review of the Telluride Film Festival, asked "Why would a man who has worked successfully in film and television all these years (with some great ones like The Ruling Class to his credit) choose to revisit the greatest nightmare of his career? Ghost created a wound in Medak that has never healed. In spite of all the trouble Sellers caused, Medak still loves and admires him and wanted to tell this story. This fascinating feature documentary deserves a home like TCM to reach its target audience".

Forbes Contributor Jim Amos called The Ghost of Peter Sellers "as captivating as any Hollywood blockbuster - there have been many documentaries which have provided a microscope into ill-fated productions, including Hearts of Darkness: A Filmmaker’s Apocalypse, Lost in La Mancha, and the Fitzcarraldo documentary, Burden of Dreams. But The Ghost of Peter Sellers is one of the precious few which is told in the first person." Entertainment website 'The Playlist' cited Medak's documentary: "Emotionally and psychologically, “The Ghost Of Peter Sellers,” is an A-grade film".
