= Peter Medak =

Hungarian-British film and television director (1937–2026)

- Born: Péter Medák; 23 December 1937; Budapest, Hungary
- Died: 27 October 2026 (aged 88); Los Angeles, California, U.S.
- Occupation: Director
- Years active: 1968–2026
- Spouses: Katherine LaKermance (m. 1963; died 1972) Carolyn Seymour (m. 1973; div. 1984) Julia Migenes (m. 1988; div. 2003)
- Children: 4
- Website: petermedak.net

Péter Medák (23 December 1937 – 27 October 2026) was a Hungarian-British film and television director. During his long career, Medák worked on a variety of genres, from comedy and drama to horror and documentary. His most acclaimed film is The Ruling Class (1972), which was nominated for several awards, including the Palme d'Or at the 1972 Cannes Film Festival. In television, he directed episodes for the series Faerie Tale Theatre (1982–1987), The Twilight Zone (1985–1989), The Wire (2002–2008), Breaking Bad (2008–2013) and Hannibal (2013–2015).

== Early life ==
Born in Budapest, Hungary, he was the son of Elisabeth (née Diamounstein) and Gyula Medák, a textile manufacturer. His family was Jewish. They evaded the Holocaust by fleeing their home, living for eight months in a basement under assumed names, and attending church each week to pose as Christians. In 1956, he fled his native country for the United Kingdom due to the Hungarian Uprising. There he embarked on a career in the film industry, starting as a trainee and gradually rising to the position of film director.

== Career ==
Medak was signed to direct television films for MCA Universal Pictures in 1963. In 1967, he signed with Paramount Pictures to make feature films. His first such film was Negatives (1968).

Some of his most notable other works are The Ruling Class (1972), The Changeling (1980), The Krays (1990), Let Him Have It (1991) and Romeo is Bleeding (1993).

He also directed a number of television episodes and films, including The Feast of All Saints (a mini-series), Homicide: Life on the Street, The Wire and Carnivàle.

== Personal life and death ==
His marriage to his first wife, Katherine LaKermance, with whom he had two children, ended when she died in London in 1972. He had two further children with his second wife, British actress Carolyn Seymour, from whom he was divorced in 1984. Medak's third wife was opera singer Julia Migenes; the marriage lasted from 1988 to 2003.

Medák died in Los Angeles on 27 October 2026, aged 88.

== Partial filmography ==
- Negatives (1968)
- A Day in the Death of Joe Egg (1972)
- The Ruling Class (1972)
- The Third Girl From the Left (1973)
- Ghost in the Noonday Sun (1974)
- The Odd Job (1978)
- The Changeling (1980)
- The Babysitter (1980)
- Zorro, The Gay Blade (1981)
- Cry for the Strangers (1982)
- Hart to Hart (1982)
- Faerie Tale Theatre (1984)
  - Episode 3.03 "Pinocchio"
  - Episode 3.05 "Snow White and the Seven Dwarves"
  - Episode 4.02 "The Snow Queen"
  - Episode 4.07 "The Emperor's New Clothes"
  - Episode 6.03 "The Dancing Princesses"
- The Twilight Zone (1985)
  - Episode 1.05 "Ye Gods"
  - Episode 1.09 "Dead Woman's Shoes"
  - Episode 1.14 "Still Life"
  - Episode 1.18 "Personal Demons"
  - Episode 1.20 "Button, Button"
  - Episode 1.23 "Grace Note"
  - Episode 2.09 "Private Channel"
- The Men's Club (1986)
- The Metamorphosis, a Study: Nabokov on Kafka (1989)
- The Krays (1990)
- Let Him Have It (1991)
- Romeo Is Bleeding (1993)
- Pontiac Moon (1994)
- The Hunchback (1997)
- Species II (1998)
- David Copperfield (2000)
- The Feast of All Saints (2001) (TV mini-series)
- The Wire (2002)
  - Episode 1.03 "The Buys"
- Carnivàle (2003)
  - Episode 1.04 "Black Blizzard"
- House (2004)
  - Episodes 1.6 "The Socratic Method"
- Masters of Horror (2007)
  - Episode "The Washingtonians"
- Sex and Lies in Sin City (2008)
- Breaking Bad (2009)
  - Episode 2.06 "Peekaboo"
- Hannibal (2013)
  - Episode 1.04 "Œuf"
  - Episode 2.03 "Hassun"
- Dating Game Killer (2017)
- The Ghost of Peter Sellers (2018)
