= Thomas Grier =

British flying ace of WWII

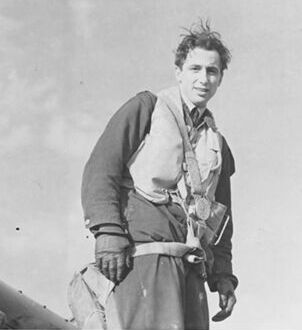
- Grier exiting his Hawker Hurricane fighter at Exeter, November 1940
- Born: 1918; Glasgow, Scotland
- Died: 5 December 1941 (aged 23); English Channel
- Military career
- Allegiance: United Kingdom
- Branch: Royal Air Force
- Service years: 1938–1941 †
- Rank: Squadron Leader
- Unit: No. 601 Squadron
- Commands: No. 32 Squadron
- Conflicts: Second World War: Battle of Britain; Circus offensive
- Awards: Distinguished Flying Cross

Thomas Grier DFC (1918 – 5 December 1941) was a British flying ace of the Royal Air Force (RAF) during the Second World War. He is credited with the destruction of at least twelve aircraft.

Born in Glasgow, Grier joined the RAF in mid-1938 and was undergoing flying training at the outbreak of the Second World War. He was posted to No. 601 Squadron in June 1940 and flew Hawker Hurricane fighters extensively during the Battle of Britain. Destroying a number of German aircraft during the campaign over southeast England, he was awarded the Distinguished Flying Cross. He was given command of No. 32 Squadron in October 1941 and was killed two months later, aged 23, while on a sortie to German-occupied France.

== Early life ==
Thomas Grier was born in 1918 at Glasgow in Scotland to a former British Army soldier and his wife. He attended Dunoon Grammar School before going on to Allan Glen's School. Later living in Stow-on-the-Wold in Gloucestershire, England, in May 1938, he applied to join the Royal Air Force (RAF) on a short service commission and was accepted for training. He was confirmed in the rank of pilot officer in May 1939.

== Second World War ==
With the Second World War having commenced the previous year, Grier commenced training on the Hawker Hurricane fighter at No. 6 Operational Training Unit at Sutton Bridge in May 1940. The following month, he was posted to No. 601 Squadron. Recovering from its involvement in the Battle of France, this was based at Tangmere. Equipped with Hurricanes, it was engaged in convoy patrols along the English Channel and became drawn into the Battle of Britain as the Luftwaffe commenced its campaign against British shipping traversing these waters.

=== Battle of Britain ===
Grier shared in the destruction of a Dornier Do 17 medium bomber to the west of Cherbourg on 7 July. He shared in the destruction of a Junkers Ju 88 medium bomber near the Isle of Wight on 16 July and four days later assisted in the shooting down of a Heinkel He 59 floatplane to the south of Selsey Bill. On 13 August, he probably destroyed a Ju 88 and shared in the probable destruction of a second, both in the vicinity of Arundel. On subsequent scrambles the same day, he destroyed a Messerschmitt Bf 110 heavy fighter over Portland and a second near Winchester.

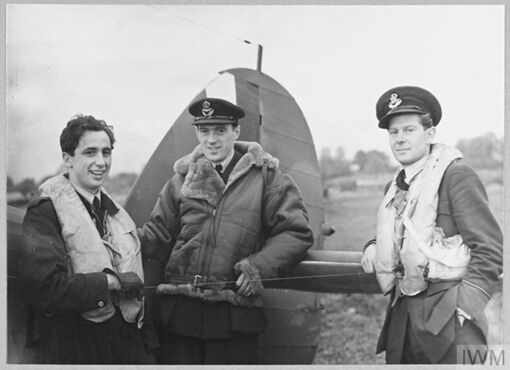
Grier stands on the left, next to the commander of No. 601 Squadron, Squadron Leader Sir Archibald Hope (centre), and Flight Lieutenant William Clyde (right)

On 18 August, now known as The Hardest Day, Grier destroyed a pair of Junkers Ju 87 dive bombers to the south of Selsey Bill. No. 601 Squadron was shifted to Debden, supposedly for a rest from operations but as the Luftwaffe increased its range of operations deeper inland, the pilots of the squadron were still called upon for interceptions. Grier shared in the shooting down of a Heinkel He 111 medium bomber to the north of North Weald on 30 August and the next day, destroyed a Bf 110 near Colchester. Flying over Maidstone on 6 September, he engaged and destroyed two Messerschmitt Bf 109 fighters. By this time he was a flying officer, having been promoted to this rank a few days prior. On 25 September he shot down a Ju 88 20 miles (32 km) to the south of Plymouth. His successes over the preceding months were recognised with an award of the Distinguished Flying Cross in October. The citation, published in The London Gazette, read:

This officer has taken part in a considerable number of engagements against the enemy and has destroyed eight of their aircraft as well as sharing in the destruction of others. He has displayed great courage, keenness and devotion to duty.

— London Gazette, No. 34958, 1 October 1940

By this time, No. 601 Squadron was based at Exeter, covering the West Country, and its pace of operations were much reduced. It was largely inactive for the next several months but on 9 October Grier damaged a He 111 over Dartmouth. From early 1941 it began to fly on fighter sweeps to German-occupied France as part of the RAF's Circus offensive.

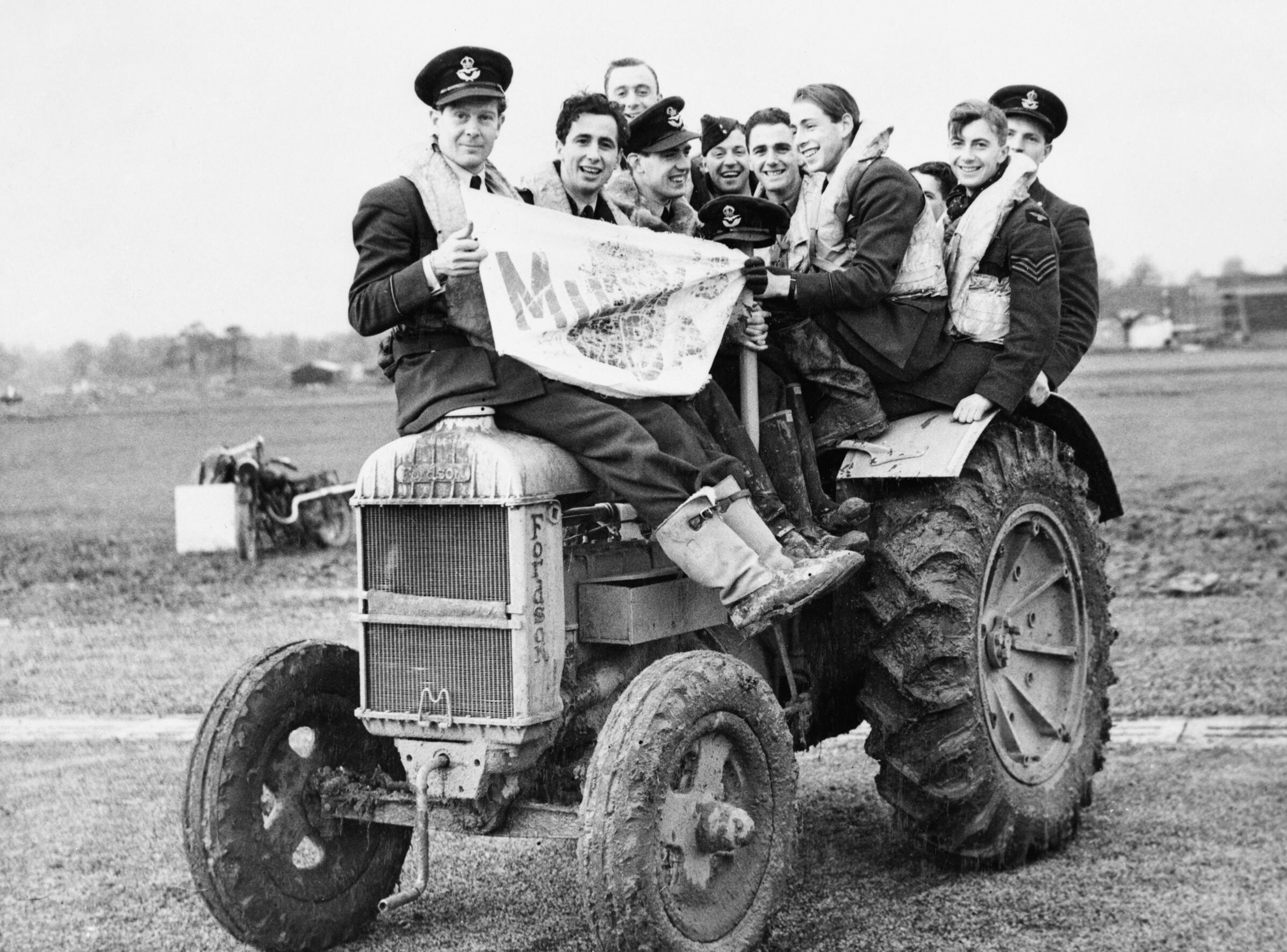
A group of No. 601 Squadron pilots at Exeter, November 1940; Grier is second left

=== Squadron command ===
Grier's substantive rank was made up to flight lieutenant in September and the next month he was promoted to acting squadron leader and given command of No. 32 Squadron. His new unit was based at Angle in the West Country and mostly engaged in convoy patrols along the coast. It moved to Manston in November and, using its upgraded Hurricane Mk IIbs, was switched to offensive missions. On one of these, carried out on 5 December, Grier was shot down and killed off Le Havre.

Grier was survived by his wife, Sybil who he married in July 1940, and is commemorated on the Runneymeade Memorial at Englefield Green. He is credited with having destroyed twelve aircraft, four being shared with other pilots. He is also believed to have probably destroyed two more aircraft, one shared, and damaged one other.
