= William P. Clyde =

American businessman

William Clyde
- Born: William Pancoast Clyde; October 11, 1839; Claymont, Delaware, U.S.
- Died: November 18, 1923 (aged 84); Manhattan, New York, U.S.
- Resting place: Laurel Hill Cemetery, Philadelphia, Pennsylvania, U.S.
- Occupation: Shipping magnate
- Known for: Owner/President: Clyde Steamship Company; Robins Dry Dock and Repair Co. Morris-Dale Coal Co. Interstate Coal & Land Co.
- Spouse: Emeline Field Hill (1841–1931)
- Children: Marshall H., Thomas C., William P. Jr., George W. Mabel, Ethel
- Parent(s): Thomas Clyde; Rebecca Pancoast
- Relatives: William Clyde (grandson); Jeremy Clyde (great-grandson)

William Pancoast Clyde (October 11, 1839 – November 18, 1923) was an American businessman who was the owner and president of the Clyde Steamship Company, a steamship and canal boat mercantile and passenger transportation business founded by his father Thomas Clyde in 1844.

== Early life and education ==
Clyde was born on October 11, 1839, in Claymont, Delaware. He attended Trinity College in Hartford, Connecticut, but after the outbreak of the American Civil War, he left his studies to join the Union Army as part of the Philadelphia Grey Reserves. He eventually graduated from Trinity College in 1862 with a Masters of Arts degree.

== Career ==
He took over control of his father's shipping business in 1861. In 1865 he became president of the Pacific Mail Steamship Company and dominated American shipping on the Pacific coast as well as transportation on the Panama Canal Railway in Central America. He was active in the development of railroad in the southern United States and was the owner of the Richmond and Danville Railroad.

In 1878, Clyde established the West India Line to Caribbean ports. By 1882 he had shipping routes along the west coast of Florida, to New Orleans, down to Key West and Havana. William Clyde verticalized the shipping operations to include their own drydock company and coal mining operations which supplied the fuel for their vessels.

In 1888, when civil war in Haiti broke out, Clyde sold weapons to Florvil Hyppolite under the protection of Rear Admiral Bancroft Gherardi, the commander of the U.S. North Atlantic Squadron. The election of President Benjamin Harrison gave Clyde additional influence over shipping routes to the Caribbean. Benjamin Franklin Tracy, the legal counsel for Clyde, became the Secretary of the Navy which allowed Clyde to influence Harrison's decisions about the Caribbean.

The Haitian civil war ended with Hyppolite as president of Haiti. President Harrison appointed Frederick Douglass as minister resident and consult general to Haiti. Clyde was to receive a Clyde Line shipping contract to Haiti as a reward for supporting Hyppolite during the civil war. Douglass supported the shipping contract but was offended by the pressure he received to support the interests of one industrialist. Clyde tried to have him removed from the post because Douglass refused to renounce all other American interests in Haiti if the Clyde contract was not granted. U.S. government officials tried to use the Clyde contract to allow the U.S. to build a naval base at the Haitian deep water port of Môle-Saint-Nicolas but the deal failed in part due to the strict terms set by Clyde. Douglass quit his post in 1891 and published his side of the story about why negotiations for a U.S. naval base in Haiti failed.

In 1890, Clyde purchased 9,000 acres on Hilton Head Island, South Carolina, for use as a private hunting preserve.

By 1899 the company had lines from New York to Wilmington, Brunswick, New York to Philadelphia, Philadelphia to Norfolk, New York to the West Indies, from Boston, Providence, and New York to Jacksonville, Florida as well as a St. John River Line. The steamships connected to rail lines in Florida. The company was sold to Charles W. Morse in 1906.

He was a charter member of the Society of Naval Architects and Marine Engineers.

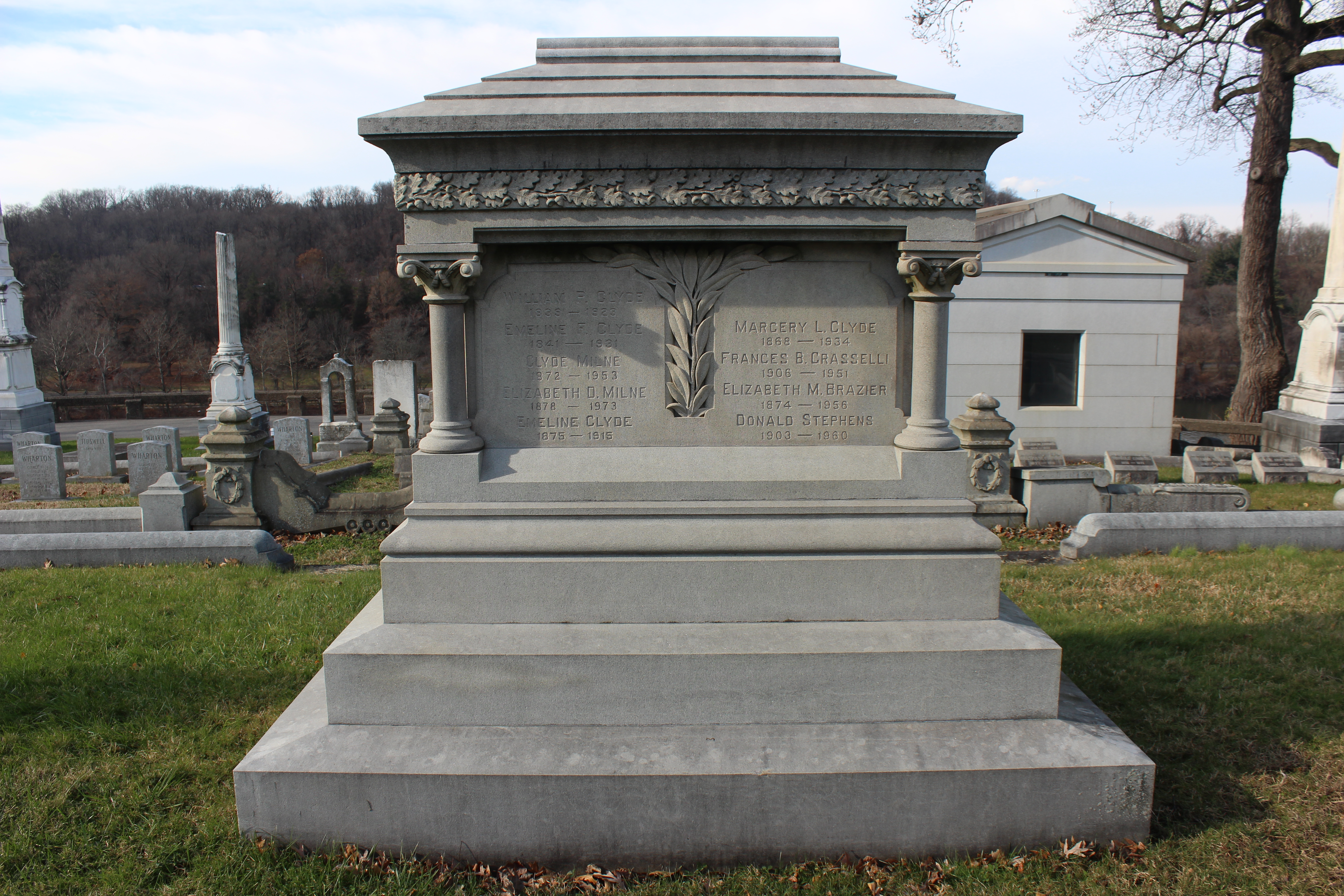
William Pancoast Clyde tombstone in Laurel Hill Cemetery, Philadelphia

He died on November 18, 1923, and was interred at Laurel Hill Cemetery in Philadelphia.
