= Ghost in the Noonday Sun =

1974 British film by Peter Medak

- Directed by: Peter Medak
- Written by: Evan Jones; Spike Milligan
- Based on: novel by Sid Fleischman
- Produced by: Thomas Clyde; Gareth Wigan
- Starring: Peter Sellers; Spike Milligan
- Cinematography: Michael Reed; Larry Pizer
- Edited by: Ray Lovejoy
- Music by: Denis King
- Distributed by: Tyburn Entertainment (UK); Columbia Pictures (USA)
- Release date: 1985 (home video)
- Running time: 93 minutes
- Country: United Kingdom
- Language: English
- Budget: $2 million

Ghost in the Noonday Sun is a 1974 British comedy film directed by Peter Medak starring Peter Sellers, Anthony Franciosa and Spike Milligan. The film suffered a difficult production due to Sellers's erratic behavior and was not theatrically released. Medak described the film as "the biggest disaster of my life" in 2016.

The script was written by Evan Jones and Ernest Tidyman (uncredited) with additional dialogue by Milligan. The film was produced by Thomas Clyde and Gareth Wigan with cinematography by Michael Reed and Larry Pizer. The title and some of the plot details are based on the book of the same title by Newbery Medal-winning children's author Sid Fleischman.

== Plot ==
In the seventeenth century, pirate captain Ras Mohammed, accompanied by his incompetent Irish cook Dick Scratcher and three crewmen, buries three chests of treasure on an unnamed island. Scratcher then kills the captain and three crewmen. He returns to the pirate ship and proclaims himself the new captain, as only he knows the location of the treasure. He soon discovers his predecessor's treasure map was drawn in disappearing ink. Fourteen years later, the pirate ship reaches Ireland, although Scratcher believes they are on a Greek island. The crew behaves gluttonously, with the exception of the debonair and cerebral Pierre Rodriquez.

They abduct an Irish boy, Jeremiah, whom Scratcher believes can see ghosts and will therefore be able to contact Ras Mohammed's ghost for directions to the treasure. After seeing off the British Navy by posing as Portuguese fishermen suffering the "red plague", the pirates sail to Algiers, where Jeremiah is taken prisoner. The pirates encounter Scratcher's old friend Billy Bombay and later release Jeremiah.

After threats of mutiny by a pirate named Abdullah, the pirates end up back at the island of buried treasure. They dig up Billy Bombay's treasure chest of silver cannonballs and fire them at Billy Bombay and his six brothers, leaving only Billy alive. Separately, Pierre, Jeremiah and Abdullah discover Ras Mohammed's treasure. The film ends with Scratcher buried up to his neck in sand, while Billy Bombay is tied to a tree, and the two shout insults at each other.

== Style ==
The film's opening seven-minute prologue is shot in the style of a black and white silent film, complete with caption cards.

Sellers' onetime Goon Show colleague Spike Milligan appears halfway through the film and worked on revisions to the script. This results in some Goonish style banter and effects, such as undercranked film sequences making movement seem faster, dialogue and sound effects. When Scratcher and Billy Bombay meet, Milligan says to camera, "It's that smelly old sea-goon, Dick Scratcher" – an apparent reference to The Goon Show character Ned Seagoon.

== Cast ==
- Peter Sellers as Dick Scratcher
- Anthony Franciosa as Pierre Rodriguez
- Spike Milligan as Bill Bombay
- Clive Revill as Bey of Algiers
- Peter Boyle as Ras Mohammed
- Richard Willis as Jeremiah
- James Villiers as Parsely-Frack
- Rosemary Leach as Kate
- Thomas Baptiste as Abdullah
- Murray Melvin as Hamldon
- Bill Kerr as Giacomo

== Production ==
=== Development ===
The novel Ghost in the Noonday Sun was published in 1965. The New York Times called it a "rollicking tale". The Los Angeles Times called it "a rousing tale."

Sellers persuaded Medak, a friend of his, to make the film. "He was an incredible guy," said Medak of Sellers. "His invention would go into supersonic flight. You couldn't stop him. He had classical comedy genius." Wolf Mankowitz wrote the first draft but it was later estimated a dozen writers worked on the script. According to Sellers "It started life as a straight pirate yarn. But we got to work on it and turned it into a crazy comedy. You could call it "Goons at Sea". I think it's what people want." The film was the second movie financed by Somerville House, a Montreal based investment company who were interested in getting into the film industry.

=== Shooting ===
The film was shot in and off the coast of Kyrenia, Cyprus, and at Bray International Studios near Maidenhead, England. "Everything started going wrong days before shooting began," said Medak. "The Greek captain delivering the pirate ship to Kyrenia's magnificent seventh century harbour was so drunk that he crashed the ship into the quay instead of the narrow strip of water."

Peter Sellers arrived on location displaying strange behaviour, attributed to the end of his relationship with Liza Minnelli. Shortly after filming began, Sellers began to lose confidence in the project and when Spike Milligan arrived to shoot his scenes, Sellers asked him to assess the footage that had been shot thus far. Milligan looked at the rushes and said "this is on a disaster course". He outlined his ideas to Medak and Sellers, who approved. Milligan rewrote the script, but Sellers did not turn up for the first day of filming the new scenes, claiming he was too ill to work. He decided a vase in his Swiss home might be facing the wrong way so he sent his secretary to Gstaad to take the vase back to London. Once this was done, Sellers agreed to resume shooting. Medak shot film around Sellers. He liked Milligan's script changes and wanted Milligan to film during the day and rewrite at night. Milligan was reluctant so Sellers tried to get production shut down. Medak refused.

Sellers subsequently became deliberately uncooperative and would often pretend to be sick. On one occasion he was rushed to hospital with a suspected heart attack, only for Medak to spot newspaper photographs of Sellers dining with Princess Margaret in London two days later. Sellers caused further upset by agreeing to shoot a cigarette commercial during one of the few off-days in the filming schedule, drafting in an unwilling Peter Medak to direct it, and then on the day refusing to be filmed holding the cigarette packet because he claimed to be the chairman of the Anti-Smoking League. Sellers had personally invited British cinematographer Larry Pizer to shoot the film, only to later fire him after a party once production had commenced. Sellers also fought on set with co-star Tony Franciosa, at one point refusing to appear in the same shot as Franciosa. "It's all kind of bewildering," said Franciosa during filming. "Half the time I'm not actually sure what anyone's trying to do. Some of this comedy is so way out I couldn't begin to describe it. But I'll say this: it's an experience."

"As an artist, he was a genius," said Medak of Sellers. "As a person, he was insane. He was depressed in real life, like the typical comedian who under the surface is suicidal... He was incredibly manipulative. He created situations where there was tremendous confusion and then he'd gain the upper hand. He destroyed the whole film... On a good day he was sensational but his moods changed. He couldn't remember what he'd said to you days before. But I remember, working with him, there were moments when it was heaven. We laughed so hard the tears rolled down our cheeks." After the final scene was filmed, involving Sellers and Milligan both being physically restrained, the crew forced them to listen to a song detailing the production's woes.

== Release ==
Medak says after he attended a private screening with Sellers and Milligan: “We all just wanted to kill ourselves.” The film was shot in 1973 and has a copyright notice in the opening credits for 1974. Columbia Pictures deemed the film not worthy of cinematic release. "Even Peter Sellers was bad in it," said Fleischman later.

According to Medak, Sellers wanted to buy back the film from Columbia, and for the director and Milligan to redo the narration and re-edit the film for Sellers to get it released. But then Sellers called and said, "I can’t buy back the film because it’s been written up for twice as much as it cost." It was ultimately released on Betamax and VHS home video in 1985, and on DVD in 2016.

== Reception ==
Variety wrote: "Ghost In The Noonday Sun arrives as a genuine surprise release (albeit on pay TV) not because of its quality but rather because of its very existence. The 1973 production which stars Peter Sellers had been believed by many key artistic contributors to be incomplete and unfinishable. However, perhaps because of pay's hunger for product, it now surfaces as an unpretentious comedy of modest merits unlikely to stir cries of revival or mainstream playoff. ...The original script by Evan Jones appears to be quite thin on tension and one imagines both Sellers and Spike Milligan (credited with additional dialog), as a rival bumbling pirate chief, camping and padding the antics during filming. Their efforts produce lengthy and tedious slapstick tracts. ...Filmed in Cyprus, the location work is quite handsome and remaining technical credits outshine the artistic components of the picture. Acting is largely uninspired and frantic with the story finally running out of steam rather than reaching a satisfying conclusion."

== The Ghost of Peter Sellers ==
In 2016, it was announced that Peter Medak was directing a feature-length documentary about the ill-fated production, called The Ghost of Peter Sellers. The film originated with Paul Iacovou, managing director of Vegas Media in Cyprus, who got Medak involved. It was released in 2018 after some production delays.

The documentary formed the basis for an audio comedy drama by Bob Sinfield titled Peter Sellers at Sea, which was broadcast on BBC Radio 4 Extra in September 2025. Kerry Shale played Medak and Jack Klaff played Sellers.
