= Follow That Horse! =

1960 British film by Alan Bromly

- British quad poster
- Directed by: Alan Bromly
- Screenplay by: Alfred Shaughnessy; William Douglas-Home (additional scenes); Howard Mason (adapted by)
- Based on: the novel Photo Finish by Howard Mason
- Produced by: Thomas Clyde
- Starring: David Tomlinson; Cecil Parker; Richard Wattis; Dora Bryan; Mary Peach
- Cinematography: Norman Warwick
- Edited by: Gerald Turney-Smith
- Music by: Stanley Black
- Production companies: Associated British Picture Corporation; Cavalcade Pictures
- Distributed by: Warner-Pathé Distributors (U.K.)
- Release date: 11 July 1960; (London) (U.K.)
- Running time: 80 minutes
- Country: United Kingdom
- Language: English

Follow That Horse! is a 1960 British comedy film directed by Alan Bromly and starring David Tomlinson, Cecil Parker, Richard Wattis, Mary Peach and Dora Bryan. The screenplay was by Alfred Shaughnessy and William Douglas-Home based on the 1954 novel Photo Finish by Howard Mason.

== Plot ==
Various parties including scientists and spies chase after a horse that has eaten a roll of microfilm.

== Cast ==
- David Tomlinson as Dick Lanchester
- Cecil Parker as Sir William Crane
- Richard Wattis as Hugh Porlock
- Mary Peach as Susan Turner
- Dora Bryan as Miss Bradstock
- Raymond Huntley as Special Branch Chief
- Sam Kydd as Farrell
- George Pravda as Hammler
- John Welsh as Major Turner
- Peter Copley as Garrod
- Cyril Shaps as Dr. Spiegel
- Victor Brooks as Blake
- Vic Wise as Riley
- George A. Cooper as Rudd
- Arthur Lowe as auctioneer

== Critical reception ==
The Monthly Film Bulletin wrote: "A standard, old-fashioned British farce is coaxed along by the subtly timed performances of David Tomlinson, Cecil Parker and Richard Wattis. Briskness and gusto stiffen much that is limp in the situations and offset the undistinguished humour, but only just."

Kine Weekly wrote: "The picture lacks the astringent wit of recent comedies that have cashed in by ridiculing Establishments, but nevertheless has its amusing moments. ... The scenes in Whitehall and Cherwell's laboratories contain some bright satire, but the intestinal humour, arising from the fight against time for the possession of the horse before nature does her work, creates the loudest chuckles."

In British Sound Films: The Studio Years 1928–1959 David Quinlan rated the film as "average", writing: "Vigorous playing by cast of scene-stealers just get antiquated farce by. "

TV Guide gave the film two out of four stars, calling it "Harmlessly silly."
