= Mary Peach =

South African-born British actress (1934–2025)

- Born: 20 October 1934; Durban, South Africa
- Died: 26 January 2025 (aged 90)
- Occupation: Actress
- Years active: 1957–1995
- Spouses: Thomas Clyde (m. 1961, divorced); Jimmy Sangster (m. 1995; died 2011)

Mary E. Peach (20 October 1934 – 26 January 2025) was a South African-born British film and television actress.

== Early life and career ==
Mary E. Peach was born in Durban on 20 October 1934, to Cyrial and May Peach. After being nominated for a BAFTA Award as most promising newcomer for the 1959 film Room at the Top, she went on to appear on many British films and television series over the next 25 years. She starred opposite Rock Hudson in the film A Gathering of Eagles and in 1970 she appeared in the film Scrooge, a musical version of Dickens' A Christmas Carol starring Albert Finney.

Peach appeared as a regular in the television series Couples, Inside Story, the 1966 BBC adaptation of The Three Musketeers, Fox and the Doctor Who serial The Enemy of the World. Amongst her other television appearances she played Colonel Tanya Smolenko, a Russian counter espionage agent in The Saint episode "The Gadget Lovers" (1967) and starred opposite Ian McShane in Disraeli (1978).

When Diana Rigg left The Avengers in 1968, she was one of the actresses considered for the role of Steed's new assistant. She also played Mae (Sister Woman) in the BBC production of Tennessee Williams' Cat on a Hot Tin Roof with Natalie Wood as Maggie, Robert Wagner as Brick, Sir Laurence Olivier as Big Daddy, and Maureen Stapleton as Big Mama.

== Personal life and death ==
Peach married film producer Thomas Clyde on 18 May 1961 at the Chelsea Register Office in London. They met on the set of the 1960 film Follow That Horse!, which Clyde produced. The couple separated in the 1980s and later divorced. She later married to the screenwriter and director Jimmy Sangster from 1995 until his death in 2011.

Peach died on 26 January 2025, at the age of 90.

== Filmography ==
=== Film ===
Year	Title	Role	Notes
1959	Room at the Top	June Samson	
1959	The Lady Is a Square	Mrs. Freddy	
1960	Follow That Horse!	Susan Turner	
1961	No Love for Johnnie	Pauline West	
1962	A Pair of Briefs	Frances Pilbright	
1963	A Gathering of Eagles	Victoria Caldwell	
1965	Ballad in Blue	Peggy Harrison	
1966	The Projected Man	Dr. Patricia Hill	
1970	Scrooge	Harry's wife	
1988	Grandmother's House	Fay	
1992	Mothers and Daughters	Fay	
1995	Cutthroat Island	Lady	

=== Television ===
Year	Title	Role	Notes
1957	Esmé Divided	Gladys Pilcher	TV film
1957	Armchair Theatre	Lady Jane Graham	"The Human Touch"
1958	Armchair Theatre	Hilda Wangel / Asta	"The Master Builder", "The Rat Wife"
1960	Inside Story	Kathy Webb	TV series
1961	Alcoa Presents: One Step Beyond	Jill Barrington	"Nightmare"
1963	ITV Television Playhouse	Jean Fowler	"The Outcasts"
1966–67	The Three Musketeers	Milady de Winter	TV series
1967	The Saint	Smolenko	"The Gadget Lovers"
1967	ITV Play of the Week	Helene Bang	"One Fat Englishman"
1967	Theatre 625	Jane Dee	"The Magicians: Dr. Dee, Kelly and the Spirits"
1967–68	Doctor Who	Astrid Ferrier	Serial: The Enemy of the World
1969	W. Somerset Maugham	Violet Saffary	"The Back of Beyond"
1971	Hadleigh	Mrs. Billingham	"Invasion"
1971	The Ten Commandments	Hilda	"Hilda"
1971	ITV Sunday Night Theatre	Pat	"The Birthday Run"
1972	ITV Sunday Night Theatre	Angie / Angela	"A Marriage", "When the Music Stops"
1972	Love Story	Hannah	"A Memory of Two Loves"
1973	Play for Today	Elizabeth	"Access to the Children"
1973	Menace	Diana	"Valentine"
1973	Fixation	Kay Hughes	TV film
1974	Dial M for Murder	Linda Grady	"Whatever's Peter Playing At?"
1975	Rooms	Alison Richards	"Alison: Parts 1 & 2"
1976	Couples	Tricia Roland	TV series
1976	Can You Keep a Secret	Janet Pierce	TV film
1976	Cat on a Hot Tin Roof	Mae	TV film
1977	ITV Playhouse	Helen Johnson	"Blind Love"
1978	Crown Court	Dr. Ruth Wilkins	"The Song Not the Singer: Part 1"
1978	Disraeli: Portrait of a Romantic	Mary Anne Lewis	"Dizzy", "Mary Anne", "The Great Game 1858-1872"
1980	Fox	Peg	Guest role
1982	The Gentle Touch	Paula Livesey	"Cause and Effect"
1983	The Aerodrome	Florence	TV film
1984	The Far Pavilions	Mrs. Harlowe	TV miniseries
1985	A.D.	Peasant	"Part 1"
