= Jonathan Martin (musician) =

Jonathan Martin (1715–37) was an English organist who lived and worked in London. He died 'of a consumption' aged just 22.

== Musical career ==
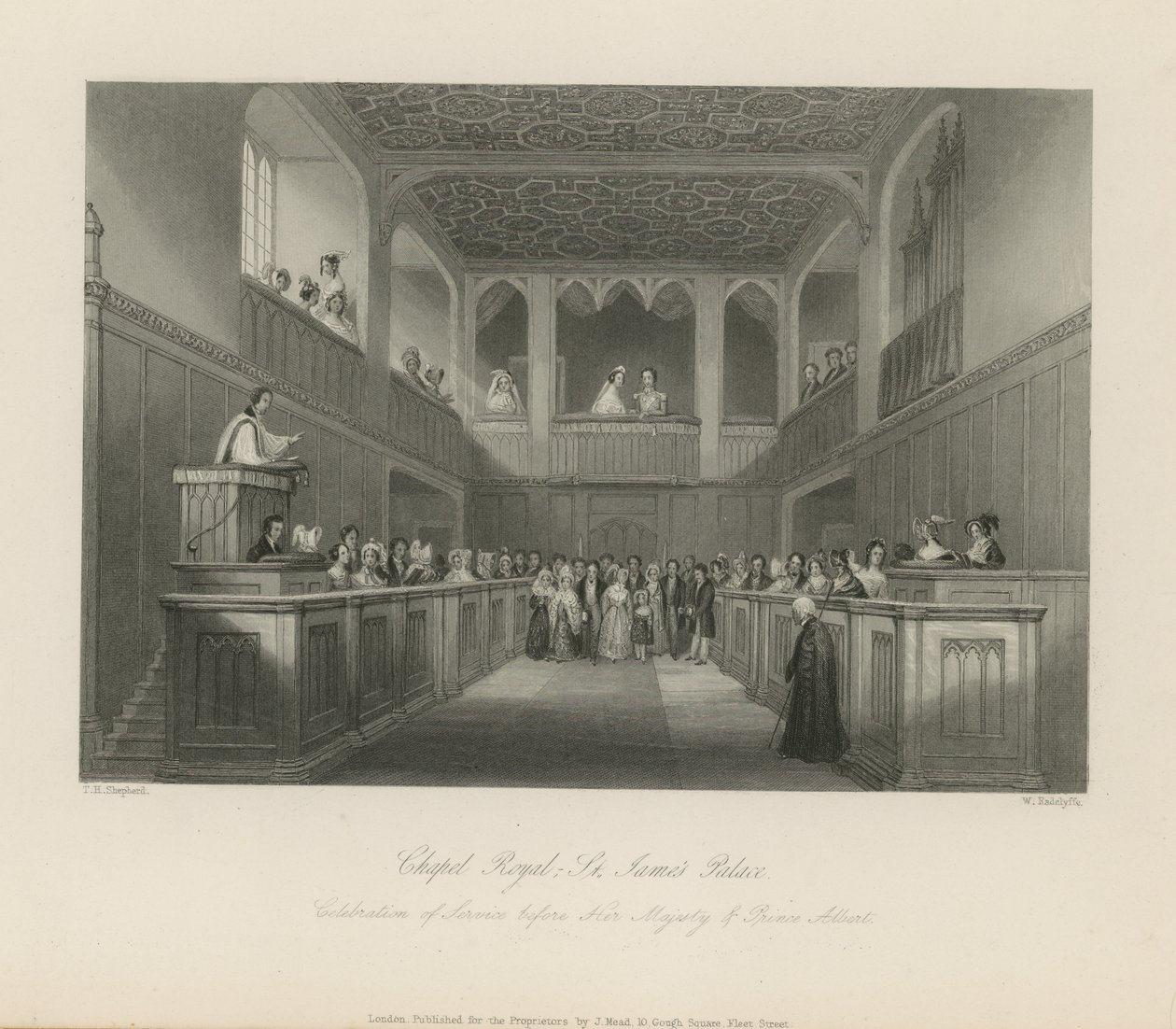
Interior of the chapel, St. James's Palace, mid-c19

Jonathan Martins was a chorister of the Chapel Royal under William Croft (1678–1727). He studied the organ under Thomas Roseingrave (1690/91–1766), frequently acting as deputy-organist for Roseingrave at St George's, Hanover Square. He also acted as deputy-organist of the Chapel Royal for John Weldon (1676–1736) who was both organist and composer there.

On 21 June 1736, following John Weldon's death, Jonathan Martin was made Chapel Royal organist, with Weldon's role as composer passing to Maurice Green (1696–1755). Martin was also organist to the Earl of Oxford at the Oxford Chapel, Vere Street, in London.

== Benefit concerts ==
Jonathan Martin had benefit concerts at Stationers Hall in London in May 1735 and April 1736. At the second concert he played two organ solos, but signs of ill health were apparent since it was noted that 'though he had scarcely strength to sit upright, he played two voluntaries on the organ, showing fine invention and masterly hand'.

== Death and Burial ==
Martin's death on 4 April 1737 was announced in the London press:

On Monday Morning died of a Consumption, in the 22d Year of his Age, Mr. Jonathan Martin, Organist to His Majesty, and to the Right Hon, the Earl of Oxford : young GenteMan as much esteemed for his aimiable Personal Qualities, as he was admired for his reat Excellene in his Profession.

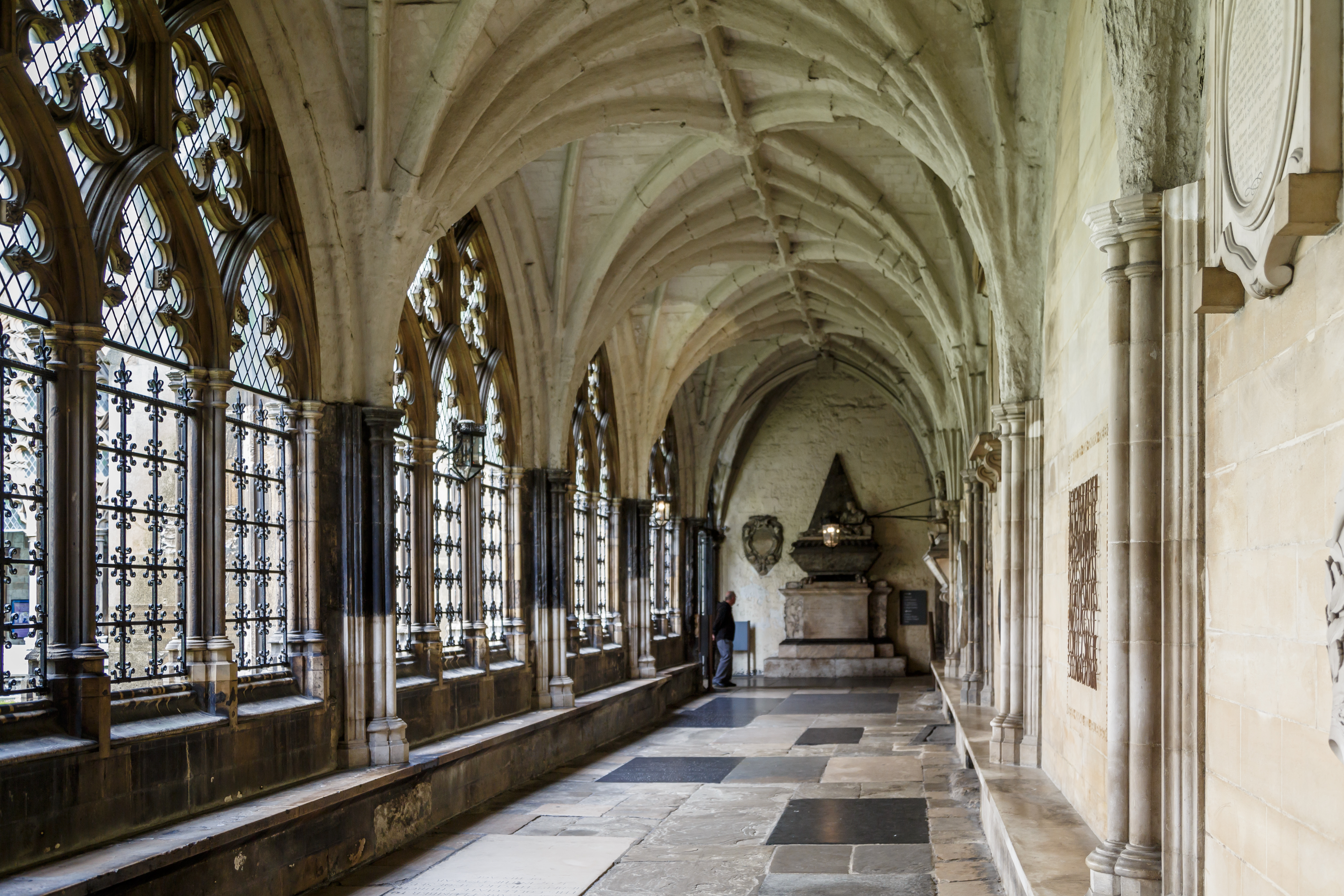
West Cloister, Westminster Abbey

He was buried in the west cloister of Westminster Abbey where – it was reported by The Daily Post newspaper – the inscription on his grave was to be composed by the poet Vincent Bourne (1695–1747), as follows:

Quarto Die Aprilis, A. D. MDCCXXVII / Ineunte Atatis anno viceflimo fecundo, / Obiit / JONATHAN MARTIN; / Mufices a puero feliciter dtudiofus, / Et, vix dum adultus, / Organifta in Regium Sacellum cooptatus : / Hoc Arti feilicet, hoc moribus, Hoc vita brevitati datum eft, / Ut Juvenis flarim excellerer, / Et fierer cito, quod diu non erat futurus.

However, there is no evidence that an engraved epitaph was ever installed in the cloister at Westminster Abbey. (The epitaph is also included in Bourne's collection of 'Miscellaneous Poems,' 1772.)

== Works ==
The only known composition by Martin is a setting of lyrics from the play 'Tamerlane' by Nicholas Rowe (1674–1718), entitled 'To thee, O gentle sleep'.
