= Thomas Clyde (businessman) =

American businessman

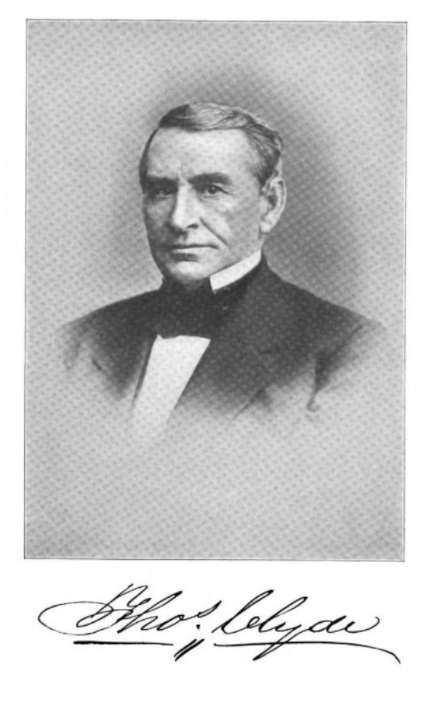
- Born: 1812; Ireland
- Died: January 12, 1885 (aged 72–73)
- Resting place: Laurel Hill Cemetery, Philadelphia, Pennsylvania, U.S.
- Occupation: Founder of the Clyde Steamship Company
- Spouse: Rebecca Pancoast
- Children: William Pancoast Clyde

Thomas Clyde (1812 – January 12, 1885) was a ship-owner, founder of the Clyde Steamship Company, and a civil and marine engineer who built the first commercial screw steamer in America.

He was born in Ireland and emigrated to the United States at the age of eight. He lived in Philadelphia with his uncle until they relocated to Chester, Pennsylvania in 1826. Clyde and Edward Darlington co-owned a spinning mill on Chester Creek in Pennsylvania and another mill on the Brandywine River in Delaware. He worked for his uncle's grocery business until 1832 and then took charge of a stone quarry on Ridley Creek. The quarry provided huge blocks of stone ranging between two and seven tons to the U.S. Government for the construction of the Delaware Breakwater near Cape Henlopen, Delaware. The stones were carried to Cape Henlopen by large sloops. He also worked as a contractor on the construction of the James River and Kanawha Canal in Virginia.

In 1842, he began a short-sea shipping business between Philadelphia and New York. The venture initially consisted of only one steamer but quickly grew to twelve steamers running between the two ports. The business expanded to include routes to Norfolk, Richmond, Alexandria, Washington, D.C. and other ports along the Atlantic Coast of the United States.

In 1844, Clyde partnered with Swedish inventor John Ericsson and Thomas Neafie (of Neafie & Levy) to apply Ericsson's screw-propeller technology to steam vessels. After several experimental versions, Clyde launched the twin-screw propeller steamer John S. McKim making it the first screw steamer built in the United States for commercial use.

Thomas Clyde ran the shipping company from 1844 until 1861. He was at one point in that period the largest owner of steamers and steamships in the United States. At one point he controlled all steamship traffic from New York to San Francisco as well as the traffic on the Panama Railroad. He served as a director in the Delaware Mutual Safety Insurance Company and the Central National Bank. He also had holdings in railroads and real estate.

His son William Pancoast Clyde took over the company and it expanded into the Clyde Steamship Company with additional steamships and routes in the last quarter of the 19th century and into the 20th. The company was sold to Charles W. Morse in 1906.

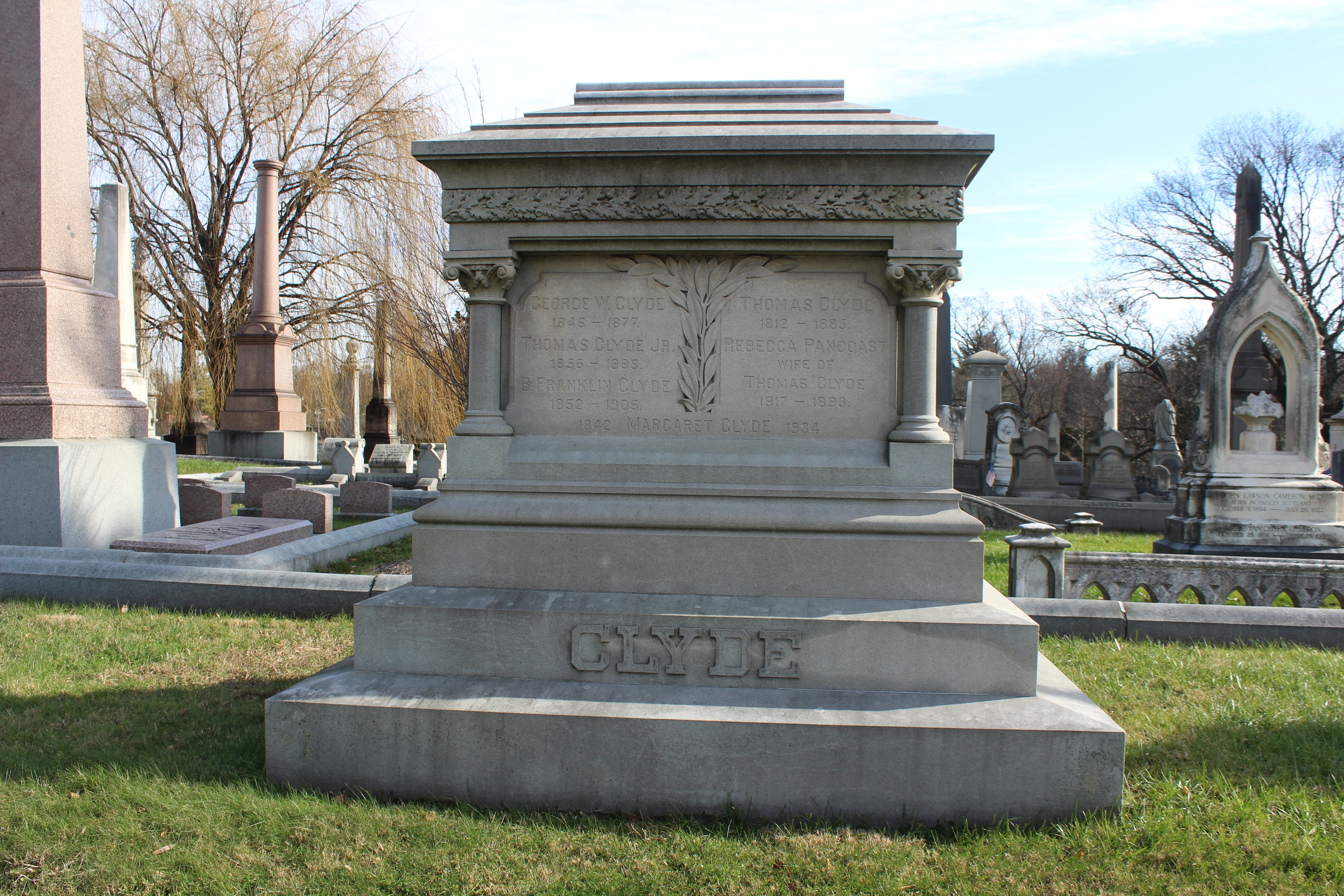
Thomas Clyde tombstone in Laurel Hill Cemetery, Philadelphia

He was married to Rebecca Pancoast. He died on January 12, 1885, and was interred at Laurel Hill Cemetery in Philadelphia.
