= St Peter, Vere Street =

Coordinates: 51.5154°N 0.1474°W

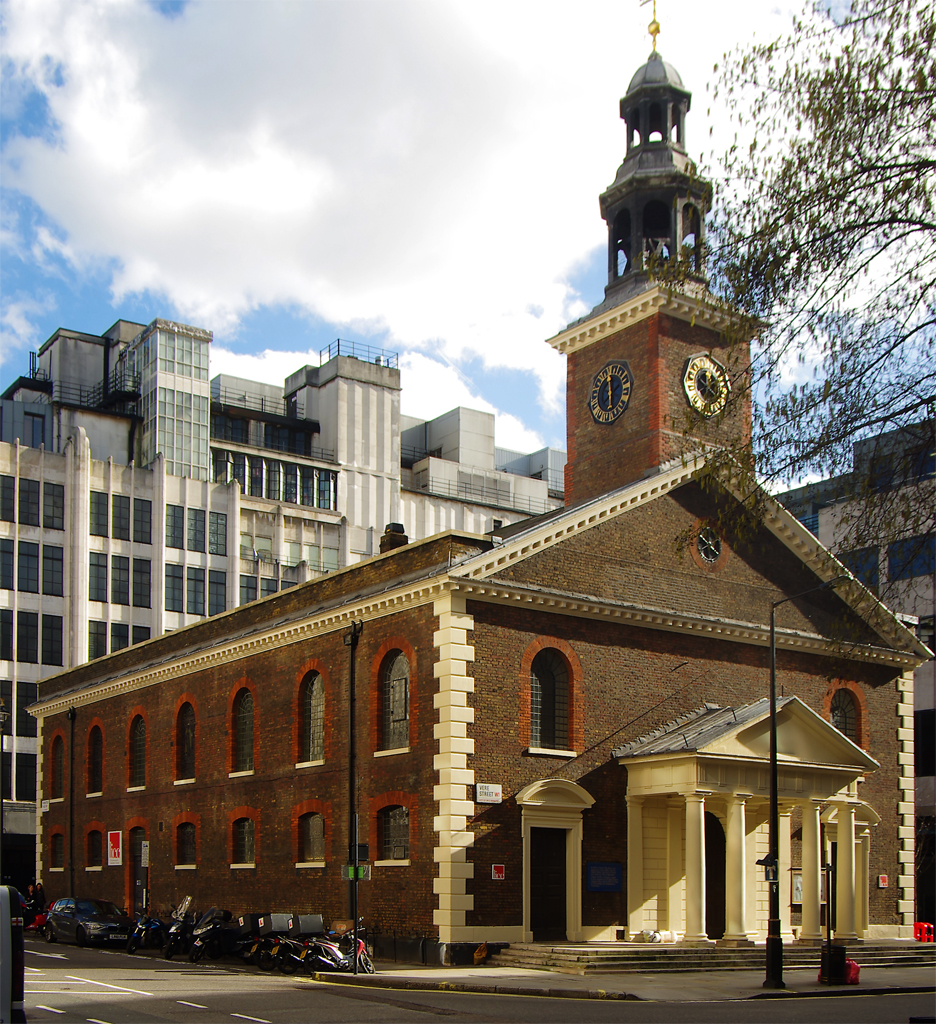
- St Peter, Vere Street
- Location: Oxford Street, London
- Country: England
- Previous denomination: Church of England

History
- Founder: Edward Harley, 2nd Earl of Oxford and Earl Mortimer

Architecture
- Architect: James Gibbs
- Years built: 1722

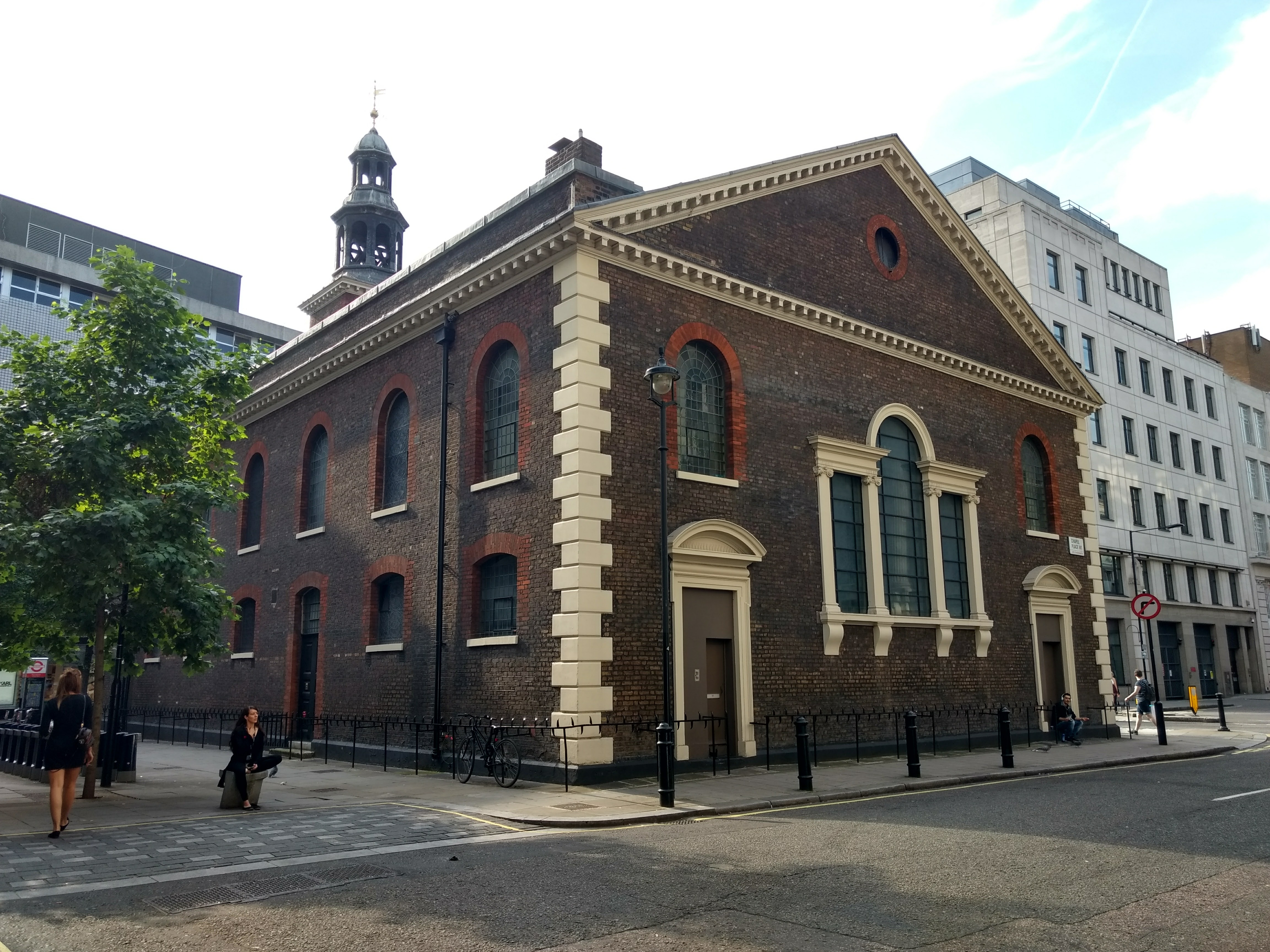
St Peter, Vere Street from Chapel Place

St Peter, Vere Street, known until 1832 as the Oxford Chapel after its founder Edward Harley, 2nd Earl of Oxford and Earl Mortimer, is a former Anglican church off Oxford Street, London. It has sometimes been referred to as the Marybone Chapel or Marylebone Chapel.

== History ==
The chapel was designed by James Gibbs in 1722. It was originally intended as a Chapel of Ease to supplement the parish church for the growing parish of Marylebone.

The building was acquired by the Crown from the Portland Estate in 1817 and was dedicated to St Peter in 1832. In 1830, Parliament had passed an "Act for endowing the Parish Church of Newborough in the County of Northampton, and Three Chapels, called Portland Chapel, Oxford Chapel, and Welbeck Chapel, situate in the Parish of Saint Mary-le-bone, in the County of Middlesex, and also a Chapel erected on Sunk Island in the River Humber".

It was licensed for marriages from 1722 to 1754 and between 1930 and its deconsecration: Margaret Bentinck (daughter of the 2nd Earl, and Duchess of Portland) married here. Incumbents included the theologian F. D. Maurice (1860–69), and William Boyce was the chapel's organist from 1734 to 1736. Its interior appears in plate 2 of Hogarth's print series Industry and Idleness. It was also here that the French chef Jassintour Rozea married his French wife Mary Magdalen Bernard 01.April 1744. They lived on Duke Street close to Grosvenor Square. He became Master Chef to the Duke of Somerset, Charles Seymour, presenting sumptuous banquets for his guests. He wrote several cookery books on gourmet French cooking in the 1750s.

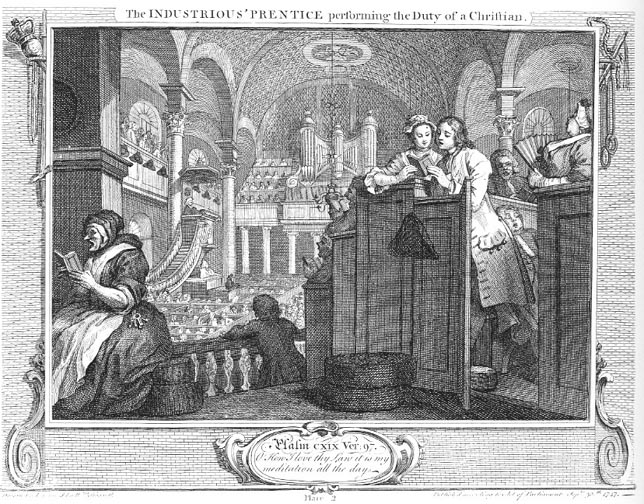
Plate 2 of William Hogarth's Industry and Idleness, showing the interior of the chapel

St Peter's served the congregation of All Souls Church, Langham Place, from 1940 to 1951 whilst the latter was having war damage repaired, and then became a chapel of ease to it.

While All Souls was again closed for building work between May 1975 and November 1976, its services were once more transferred to St Peter's. From 1982-3 onwards, the building was adapted for use as office space for the London Institute of Contemporary Christianity. The organisation moved to new premises in December 2025.

== Architecture ==
The church is built of brick, with stone quoins. The main entrance is at the west end, with steps leading up to a Doric porch. The pediment once held a carved coat of arms of a member of the De Vere family; this was removed in 1832, when the building was renovated and named St Peter's. A tower rises from the ridge of the roof at the west end; the first stage is square, and of brick, while the second two stages are octagonal, and pierced on each side. At the east end is a Venetian window, with a pediment above. There was originally a stone vase on each corner of the building.

The interior looking east

Inside, the nave has an elliptical nave vault supported on Corinthian columns, flanked by cross-vaulted aisles. There are galleries in both nave and chancel. Victorian alterations included the installation of stained-glass windows by Edward Burne-Jones, made by Morris & Co., which remain in place.

Detail of the stained glass

Gibbs published plans of the building in his Book Of Architecture, in which it is called 'Marybone Chapel'. Its ground plan was copied at St Paul's Church, Halifax, Nova Scotia, the earliest Anglican church in Canada, and the Holy Ghost plaque in the ceiling at St Thomas' Church, Stourbridge, is a close copy of that here.

== Organists ==
- after 1923 the organist post was held by the organist of All Souls Church, Langham Place.
- 1891–1923: Augustus Toop (?-?)
- in 1881: Capt. C. H. Hullett (?–?)
- in 1874: Walter Hermitage (?-?)
- 1866–1871: Edward Francis Rimbault (1816–76)
- 1860?–1866: Walter Bache (1842–88)
- (?-1860?): George French Flowers (1811–72).
  - He became a Catholic around 1860 and so this may date his successor's appointment.
- 1844-?: Kate Loder (1825–1904)
- : ?
- in 1773: Charles Burney (1726–1814)
- in 1764: Theodre Aylward (1730–1801)
- : ?
- (n.d.): Jonathan Martin (1715–37)
- in 1734: William Boyce (1711–79)
- in 1725: Joseph Centilivre
