= Clyde Steamship Company =

Steamship transportation company

- House flag
- Founded: 1874
- Founder: William P. Clyde
- Defunct: 1932
- Fate: Merged with Mallory Steamship Company
- Successor: Clyde-Mallory Line

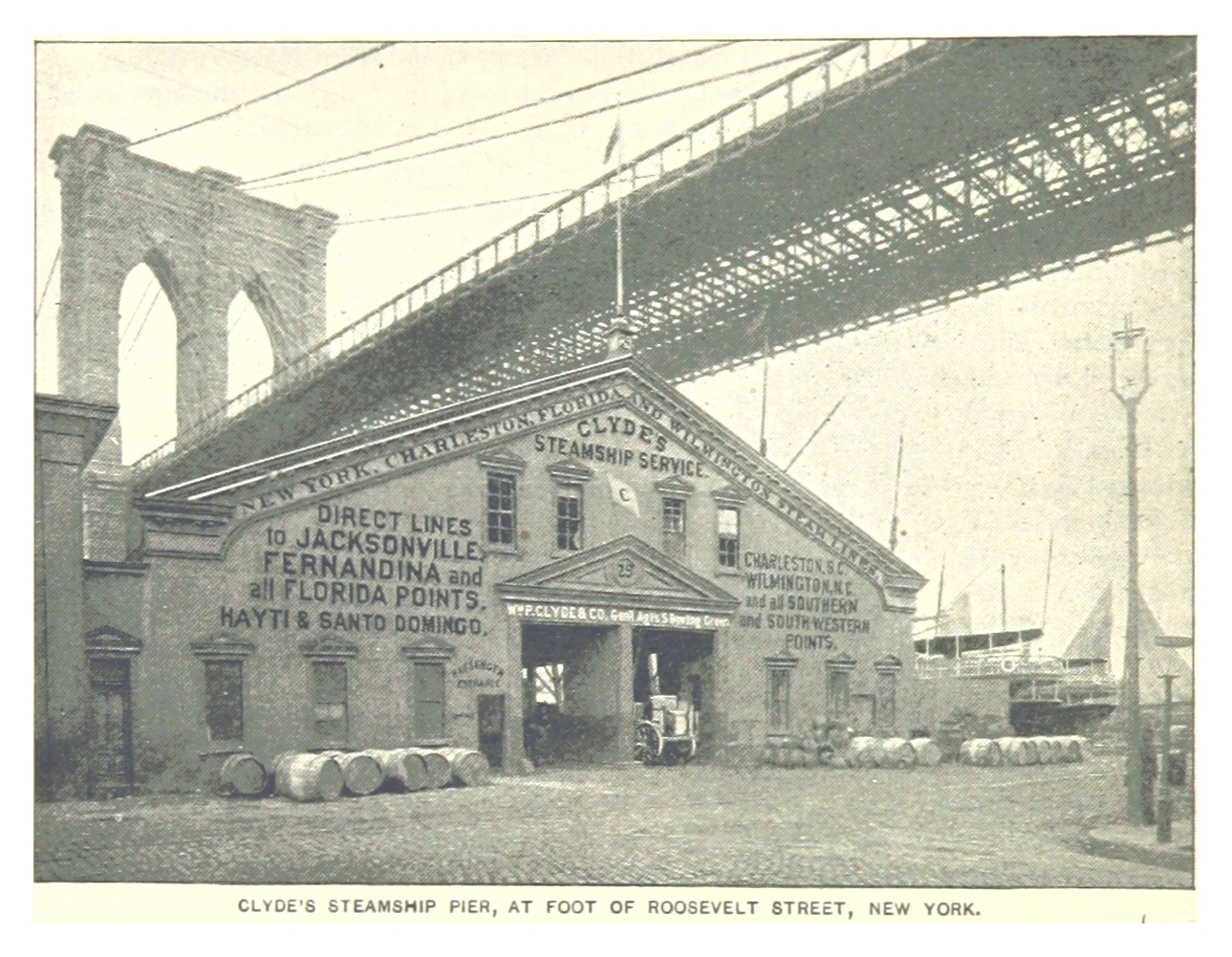
Clyde's Steamship Pier at the end of Roosevelt Street in 1893

Clyde Steamship Company was a steamship transportation company connecting New York City to Florida as well as routes to Boston and Providence, Cuba, New Orleans, and various Keys. William P. Clyde organized the company in 1874 and acquired various ships including the steamboat Beverly, Bristol, Philadelphia, Alliance, A.C. Stimers (likely named for Alban C. Stimers), May Flower, Ann Eliza (perhaps named for Ann Eliza Young) and the canal boats City of Buffalo and Catherine Moan.

In 1882 it had sailings along the west coast of Florida, to New Orleans, down to Key West and Havana. By 1899, it had lines from New York to Wilmington, Brunswick, New York to Philadelphia, Philadelphia to Norfolk, New York to the West Indies, from Boston, Providence, and New York to Jacksonville, Florida as well as a St. John River Line. The steamships connected to rail lines in Florida. Frederick Douglas wrote about his dealings with the company in his autobiography. He was trying to establish a steamship line to Haiti.

In 1902, the company advertised tri-weekly sailings from Jacksonville to New York with a stop in Charleston, South Carolina as well as its St. Johns River line with the City of Jacksonville and routes to Providence and Boston, also stopping in Charleston.

Captains with the line included Augustus Chelton and David Kemp.

In 1926 the S.S. City of Jacksonville served a Christmas dinner that included pickled peaches, Indian relish, fruit fritters, macaroni au gratin, as well as turkey and cranberry sauce and desserts such as fruit cake and pumpkin pie, followed by a demitasse coffee.

== History ==
The Whitney family sold its Metropolitan Steamship Company business to Charles W. Morse in 1906. He organized the Consolidated Steamship Company in January 1907 as a holding company for the Eastern Steamship Company, Metropolitan Steamship Company, Clyde Steamship Company and Mallory Steamship Company.

== See also ==
- Agwilines Inc
