= University of Cosmic Intelligence =

New religious movement

- Type: New religious movement
- Location: United States
- Founder: Rashad Jamal
- Website: theuci.online

The University of Cosmic Intelligence (UCI) is an American new religious movement founded by rapper and convicted child molester Rashad Jamal. Described as a cult, the UCI is primarily based on social media platforms like TikTok and YouTube, and has a predominantly African-American membership. Jamal and the UCI received media attention after followers of Jamal were linked to multiple murders and disappearances. In August 2023, Jamal was convicted of child molestation and cruelty to children and was sentenced to 18 years in prison.

== Background and beliefs ==
The founder of the group, Rashad Jamal (also known as Rashad Jamal White) is from Chicago. Jamal has an extensive criminal history which precedes the founding of UCI, including convictions for battery, strangulation and suffocation, as well as a murder charge for which he was not convicted. Jamal, known as Divine Insight, claims to be a god sent to Earth to heal the planet and that Black and Latino people are gods whom he refers to as "carbonated beings". He has claimed he was sent "to enlighten and inform and increase the frequency of the planet, and to rid this planet of its parasitical invaders". Extraterrestrial beings play a large role in the group's belief system, and they refer to Earth as the planet Ki and to themselves as the Grand Cosmic Rising Family.

Described as a cult, the UCI is primarily based on social media platforms like TikTok and YouTube, and has a predominately African-American membership. Beliefs of the group include that polygamy is essential for men, that the government is engaged in weather modification and efforts to shut off "stargates" to alternate dimensions, and that African Americans are "true" Native Americans instead of being descended from enslaved Africans. The group promotes conspiracy theories, anti-vaccinationism and sovereign citizen-style beliefs. Among Jamal's stranger beliefs are that NBA players are synthetic robots and that birds don't exist but are government tracking devices.

Jamal and the UCI claim to be exempt from United States laws. Extremism researchers have linked Jamal and the UCI's beliefs to the sovereign citizen movement, the Moorish movement and the Nuwaubian Nation. The Guardian described Jamal's teaching as combining "New Age mysticism, polygamy and Afrocentric and black nationalist ideas". Jamal has a combined social media following of more than 300,000. His online platform sells videos of his lectures as well as crystals and jewelry. He has held mass meditation events across the country.

== Incidents ==
The group has been linked to several crimes and arrests, including multiple murders and disappearances. The organization itself does not advocate for murder or violence. On January 16, 2022, 23-year-old Damien Washam of Eight Mile, Alabama, murdered his mother with a ninja sword and also attacked his brother and uncle. Washam's father Hubert blamed Jamal's videos for the murder, stating that Damien had begun watching Jamal's videos a few weeks before the murder and that his behavior suddenly changed and he began expressing bizarre beliefs. Washam was found not guilty by reason of insanity.

In August 2022, two female followers of Jamal named Krystal Pinkins and Yasmine Hider were arrested for the August 14 murder of University of Central Florida (UCF) student Adam Simjee. Simjee and his girlfriend Mikayla Paulus were driving through Cheaha State Park in Alabama when they stopped to help Hider, who claimed her car wouldn't start. Hider than pulled a gun on the couple and demanded that they follow her into the forest. Simjee pulled his own gun and shot Hider who shot Simjee back, killing him. Hider was arrested at the scene of the shooting and law enforcement located and arrested Pinkins a few hours later at an off-the-grid camp in the forest, where the two women had been living. During Pinkins' arrest, her 5-year-old son pointed a shotgun at officers. In January 2024, Hider was sentenced to 35 years in prison while Pinkins received a life sentence.

In August 2023, six people from the St. Louis area, two of them young children, disappeared from a Quality Inn in Florissant, Missouri. The four adults of the group are all followers of Jamal and law enforcement have connected their disappearance to Jamal's encouragement to his followers to go off-the-grid and cut off contact with their families. According to the Berkeley police department, the people in question had quit their jobs, become increasingly isolated from family, and been seen engaging in nude meditation outdoors before their disappearance.

In August 2023, Jamal was convicted of child molestation and cruelty to children in Georgia for sexually abusing a ten-year-old girl. He was sentenced to 18 years in prison followed by 22 years of probation. Jamal's victim was the child of his former partner Darshell Smith, with whom he has a son. Smith stated that Jamal frequently subjected her and her children to screaming rants and that she received harassment from his followers after she disclosed the abuse to law enforcement. Some of Jamal's followers continue to support him despite his conviction, maintaining Jamal's innocence and regarding his conviction and imprisonment as part of a deliberate plot to silence his teachings. After his conviction, UCI social media pages implored followers to continue to send Jamal money.
