= LFF =

LFF may stand for:

== Association football bodies ==
- Federation Libanaise de Football
- Lao Football Federation
- Latvian Football Federation
- Libyan Football Federation
- Lithuanian Football Federation

== Politics and government ==
- Left Foot Forward, a left-wing British blog
- Liberals for Forests, defunct Australian political party
- Liberian Frontier Force (now Armed Forces of Liberia)

== Other uses ==
- BFI London Film Festival
- Lucca Film Festival
- Li's force field, urban myth about Hong Kong's imperviousness to cyclones
- Lincoln Financial Field, a stadium in Philadelphia, Pennsylvania, United States
- Luke fon Fabre, protagonist of the Tales of the Abyss action role-playing game
