= Bielefeld conspiracy =

German satirical conspiracy theory

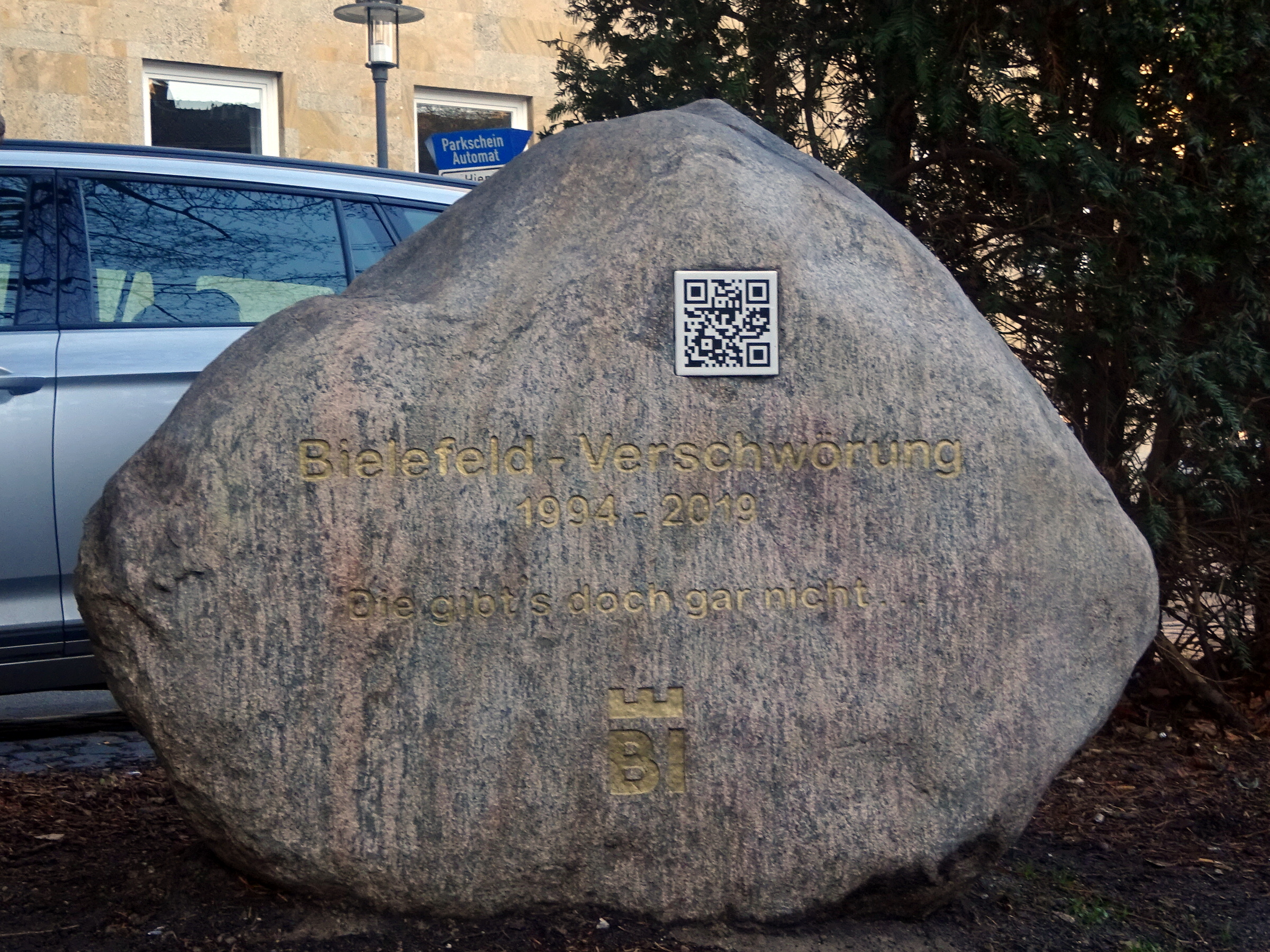
Memorial raised by the city council, declaring the end of the Bielefeld conspiracy

The Bielefeld conspiracy (German: Bielefeldverschwörung or Bielefeld-Verschwörung, pronounced [ˈbiːləfɛltfɛɐ̯ʃvøːʁʊŋ]) is a satirical conspiracy theory that claims the city of Bielefeld, Germany, does not exist, and is instead an illusion propagated by various forces to distract or mislead the German public. First posted on the German Usenet in 1994, the conspiracy has since been mentioned in the city's marketing, and alluded to in a speech by Chancellor Angela Merkel.

== Synopsis ==
The theory proposes that the city of Bielefeld (population of 341,755 as of December 2021) in the German state of North-Rhine-Westphalia does not actually exist. Rather, its existence is merely propagated by an entity known only as SIE (German for "THEY"), which has conspired with the authorities to create the illusion of the city's existence.

The theory is based on three questions:

1. Do you know anybody from "Bielefeld"?
2. Have you ever been to "Bielefeld"?
3. Do you know anybody who has ever been to "Bielefeld"?

A majority are expected to answer no to all three queries. Anybody who can answer yes to any of the queries, or claim any other knowledge about "Bielefeld", is promptly disregarded as being in on the conspiracy or having been deceived themselves.

The origins of and reasons for this conspiracy are not a part of the original theory. Speculated originators jokingly include the Central Intelligence Agency, Mossad, or aliens who use Bielefeld University as a disguise for their spaceship.

== History ==
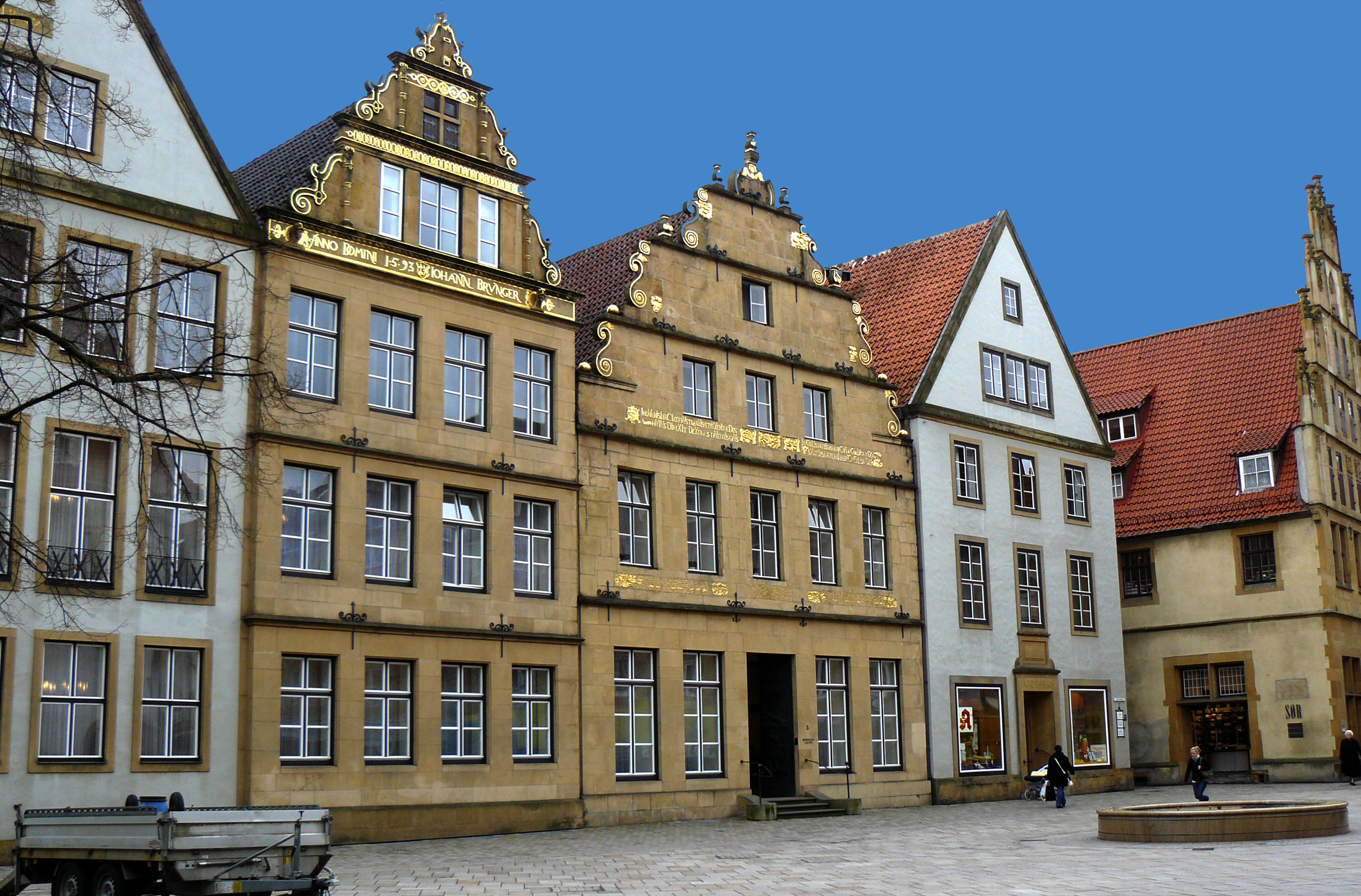
Bielefeld, Germany

The conspiracy theory was first made public in a posting to the newsgroup de.talk.bizarre on 16 May 1994 by Achim Held, a computer science student at Kiel University. When a friend of Held met someone from Bielefeld at a student party in 1993, he said "Das gibt's doch gar nicht". This statement has a double-meaning: "Unbelievable!" and "That doesn't exist". The second meaning spread throughout the German-speaking Internet community.

In a television interview conducted for the 10th anniversary of the newsgroup posting, Held stated that this myth definitely originated from his Usenet posting, which was intended only as a joke. According to Held, the idea for the conspiracy theory formed in his mind at a student party while speaking to an avid reader of New Age magazines, and from a car journey past Bielefeld at a time when the exit from the Autobahn to it was closed.

Historian Alan Lessoff notes that a reason for the amusement value of the theory is Bielefeld's lack of notable features, as being home to no major institutions or tourist attractions and not being on the course of a major river: "'Bielefeld' defines nondescript."

== Public reception ==
In November 2012, German Chancellor Angela Merkel referred to the conspiracy in public when talking about a town hall meeting she had attended in Bielefeld, adding: "... if it exists at all", and "I had the impression that I was there".

The BBC World Service and The New York Times made reference to the conspiracy in 2025 as part of their coverage when football club Arminia Bielefeld surprisingly became a finalist in the DFB-Pokal.

=== Official response ===
The city council of Bielefeld made efforts to generate publicity for Bielefeld and build a nationally known public image of the city. However, even ten years after the conspiracy started, the mayor's office still received phone calls and e-mails which claimed to doubt the existence of the city.

On April Fools' Day in 1999, five years after the myth started to spread, the city council released a press statement titled Bielefeld gibt es doch! ("Bielefeld does exist!"). In allusion to the origin of the conspiracy, the 800th anniversary of Bielefeld was held in 2014 under the motto Das gibt's doch gar nicht ("Unbelievable!", literally "That doesn't exist").

In August 2019, the council offered to give €1 million to any person who could provide "incontrovertible evidence" of Bielefeld's nonexistence in an effort to increase interest in the city. As no-one was able to prove Bielefeld's non-existence, the city therefore sees its own existence as conclusive and the conspiracy as ended. To commemorate it, the city erected a glacial erratic block in the historic center near the Leineweber monument. A QR code on it directs to further background information.

== Film ==
In 2009, film students at Bielefeld University started a project to develop a feature film based on the Bielefeld conspiracy. The project was financed by the university and local sponsors. Most of the project's staff and actors were students or university employees, a few professionals, such as the actress Julia Kahl and cameraman Alexander Böke, joined the project. The screenplay was written by Thomas Walden. The film premiered in Bielefeld on 2 June 2010.

== Similar satirical conspiracy theories ==
Similar satirical conspiracy theories have been made about other places, such as Australia, the town of Dingwall in Scotland, the Brazilian state of Acre (Acre conspiracy), Finland, the Portuguese city of Leiria, the Israeli cities of Petah Tikva and Ness Tziona, the Italian region of Molise, the US state of Wyoming, the Argentine province of La Pampa, Paraguay, the Mexican state of Tlaxcala, the Dutch province of Drenthe, the Greek city of Kilkis, the Iranian city of Semnan, the Japanese prefecture Saitama, the Ukrainian city of Zhytomyr, the Belgian city of Hasselt, the Spanish provinces of Murcia and Teruel, the Chilean city of Rancagua, Barrancabermeja in Colombia, the Irish country of Leitrim, and the rest of Russia outside of Moscow Ring Road.

== See also ==
- Acre conspiracy
- Birds Aren't Real
- Li's field
- Omission of New Zealand from maps
- Omission of Tasmania from maps of Australia
- Ted Cruz–Zodiac Killer meme
- Teruel Existe

== Bibliography ==
- Butkus, Günther, ed. (2010). Rätselhaftes Bielefeld. Die Verschwörung (in German). Pendragon0. ISBN 978-3-86532-188-6.
- Walden, Thomas (2010). Die Bielefeld-Verschwörung. Der Roman zum Film (in German). Pendragon. ISBN 978-3-86532-194-7.
- von Halle, Karl-Heinz (2013). Gibt es Bielefeld oder gibt es Bielefeld nicht? (in German). Eichborn-Verlag. ISBN 978-3-8479-0546-2.
- Walden, Thomas (2012). Drachenzeit in Bielefeld: Aufgabe 2 der Bielefeld Verschwörung (in German). tredition. ISBN 978-3-8472-3859-1.
