= Acre conspiracy =

Satirical conspiracy theory concerning the Brazilian state of Acre

State of Acre, Brazil

The Acre conspiracy (Portuguese: Conspiração do Acre) is a satirical conspiracy theory claiming that the Brazilian state of Acre does not exist or is inhabited by non-avian dinosaurs. This humorous theory is the Brazilian equivalent of that attached to the German city of Bielefeld. It was studied in scholarly articles. The conspiracy is cited in news articles and has been studied in academic papers. A 2014 academic article by Giselle Xavier d'Ávila Lucena notes that "it is possible to affirm the existence of a decontextualization of the history of Acre, resulting from the dynamics of media production and distribution." The author adds that the spatial definition of Acre added to these mediated processes and "crystallized an experience of denial." Ultimately, the narratives delineating Acre's history make people "imagine the refusal, the disregard, and the irresponsibility with which the Brazilian government treated it on many different occasions."

The Acre state government itself has acknowledged the case. In a 2020 article on its website, the government commented: "[...] there are some people who insist on saying that Acre does not exist. And then I tell you: how can it not exist?" Another article from 2022 explicitly stated in its title that "Acre exists." In January 2020, the Secretary of Tourism in Acre published a poll on Instagram proposing to sculpt dinosaurs at the state's entrance portal. The state's tourism secretary, Eliane Sinhasique, explained the proposal by noting that "dinosaurs have always been a source of mockery in relation to Acre, when people question whether the state exists."

The meme has also had a significant impact on social media and pop culture. Ayres Rocha, an anchor for Rede Amazônica, made a statement "proving" that Acre exists during his debut on the national news program Jornal Nacional, generating various memes. In April 2018, "DinoAcre,” a two-meter inflatable dinosaur costume worn by cinematographer Moisés Santos in response to the dinosaur memes, made headlines and became highly popular on the Internet. Additionally, "This Is Acre," a parody of the song "This Is America" based on local legends, achieved viral success. Its creators were inspired by jokes surrounding the non-existence of the state.

The meme has even been used by the Secretary of Tourism of the Government of Brazil, who proposed placing dinosaurs on the entrance sign to the state as a tourist attraction. The videographer Moisés Santos also used the joke of the presence of dinosaurs in the state to dress in a 2.20-meter-tall dinosaur costume, a fact that had a great impact on social networks.

== See also ==
- Bielefeld conspiracy
- Listenbourg
