= Birds Aren't Real =

Satirical conspiracy theory

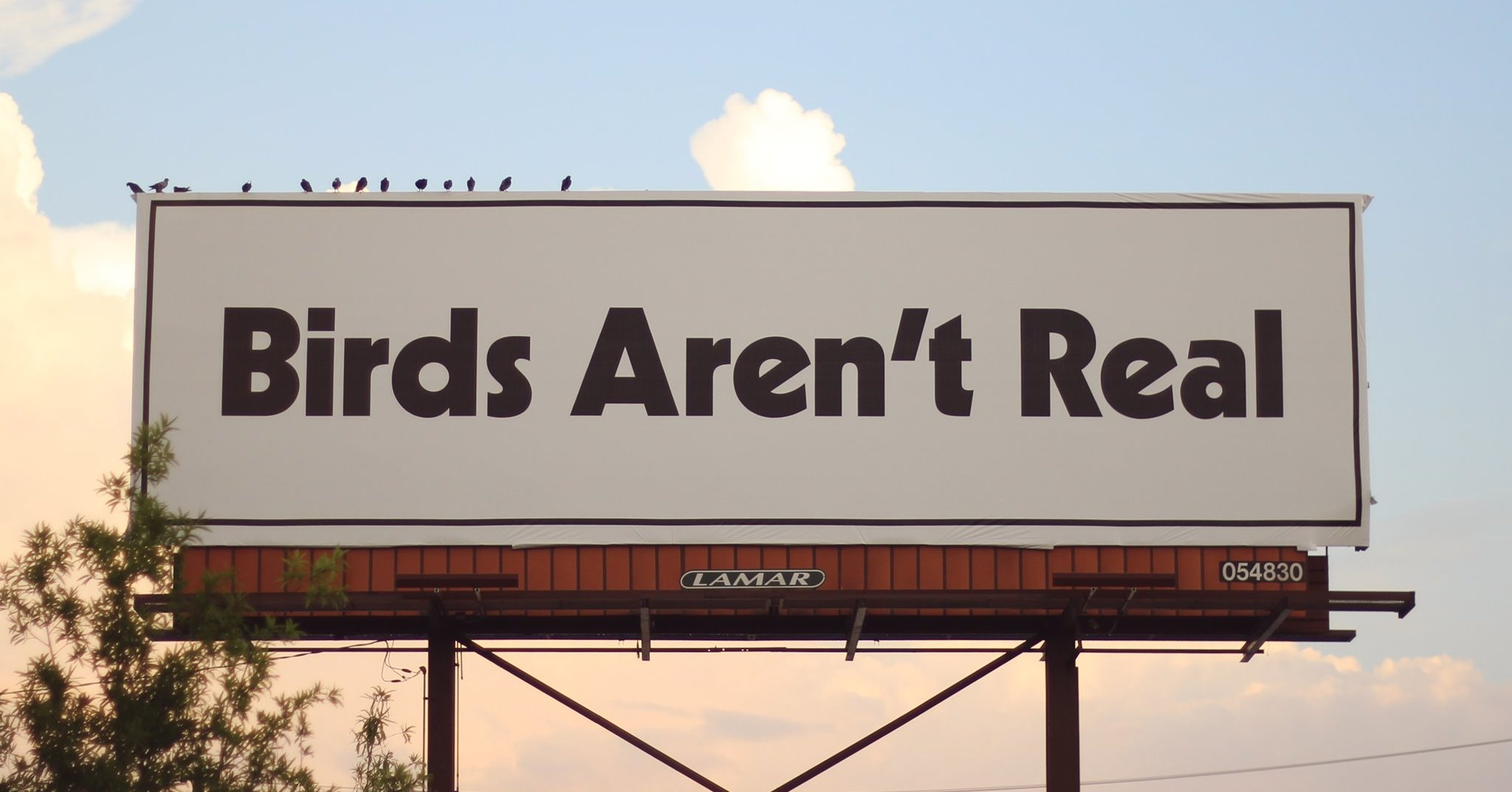
A "Birds Aren't Real" billboard in Memphis, Tennessee, 2019

Birds Aren't Real is a satirical conspiracy theory which posits that birds are actually drones operated by the United States government to spy on American citizens. In 2018, journalist Rachel Roberts described Birds Aren't Real as "a joke that thousands of people are in on".

== Background ==
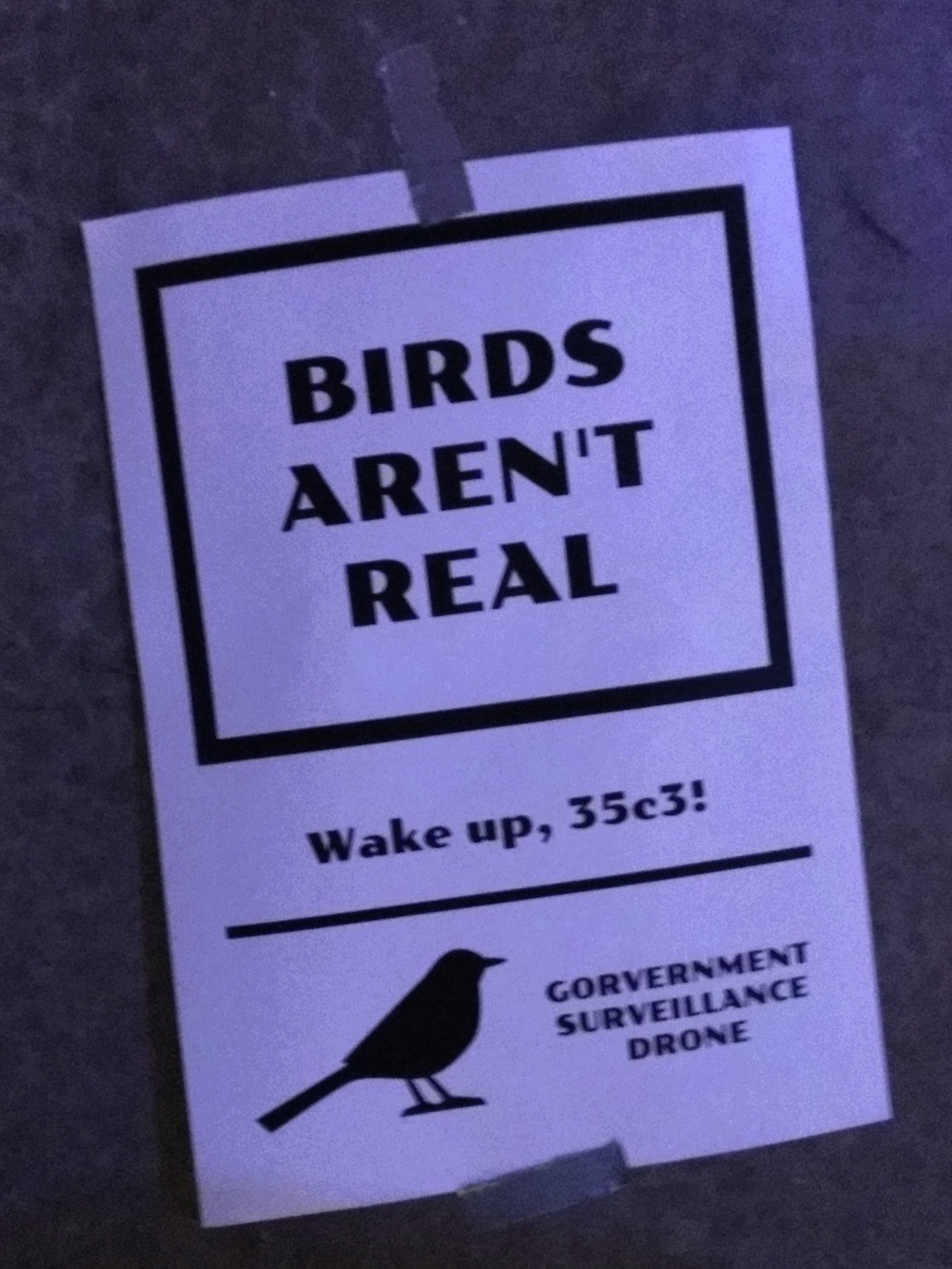
Poster inspired by the movement at the 35th Chaos Communication Congress conference in 2018

Peter McIndoe created the satirical conspiracy theory "on a whim" in January 2017. After seeing pro-Trump counter-protestors at the 2017 Women's March in Memphis, Tennessee, McIndoe wrote "Birds Aren't Real" on a poster and improvised a conspiracy theory amongst the counter-protestors as a "spontaneous joke". A video of McIndoe at the march went viral, which started the satirical movement. In 2017, he posted on Facebook: "I made a satirical movement a few months ago, and people on Instagram seem to like it a lot." He later disclaimed the post, saying it was written by a staffer who was fired, and did not admit until 2021 that he did not truly believe the conspiracy.

The movement claims that all birds in the United States were exterminated by the federal government between 1959 and 1971 and replaced by lookalike drones used by the government to spy on citizens; the specifics of these theories are not always consistent, not unlike other conspiracy theories. The movement is characterized by using catchy slogans like "If it flies, it spies" which can be found on various merchandise articles. They claim that birds sit on power lines to recharge themselves, that birds defecate on cars as a liquid tracking method, and that U.S. president John F. Kennedy was assassinated by the government due to his reluctance to kill all the birds.

In 2018, news about the development of actual high-tech surveillance bird drones in China came to light, claiming that multiple military and government agencies used these drones for surveillance purposes in multiple provinces of China.

== Supporters ==
Some supporters have demonstrated with signs stating "Birds Aren't Real" and related slogans. In 2019, a billboard was erected stating "Birds Aren't Real" in Memphis, Tennessee. In 2021, some supporters demonstrated in front of Twitter's San Francisco headquarters demanding that the company change its bird logo. In 2021, MSNBC said that the movement had hundreds of thousands of members.

Supporters mainly consist of a cross-generational community whose interest stemmed from a satirical view on internet conspiratorial theories.

== Media appearances ==
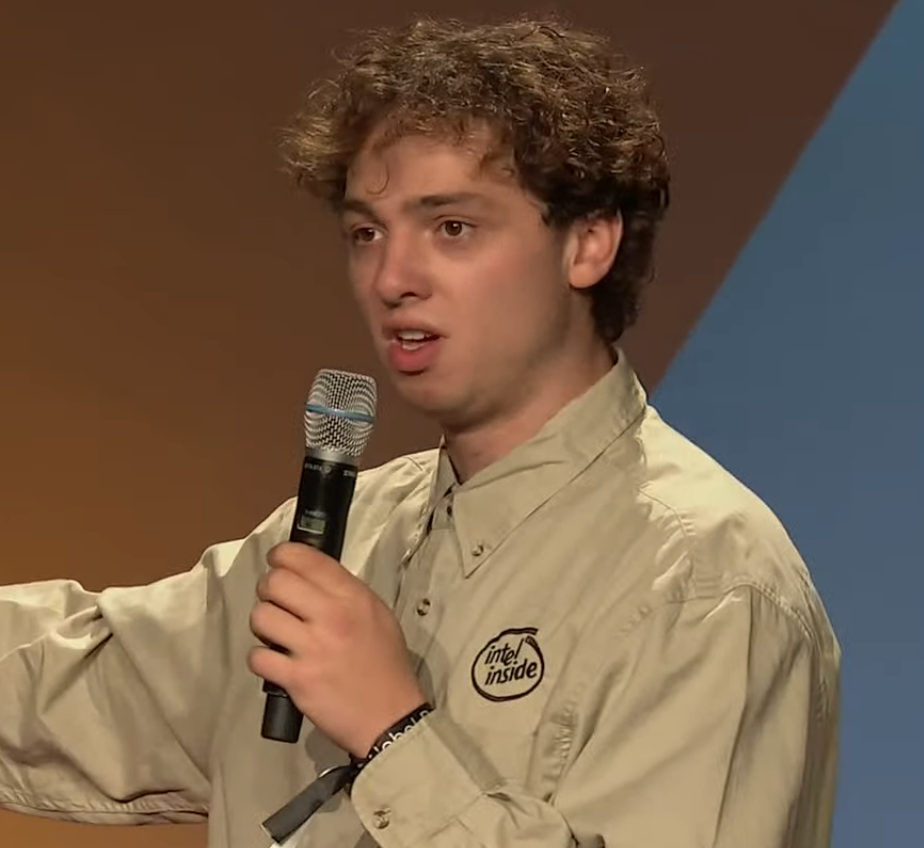
Peter McIndoe, creator of Birds Aren't Real, at the 2023 Nobel Summit in Washington, D.C.

McIndoe has made multiple media appearances along with his co-founder, Connor Gaydos, and Claire Chronis. They have done multiple interviews promoting the Birds Aren't Real movement. In 2021, McIndoe stated that he works full-time as a spokesperson for the movement, making money from sales of merchandise.

In a 2019 interview with WREG-TV, McIndoe said that he was offended by a question about whether the movement was satirical, as such a question would not be asked of the opposite opinion (that birds are real). On January 6, 2022, McIndoe threw up during a live TV interview with the Chicago-based WGN9. Adweek called it an "apparent prank" and McIndoe labeled it a "hit job".

In January 2022, McIndoe and Gaydos featured in a profile of the movement for Vice, giving his first media interview while not in character. In May 2022, McIndoe, Gaydos, and Chronis were interviewed by 60 Minutes. He started off the interview in character, but later broke character and described the purpose behind creating the satirical movement: "So it's taking this concept of misinformation and almost building a little safe space to come together within it and laugh at it, rather than be scared by it. And accept the lunacy of it all and be a bird truther for a moment in time when everything's so crazy." In April 2023, McIndoe held a TED Talk about the movement in which he posits that feeling excluded leads folks to adopt conspiracies and proposes that empathy – rather than confrontation – is the best way to respond. He later claimed to be working on a Birds Aren't Real movie in an interview with the Hub at Johns Hopkins University.

== See also ==
- Bielefeld conspiracy
- Li's field
- Society for Indecency to Naked Animals
