= Li's field =

Satirical conspiracy theory on tropical cyclones near Hong Kong

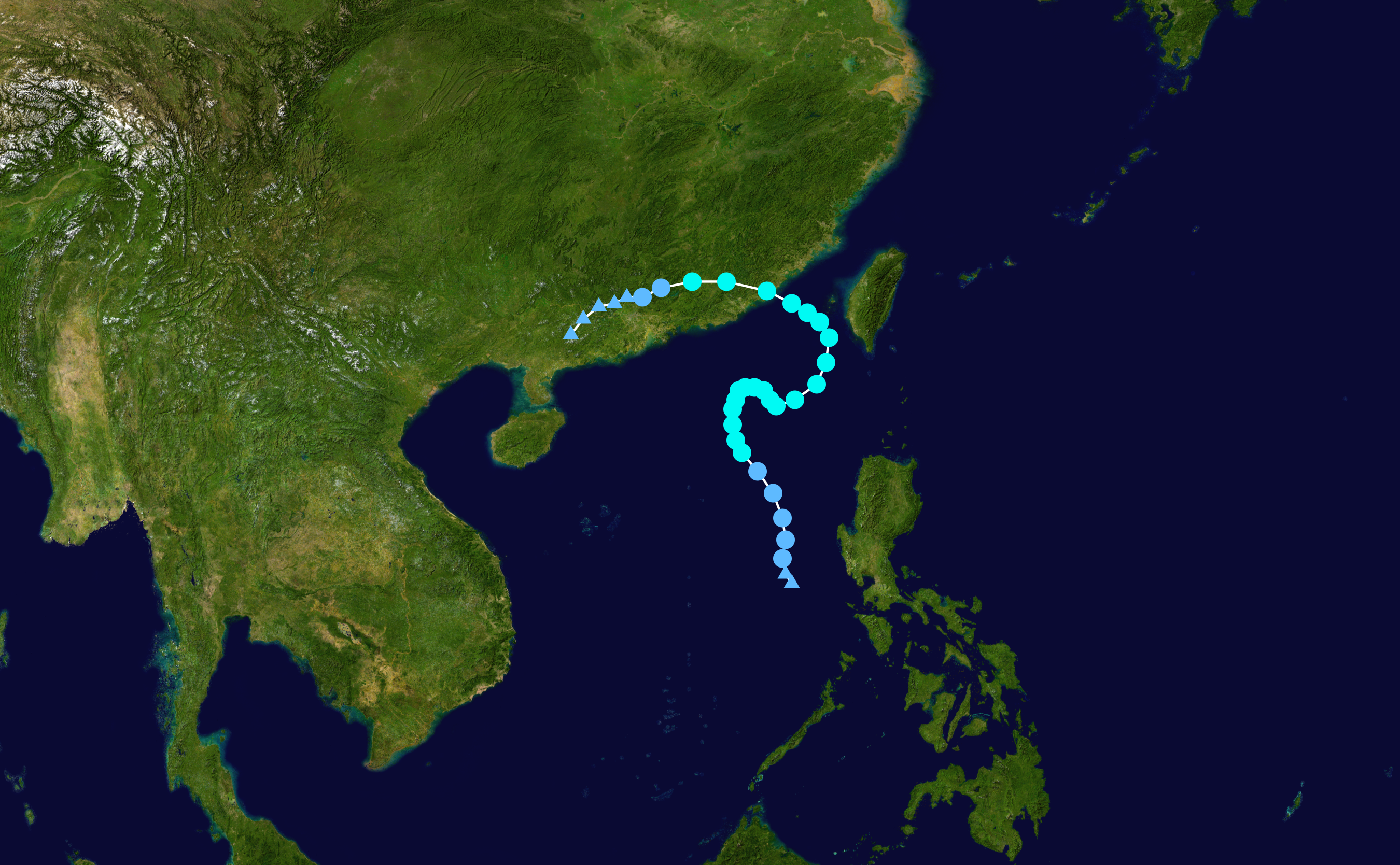
In 2010, Severe Tropical Storm Lionrock is clearly shown to have peculiarly avoided Hong Kong.

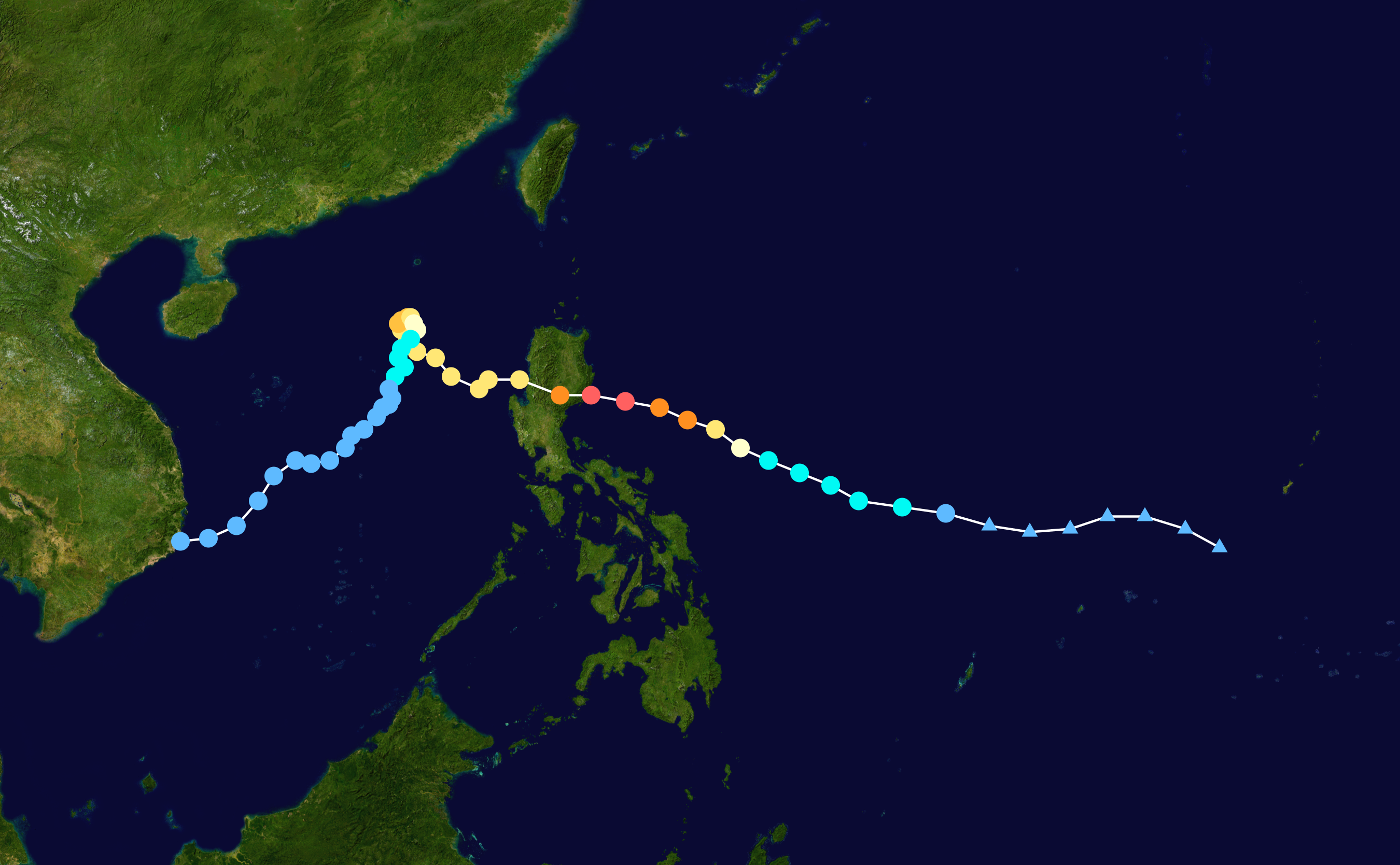
Typhoon Cimaron (2006) was seemingly repelled away from Hong Kong.

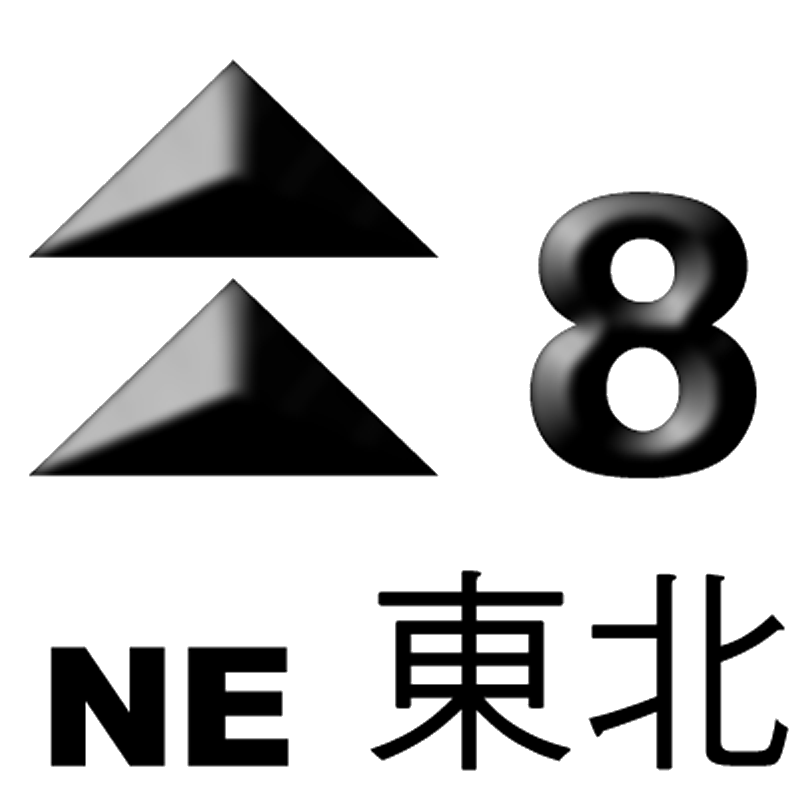
Some people blamed Li Ka-shing for Hong Kong Observatory's insistence of not issuing a single No. 8 Storm Signal from 2005 to 2006.

Li's field (Chinese: 李氏力場) is a satirical conspiracy theory in Hong Kong over the existence of a force field that repels tropical cyclones from the city.

== Background ==
The "Li" in Li's field refers to local business tycoon Li Ka-shing, the implied developer of the field. The basis of Li's field rests on the way Hong Kong's government is organized. The city's Commerce and Economic Development Bureau oversees the Hong Kong Observatory, and that has led to speculations the Observatory bases its issuance of tropical cyclone warning signals on economic reasoning, instead of scientific reasoning.

In Hong Kong, schools above kindergarten level are shut down when Tropical Cyclone Signal Number 8 is issued (kindergarten classes are suspended when Signal Number 3 is issued), and all non-essential staff at a workplace are sent home. Some believe businesses have pressured the Observatory into avoiding the issuance of Typhoon Signal Number 8, in an effort to avoid economic losses.

In response, former Observatory Chief Lee Boon Ying told reporters in 2010 the Observatory has always put the safety of Hong Kong residents as its first priority, and is not swayed by business or economic concerns.

== Examples ==
From 2005 to 2006, and again in 2010, the Observatory did not issue a single tropical cyclone warning above Number 3.

=== Typhoon Prapiroon ===
In 2006, Typhoon Prapiroon brought gale to storm winds (63-117 km/h, Beaufort scale force 8–11) to Hong Kong, fulfilling the requirements for the No.8 Gale or Storm signal. The storm overturned containers, uprooted trees, and caused many flight delays at the airport, but the Observatory did not issue Signal Number 8, remaining at the lower level Signal Number 3.

Observatory Chief Lam Chiu-ying later said the decision was based on the fact that wind speeds in Kai Tak, near the Victoria Harbour, did not reach the level required for issuing Signal Number 8. Nevertheless, humorous speculation arose that Li Ka-shing was behind the decision, in an effort to maximize productivity from his workers and prop up the economy.

== Scientific reason ==
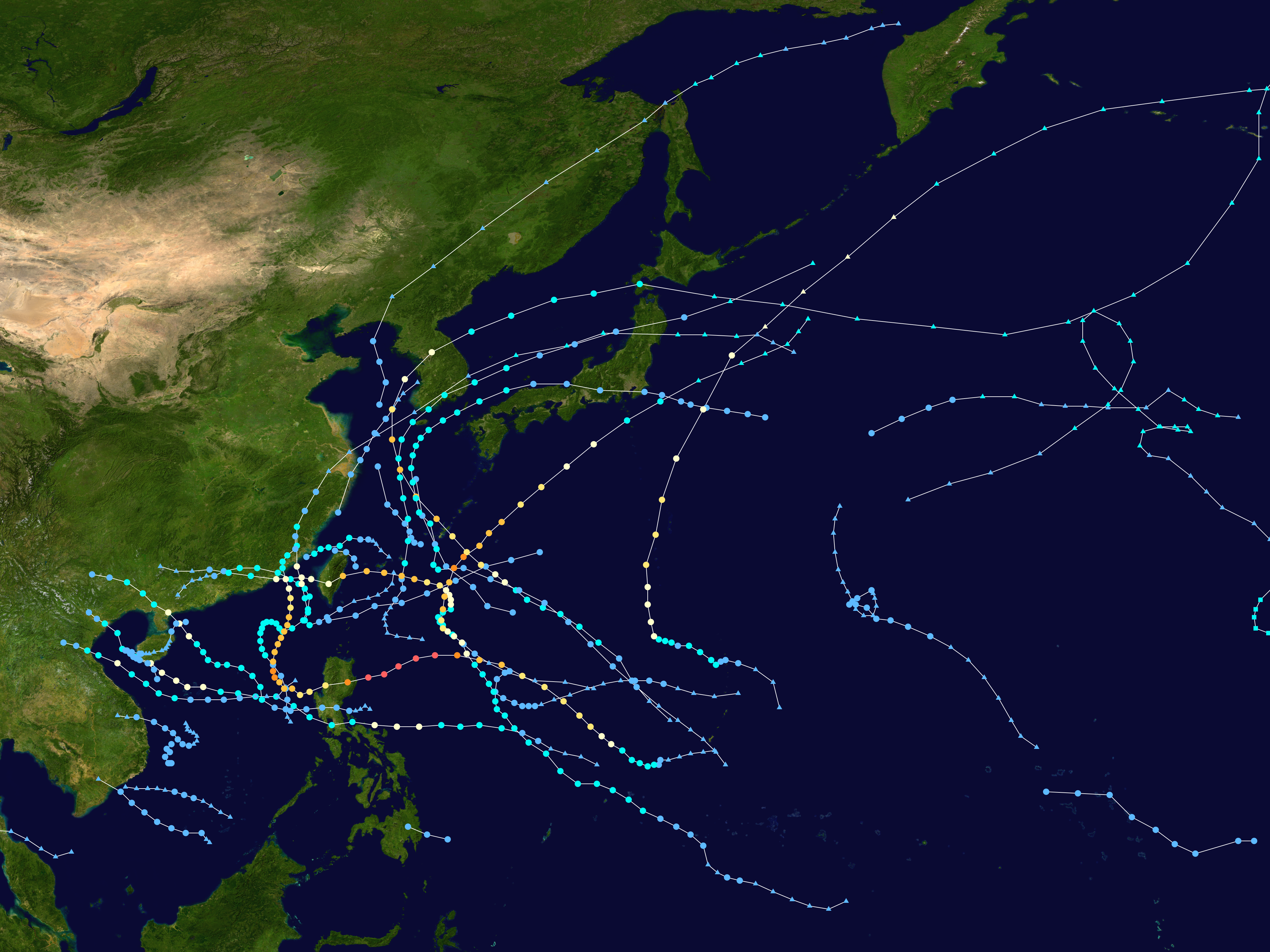
A track map of all storms in the 2010 Pacific typhoon season. No typhoons came across Hong Kong that year.

Media reports in 2010, citing research by the Observatory, revealed the reason behind the fewer occurrences of Signal Number 8. It is believed that an ocean temperature difference between the South China Sea and the Pacific Ocean provides the explanation. However, some people believed the Li's Field made the huge difference in temperature between the South China Sea and the Pacific Ocean.

== Cultural references ==
Li's force field has been mentioned in local cultural media, and has been the subject of many Internet memes.

=== "Gambling wall" in Macau ===
A similar urban legend spread in Macau after Tropical Storm Nida (2016), when the Macao Meteorological and Geophysical Bureau (SMG) only issued a No. 3 typhoon signal, despite it reaching the standards of a No. 8. Some residents believed the SMG did so because the issuance of a No. 8 signal would affect the opening hours of casinos (which represent Macau's largest industry), leading them to joke that there was a "賭牆" (literally: "gambling wall", homophonous in Cantonese with 賭場 "casino") which protected Macau from typhoons, much like Li's field.

== See also ==
- Bielefeld conspiracy
- Birds Aren't Real
- Hong Kong tropical cyclone warning signals
