= Geological Society of Glasgow =

Scottish scientific organization

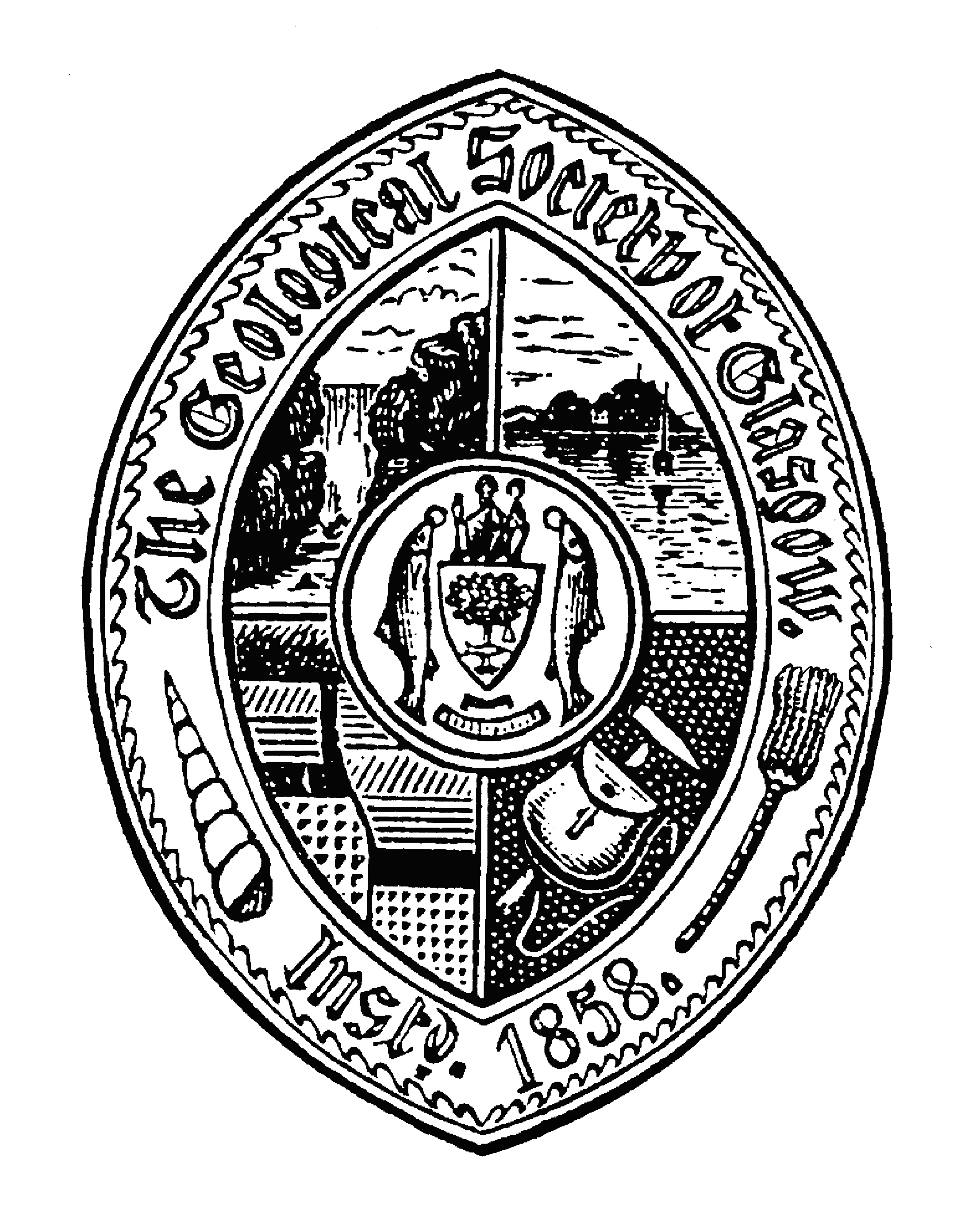
- Formation: 17 May 1858
- Founded at: Free St Peter's Church, Blythswood Street, Glasgow
- Type: Learned society
- Registration no.: SC007013
- Headquarters: Molema Building, Glasgow University
- Coordinates: 55.872121°N 4.2882°W
- Members: 341 (2024-25)
- Website: www.geologyglasgow.org.uk

The Geological Society of Glasgow (GSG) is a learned society devoted to the study of geology in Scotland. Founded in Glasgow on 17 May 1858, it is a registered Scottish charity (no. SC007013) whose stated aim is "promoting public interest in geology and advancing geological knowledge". Membership is open to anyone interested in geology.

Past presidents of the Society include Lord Kelvin, Archibald Geikie, Charles Lapworth, Ben Peach, and John Walter Gregory. The Society states that its early work contributed to the understanding of Scotland's glacial history and of the relationship between the Earth's rotation and climate change.

Each session the Society holds a programme of public lectures, usually on the second Thursday of the month, and organises field excursions in spring and summer. It publishes an annual Proceedings and, from 1860, issued the Transactions of the Geological Society of Glasgow, which were replaced in 1965 by the Scottish Journal of Geology, a journal jointly owned with the Edinburgh Geological Society. It awards the T.N. George Medal for excellence in palaeontology and stratigraphy, and supports geoconservation in the Strathclyde region through the Geosites project, formerly through the disbanded Strathclyde Geoconservation Group (SGG).

== History ==
Foundation

The Society was founded on 17 May 1858, when a group of young men decided to set up an organisation devoted specifically to the study of geology. Its first meeting was held in the vestry of Free St. Peter's Church in Glasgow. The early members were largely amateur enthusiasts, and the Society's own history links their interest to a growing demand for scientific knowledge among working people in a rapidly expanding city. James Pinkerton Fraser was its first president. The Society's first field excursion, to Campsie Glen, took place in June 1858, and some of the fossils collected on these early outings can still be seen in Kelvingrove Museum.

Meeting places

In its early decades the Society changed meeting place several times. After its first meetings at the church vestry and McCallum's Coffee House on Glassford Street, it met at the Athenaeum on Ingram Street from June 1858 to July 1859. Between 1859 and 1863 it had no fixed home and met at venues including the Merchants' Hall and Mechanics' Institution on Bath Street. In 1863 it moved to the Andersonian University (now the University of Strathclyde) on George Street, and in 1880 to the building of the Royal Philosophical Society of Glasgow at 207 Bath Street, where it stayed until 1961. It then met at the Royal College of Science and Technology and afterwards in the University of Glasgow's Department of Geology, until the Gregory Building (now the Molema Building) opened in 1974. The Society now holds its meetings in the lecture theatre at Kelvin Hall.

Scientific contributions

The Society drew leading figures of Scottish and British geology into its meetings and publications. Lord Kelvin was president from 1872 to 1893, and later presidents included Archibald Geikie, Charles Lapworth, Ben Peach, and John Walter Gregory. The Society states that its early work contributed to the understanding of Scotland's glacial history, geological time, and the relationship between Earth's rotation and climate change. In 1928, Arthur Holmes presented to the Society his proposal that convection currents in the Earth's mantle could drive the movement of the continents, a paper that was published in the Society's Transactions in 1931. The Society's research interests in the twentieth century included igneous rocks of Scotland, mineralogy, palaeontology, and plate tectonics. The Society today continually awards grants and awards to researchers in pursuit of advancing the knowledge of Scottish and British geology.

Twentieth century and centenary

Murray MacGregor, who was president from 1926 to 1929 and was associated with the Society for 55 years, wrote a history of its first hundred years for the centenary edition of the Transactions, published in 1958. Other twentieth-century presidents included Edward Battersby Bailey, Arthur Edward Trueman, Ethel Currie, and T. Neville George, the latter being Professor of Geology at Glasgow from 1947 to 1974 and helped plan the Gregory (now Molema) Building. In 1965 the Society's Transactions were replaced by the Scottish Journal of Geology, which it jointly owns with the Edinburgh Geological Society.

== Activities ==
Lectures

The Society holds a programme of monthly lectures that are open to the public. They are usually held on the second Thursday of the month in the lecture theatre at Kelvin Hall, and each is followed by a social session at which members of the audience can meet the speaker. The programme has also included Members' Nights, and the presentation of the T.N George Medal is followed by a memorial lecture given by the recipient. Lectures from Session 164 (2021-22) onwards are recorded and published on the Society's YouTube channel. The Society also holds informal meetings called GeoNatter, where people can look at rocks and fossils, chat informally, ask questions, and hear what is happening locally.

Excursions

The Society organises field excursions in spring and summer. These include day excursions led by experienced guides, one of which is held jointly with the Edinburgh Geological Society, and residential excursions lasting a weekend or longer. During the COVID-19 pandemic it also record virtual field excursions.

Geoconservation

The Society's Strathclyde Geoconservation Group (SGG), now disbanded, carried out casework on sites in the region, including the Carboniferous fossil trees of Fossil Grove and the Highland Boundary Fault zone, and contributed to a geodiversity audit for North Lanarkshire Council. The group published notes and leaflets on around 23 Local Sites of Interest, including Fossil Grove, Dumbarton Rock, and The Whangie. Its work has been continues by the Glasgow Geosites Group, an informal working group of the Council that is open to all members. The group contributes to the Scottish Geology Trusts' Geosites project, launched in June 2023, which aims to place Scotland's best geological sires on an interactive online map. It runs field days in Greater Glasgow to assess selected sites and add information and photographs to the project.

Grants

The Society considers applications for grants from individuals and organisations for projects that advance its aims through events, fieldwork, and research. Applicants must have a Scottish link, and recipients must acknowledge the Society's support and report to it within nine months.

Library

The Society's library, housed in the university of Glasgow's Molema Building, holds books, journals and excursion guides. It is available to members, though access is currently limited.

== Publications ==
Transactions and the Scottish Journal of Geology

The Society began publishing its Transactions of the Geological Society of Glasgow in 1860. They included papers by James Croll, Archibald Geikie, Lord Kelvin, and Joseph Tyrell, and Arthur Holmes's 1931 paper on mantle convection. A centenary edition appeared in 1959, with a history of the Society's first hundred years by Murray MacGregor. The complete series is available online through the Geological Society of London's Lyell Collection. In 1965, the Transactions were replaced by the Scottish Journal of Geology, which succeeded both the Glasgow Transactions and the Edinburgh Geological Society's own Transactions, begun in 1863. The journal is the joint property of the two societies. It covers the geology of Scotland and adjacent areas, including the surrounding seas, and also publishes review articles, short communications and discussions of earlier papers. It is now published online, and its articles are distributed through the Lyell Collection and GeoScienceWorld.

Proceedings and newsletters

Before the 1963-64 session the Society's Proceedings were published as part of the Transactions. Since then they have appeared as a separate annual publication containing reports of the Society's meetings and excursions, sometimes with geological guides to the areas visited. Back issues from the from the 1963-64 Session to the 2024-25 are available online as PDFs. The Society also issues newsletters to members, containing its lecture, excursion, and social programmes, and has archived them online from Session 156 (2013-14).

Field guides

The Society has published and supported a series of field guides to Scottish and overseas localities. These include A Field Guide to the Geology of Madeira (C.J. Burton and J.G. MacDonald, 2008), Field Guide to the Geology of Gigha & Cara (J.G. MacDonald, second edition, 2021) and A Guide to the Geology of Skye and Raasay by Brian Bell (2022), made freely available as a PDF. It also offers the fourth edition of A Guide to the Geology of Islay (David Webster, Roger Anderton, and Alasdair Skelton, 2025) and companion guides to Colonsay and Jura by Webster, all published by Ringwood Publishing. An earlier guide covered the Island of Arran.

== T.N George Medal ==
History

The Thomas Neville George Medal is awarded by the Society for excellence in palaeontology and/or stratigraphy. It is named after Thomas Neville George (1904-1980), who was Professor of Geology at the University of Glasgow from 1947 to 1974, Dean of the Faculty of Science from 1951 to 1955 and twice president of the Society. He helped plan the university's Gregory Building, which opened in 1974, shortly after he retired. The medal is presented at one of the Society's lecture meetings, after which the recipient gives a memorial lecture. It was first awarded in October 1982 to Charles H. Holland, and 26 medals had been awarded by February 2026.

Recipients

Source: Geological Society of Glasgow

- 1982 Charles H. Holland
- 1983 John F. Dewey
- 1984 Michael R. House
- 1985 Sir Alwyn Williams
- 1986 Alan Goodwin
- 1987 Walter Mykura
- 1989 Stephen Jay Gould
- 1989 Peter Ziegler
- 1991 J.W. Murray
- 1992 W.J. Kennedy
- 1993 Dianne Edwards
- 1995 Peter Vail
- 1996 Bill Chaloner
- 1997 W. Stuart McKerrow
- 1999 Euan N.K. Clarkson
- 1999 John Hudson
- 2001 G. Russell Coope
- 2002 Richard Jefferies
- 2004 J. Keith Ingham
- 2006 Michael Benton
- 2007 Richard A. Fortey
- 2009 Nigel Trewin
- 2013 Jenny Clack
- 2015 John Cope
- 2018 Tony Spencer
- 2026 Elsa Panciroli
- 2027 T.B.A

Brian Bluck Medal

The Society also awards a second medal, the Brian Bluck Medal, with a monetary prize. This is awarded to the best-performing student in Earth Science honours at the University of Glasgow. It was first awarded in 2016 as a memorial to Brian Bluck, Professor of Geology at the university, who died on 19 June 2015.

== Presidents and members ==
=== Presidents ===
Presidents of the Society are elected by the members. The presidents, with the year of their election, have been:

Source: Geological Society of Glasgow

- 1858 James Pinkerton Fraser
- 1860 John Scouler
- 1864 James Smith of Jordanhill
- 1867 John Young
- 1872 William Thompson (Lord Kelvin)
- 1893 Archibald Geikie
- 1899 Charles Lapworth
- 1902 Ramsay H. Traquair
- 1905 Benjamin N. Peach
- 1908 John Walter Gregory
- 1917 Robert Kidston
- 1920 Peter MacNair
- 1923 George Walter Tyrrel
- 1926 Murray MacGregor
- 1929 James Ernest Richey
- 1932 Edward Battersby Bailey
- 1935 James L. Begg
- 1938 Arthur E. Trueman
- 1941 John Weir
- 1944 Benjamin H. Barrett
- 1947 John Graham Comrie Anderson
- 1949 T. Neville George
- 1952 Ethel D. Currie
- 1955 T. Neville George
- 1958 William R. Flett
- 1961 James Phemister
- 1964 Edward M. Patterson
- 1967 Adam C. McLean
- 1970 Douglas S. Weedon
- 1973 W.D Ian Rolfe
- 1976 Alexander Herriot
- 1979 James G. MacDonald
- 1982 W. Edward Tremlett
- 1985 Judith Lawson
- 1988 Michael C. Keen
- 1991 Allan J. Hall
- 1994 James G. MacDonald
- 1997 Janey E. MacDougall
- 2000 Colin J.R. Braithwaite
- 2003 Christopher J. Burton
- 2006 Alan W. Owen
- 2009 Margaret Donnelly
- 2012 Brian Bell
- 2015 James Morrison
- 2018 Neil Clark
- 2021 Simon Cuthbert
- 2024 Margaret Greene

=== Other notable members ===
- Elizabeth Gray, Scottish fossil hunter, became honorary member in 1900
- Thomas King, Scottish botanist
- Archibald Lamont
- John Young (1823–1900), one of the first people elected an Honorary Associate of the society on its foundation.

== See also ==
- Geology of Scotland
- Edinburgh Geological Society
- Geological Society of London
- Royal Philosophical Society of Glasgow
