= Ethel Currie =

Scottish geologist

Ethel Currie DSc FRSE FGS FGSG
- Born: Ethel Dobbie Currie; 4 December 1899; Glasgow, Scotland
- Died: 24 March 1963 (aged 63); Glasgow, Scotland
- Education: University of Glasgow
- Known for: palaeontology one of the first women to be made a Fellow of the Royal Society of Edinburgh first woman to receive Royal Society of Edinburgh Neill Prize
- Awards: Neill Prize (1949); Wollaston Fund
- Scientific career
- Fields: Geology
- Workplaces: Hunterian Museum, Glasgow

Ethel Dobbie Currie FRSE FGS FGSG DSc (4 December 1899 – 24 March 1963) was a Scottish geologist, one of the first women to be made a Fellow of the Royal Society of Edinburgh, and the first woman to receive the Society's Neill Prize (1949).

== Life and career ==
Ethel Dobbie Currie was born at 92 Seymour Street, Cathcart, Glasgow (moving to 81 Seymour Street soon after) on 4 December 1899 to Elizabeth Laughlan Allan and James Ferguson Currie. She was a pupil of Bellahouston Academy. She graduated with a BSc from University of Glasgow in 1920 and her PhD in 1923. From 1920 she was assistant to Dr William Smellie at the Hunterian Museum.

She was also awarded an honorary doctorate (DSc) in 1945.

Currie's primary research interest was in palaeontology. Her first publication was a joint paper with Professor John Gregory on fossil sea-urchins. She led a study of Scottish carboniferous goniatites.

In 1945 she became the first woman to be awarded the Neill Prize by the Royal Society of Edinburgh and in 1949, she was one of the first women to be made a Fellow of the Royal Society of Edinburgh (along with Sheina Marshall). Her proposers were Sir Edward Battersby Bailey, John Weir, Murray Macgregor, Sir Arthur Elijah Trueman, George W. Tyrell and Neville George.

Her contributions were acknowledged by the Geological Society of London and she was awarded its Wollaston Fund.

In 1952 she was elected the first female President of the Glasgow Geological Society, in succession to Neville George. She was succeeded in turn in 1955 by George in a second term of office.

Professor John Gregory invited her to assist with the care and arrangement of the geological collections in the Hunterian Museum after her graduation. She worked as assistant curator of the Museum until she retired in September 1962.

She died in Glasgow on 24 March 1963 from a brain tumour.

== Publications ==
Ethel Currie published three books

- Jurassic and Eocene Echinoidea from Somaliland (Papers from the Geological department. University of Glasgow) (1927)
- Note on rocks from the Sahara collected by Captain D.R.G. Cameron (Papers from the Geological department. Glasgow (1931)
- The vertebrate fossils from the glacial and associated post-glacial beds of Scotland in the Hunterian museum (1928) jointly with J. W. Currie
