= Charles Clough (geologist) =

British geologist and mapmaker

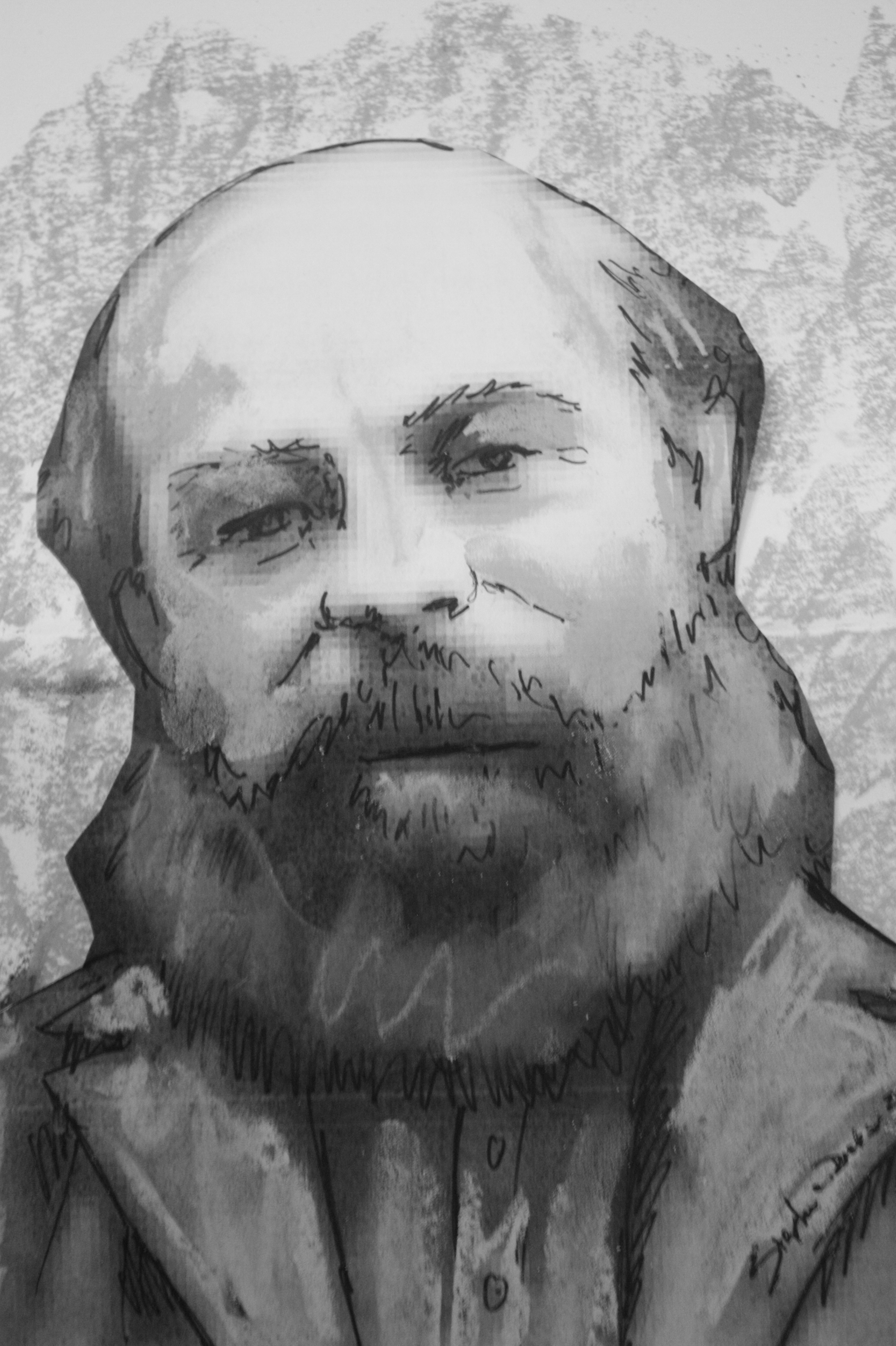
Charles Clough

Charles Thomas Clough MA, LLD, FGS, FRSE (23 December 1852 – 27 August 1916) was a prominent British geologist and mapmaker. The Edinburgh Geological Society named the Clough Medal in his honour.

== Life ==
Charles Clough was born in Huddersfield, the fifth of six children to the lawyer Thomas William Clough and Amelia Jane Ibeson. He attended Rugby School from 1867 to 1871, and in 1871 was accepted at St John's College, Cambridge, to study Natural Sciences. He graduated in 1878 but was working from 1875, being employed as an Assistant Geologist on the national Geological Survey.

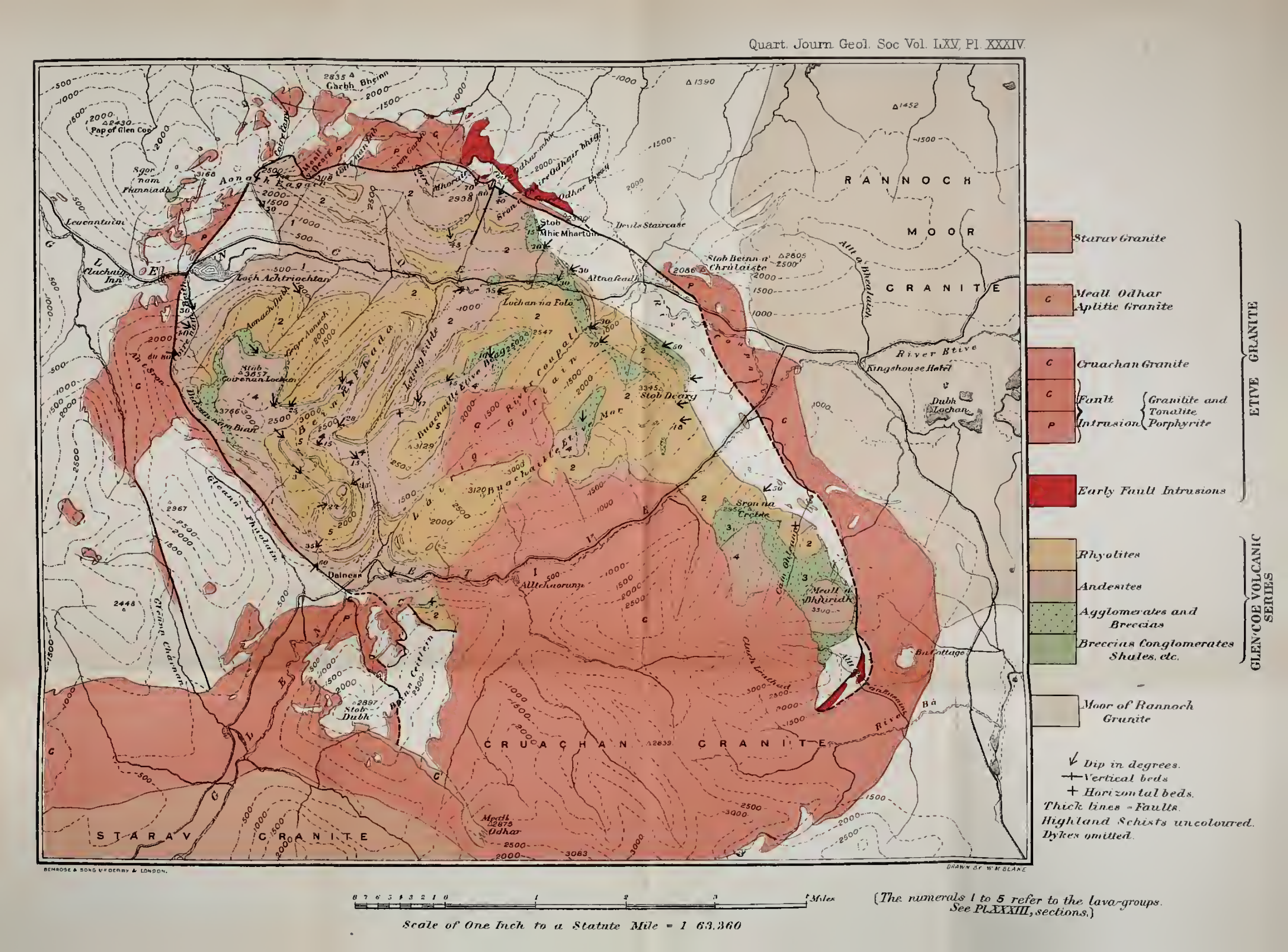
Geological Map of Glen Coe, from Clough (1909)

He initially worked in the Teesdale and Cheviot districts of Northern England, under H.H. Howell. In 1884 he was transferred to the Edinburgh office, in Scotland. Here his fame within his field grew for his work in the North West Highlands and the Hebrides. In 1896 he was promoted to full Geologist and, on the death of William Gunn, in 1902 to District Geologist.

Clough was a teetotaller and vegetarian. He made boots out of vegetable fibre but they were incapable of standing the wear and tear of his work so he had to give up their use.

== Geological Society awards ==
In 1906 the Geological Society of London awarded him the Murchison Medal. In 1908 he was elected President of the Edinburgh Geological Society, a post he held until 1910.

In mid-1916 St Andrews University awarded him an Honorary degree as a Doctor of Laws (LLD). In the same year he was elected Fellow of the Royal Society of Edinburgh, his proposers were John Horne, Benjamin Neeve Peach, Robert Kidston and Sir John Smith Flett.

== Family ==
In 1881 he married Anne Mary Usher, daughter of Thomas Durham Usher. They had a son and two daughters. They lived at St Ann's Mount on Polton, just south of Edinburgh. His wife died in 1935 and was buried with Charles in Lasswade.

== Death ==
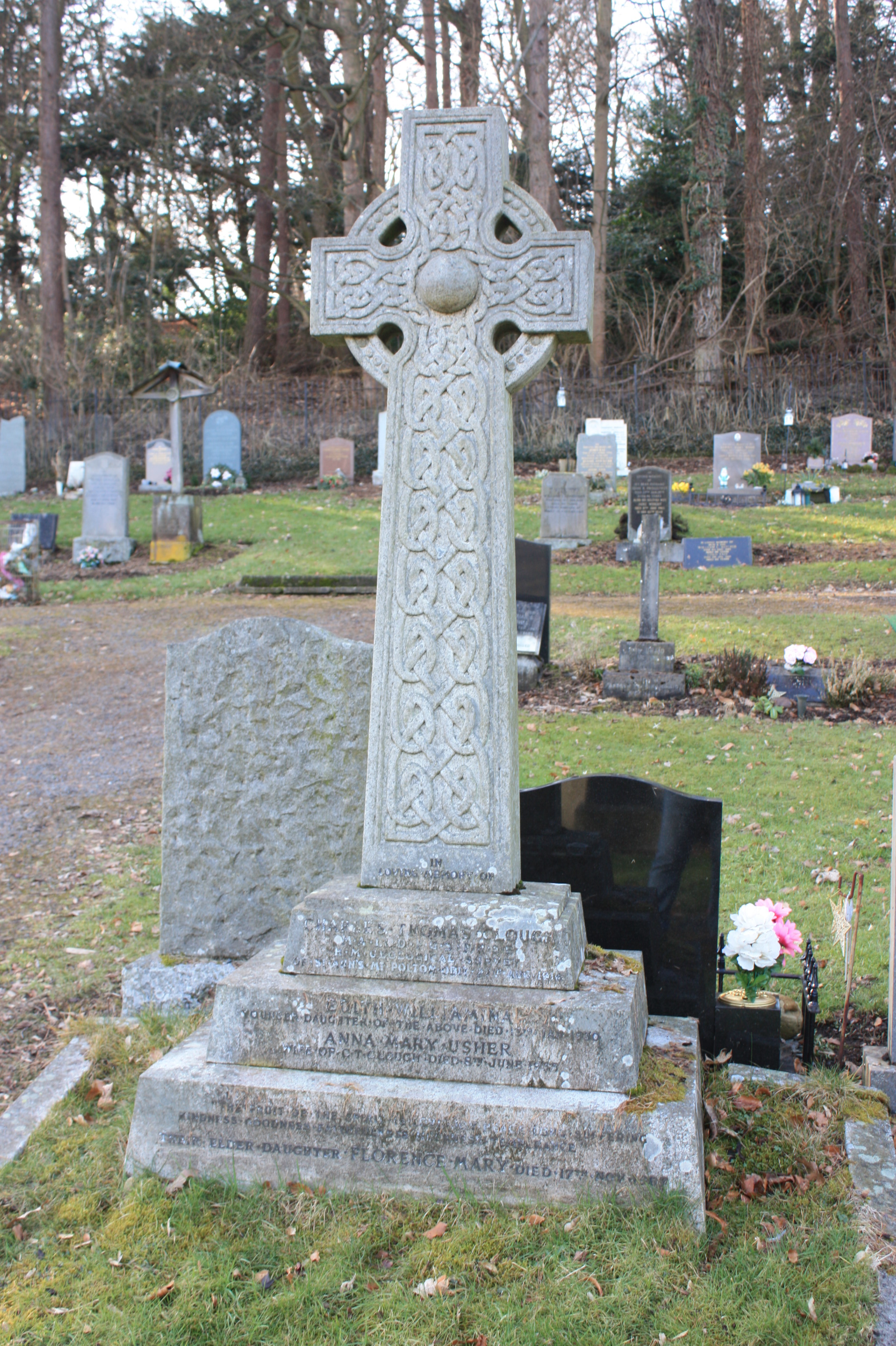
The grave of Charles Thomas Clough, Lasswade Cemetery

On 23 August 1916 Clough was studying rocks in a narrow railway cutting, near Manuel House, south of Bo'ness, Falkirk, when he was struck by a train as he crossed the line and severely injured, necessitating the amputation of both legs, at Edinburgh Infirmary. He died of pneumonia in hospital, four days later, on Sunday 27 August. He was buried on 30 August, near the centre of the western section of Lasswade Cemetery.

== Principal accomplishments ==
- Completion of the one-inch map of England and Wales
- Survey of the Cowal District in western Scotland
- Aiding in the survey of the North-West Highlands
- Survey and Mapping of large areas of Sutherland
- Survey and mapping of Loch Maree.
- Survey of Ross-shire
- Survey of North Argyllshire and Mull
- Survey of the coalfields in the Lothians, Lanarkshire and North Ayrshire
- See

== Published works ==
Clough published several papers on the geology of Scottish coalfields in cooperation with fellow geologist Charles Hawker Dinham. In addition Clough created the following:

- Survey Memoirs: Otterburn and Elsdon (1887)
- English Side of the Cheviot Hills (1888)
- The Geology of Plashetts and Kielder (1889)
- Clough, Charles Thomas; Maufe, Herbert Brantwood; Bailey, Edward Battersby (1909). "The Cauldron-Subsidence of Glen Coe, and the Associated Igneous Phenomena". Quarterly Journal of the Geological Society. 65 (1–4): 611–678. doi:10.1144/gsl.jgs.1909.065.01-04.35. S2CID 129342758.
- The Geology of East Lothian (1910)
- See

== Recognition ==
The Edinburgh Geological Society adds annually to honour the Clough Medal and the biennial Clough Memorial Award. Winners of the medal include:

- 1942/3 – James Livingstone Begg
- 1944/5 – Murray Macgregor
- 1957/8 – John Weir
- 1961/2 – Edward Battersby Bailey
- 1967/8 – Archibald Gordon MacGregor
- 1971/2 – James Phemister
- 1987/8 – William Stuart McKerrow
