= Emily Dix =

British palaeobotanist (1904–1972)

- Born: 21 May 1904
- Died: 31 December 1972 (aged 68)
- Education: University of Wales
- Scientific career
- Fields: Paleobotany
- Workplaces: University College Swansea, University of Wales; Bedford College, University of London
- Thesis: On the correlation of coal seams in South Wales (1933)
- Academic advisors: Arthur Trueman

Emily Dix (21 May 1904 – 31 December 1972) was a British palaeobotanist, specialising in the fossil flora of the Coal Measures.

== Education ==
She was born into a farming family living at Llanrhidian on the Gower Peninsula. At 18 she won a scholarship to University College Swansea where she graduated in 1925 with a first class honours degree in geology. She then went on to study with Arthur Trueman at Swansea, with whom she worked for the next five years on various projects. T. Neville George worked with her on the Coal Measures. She was awarded an M. Sc. in 1926 for work on paleontology in the Coal Measures of the Gwendraeth Valley in South Wales and a DSc.doctorate from the University of Wales in 1933 for a thesis about correlation of coal seams in South Wales. Her research was supported by grants from the government because of its importance to the coal industry.

== Academic career ==
In 1929 Dix was elected a Fellow of the Geological Society. In 1930 she was appointed lecturer in geology at Bedford College in London, where she stayed for the rest of her working life.

Her initial work, following that of Truman, was on non-marine bivalves in the South Wales Coalfield. This remained an interest throughout her working life. Dix's major contribution was to apply Trueman's approach to biostratigraphy to plant fossils.

She presented her work at international conferences including the Second International Carboniferous Congress in Heerlen (the Netherlands) in 1935. In 1936 she was awarded the Murchison Fund by the Geological Society of London for her work on palaeontology and stratigraphy in the Coal Measures that combined flora and faunal evidence, thus improving information about the Upper Carboniferous successions. This information was useful to the coal industry as well as fundamental science.

World War II came at the height of her career, and disrupted her scientific activities. Along with the rest of Bedford College, she was evacuated to Cambridge, leaving behind her collections of fossils and scientific reprints which were later lost through bombing.

Dix's wartime papers were mainly on relatively minor aspects of coal geology (e.g. the presence of boulders in coal seams) and plant biostratigraphy is rarely mentioned. Bedford College returned to London in 1944 and Dix led a field trip of the Geologists' Association to Guildford in June 1945.

== Personal life ==
Towards the end of the war, Dix suffered a mental breakdown which caused the end of her scientific career.

By 1946, her condition had so deteriorated that her sister Margaret had taken over her affairs, and moved Dix to The Retreat mental hospital in York, where she had new experimental surgery called prefrontal leucotomy which was unsuccessful and ruined her ability to ever recover. Her contract with the Bedford College formally expired on 31 December 1947. She was then transferred to St David's Hospital Carmarthen where she remained until her death.

== Legacy ==
Most of her fossils survived and her collection is now divided between the Hunterian Museum in Glasgow, the Amgueddfa Cymru in Cardiff, and the Sedgwick Museum in Cambridge.

== Selected publications ==
She published 40 articles and notes. They included:

- Dix, E. (1934) The sequence of floras in the Upper Carboniferous with special reference to South Wales. Transactions of the Royal Society of Edinburgh. volume 57, pp 789.
- Dix, Emily (1932) On a sporocarp probably attached to a frond of Neuropteris schlehani, Stur. Annals of Botany, Volume 46, Issue 4, 1 October 1932, Pages 1064–1067
- Dix, E. (1931) The flora of the upper part of the Coal Measures of North Staffordshire. Quarterley J. Geological Society, volume 87, 160 - 179.
- Davies, D. F., Dix, E. and Truhman, A. F. (1928) Boreholes in the Cwmgorse Valley. Proc. South Wales Inst. Eng., vol. xliv, pages 37.
- Dix, Emily (1928) Seeds associated with Linopteris munsteri, Eichwald. Annals of Botany, Volume 42, Issue 4, 1 October 1928, Pages 1019–1024
