= John Young (1823–1900) =

Scottish geologist and bryozoologist (1823–1900)

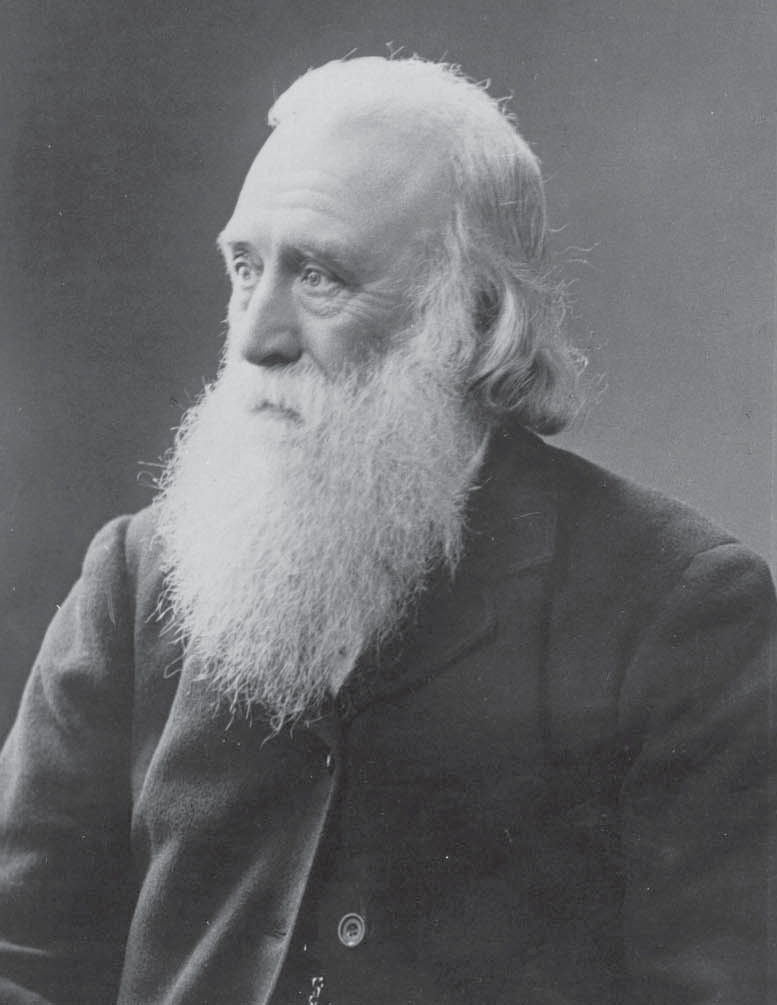
- Born: July 1823; Lennoxtown
- Died: 13 March 1900 (aged 76–77); Troon
- Education: Legum Doctor
- Occupation: Bryozoologist, paleontologist, curator, geologist, naturalist
- Employer: Hunterian Museum and Art Gallery
- Awards: Fellow of the Geological Society of London (1874); The Murchison Fund (1883)

John Young FGS (July 1823 – 13 March 1900) was a Scottish geologist, palaeontologist and a curator at the Hunterian Museum. He was a vice-president of the Glasgow Geological Society and of the Natural History Society of Glasgow, and was awarded both life membership of the Geological Society of London and money from their Murchison Medal Fund. He was made a Doctor of Laws by the University of Glasgow.

He named several taxa, and the species Chitonellus youngianus was named in his honour. Fossil specimens he collected are in the collection of Glasgow Museums.

== Early life ==
Young was born in July 1823 in Lennoxtown, Scotland, to Jean (née Roberston) and Thomas Young, a carpenter. His early career was as a messenger-boy and later apprentice block cutter in the Lennoxtown textile printing mill where his father worked as a foreman joiner. Young worked there for 26 years.

== Career ==
As a boy Young became interested in the fossils of the Campsie Hills. In his history of the Glasgow Geological Society, Murray Macgregor writes:

By 1850 John Young of Campsie district fame had become a recognised authority on local geology

and when the British Association for the Advancement of Science met in Glasgow in 1855, Young was hired to create an exhibition of local fossils.

He was one of the first people elected an Honorary Associate of the Glasgow Geological Society shortly after its foundation in 1858, and was elected a vice-president of the society in October 1859. The society's first publication was his 1860 paper "Geology of the Campsie District". It was revised in 1868 with a third, largely re-written, edition in 1894.

In 1859 Young was appointed assistant curator at the Hunterian Museum, having received the backing of William Thomson, Lord Kelvin and other senior figures in local societies. His work in this role was credited with enabling greater collaboration between the museum and the Glasgow Geological Society.

In 1874 he was awarded life membership of the London Geological Society and in 1883 the Geological Society of London, as it had become known, awarded him the proceeds of the Murchison Medal Fund. In 1877 he was made a vice president of the Natural History Society of Glasgow, having joined in 1852, and been subsequently elected a life member.

The University of Glasgow made him a Doctor of Laws in 1893.

Young is sometimes confused with Professor John Young MD FRSE. (1835–1902), also of Glasgow and a geologist and Hunterian Museum curator, with whom he co-authored papers and named several taxa. Among their contemporaries, Young was referred to as "The Good", and Professor Young as "The Bad". In literature, the distinction is usually between "Mr" and "Professor", or through the professor's "MD" honorific suffix. Professor Young supported his namesake and attempted to have the latter's museum salary raised.

== Personal life and death ==
Young married Margaret Stirling, daughter of Elizabeth (née Downie) and Peter Stirling, in 1847. They had three daughters and four sons. Margaret died aged 47 in 1874.

Young died on 13 March 1900 in Troon, following a stroke. Obituaries were published in Geologistical Magazine, the Quarterly Journal of the Geological Society. and the Glasgow Herald. The latter said:

The museum contains abundant evidence of the knowledge, zeal, and skill which have made its fossil and mineralogical departments objects of interest to men of science everywhere, while the reputation of the University was enhanced by having on its staff one whose work was valued as it was widely known.

== Legacy ==
James Walker Kirkby named the species Chitonellus youngianus after Young, in a paper they co-authored in 1865.

The "John Young (1823-1900) Collection of Carboniferous invertebrates (brachiopods, crinoids, ostracods, corals, bivalves, etc)" was donated to Glasgow Museum by James Tullis in 1901, having formed the basis for the Catalogue of Western Scottish Fossils, compiled for another meeting of the British Association in Glasgow, in 1876.
