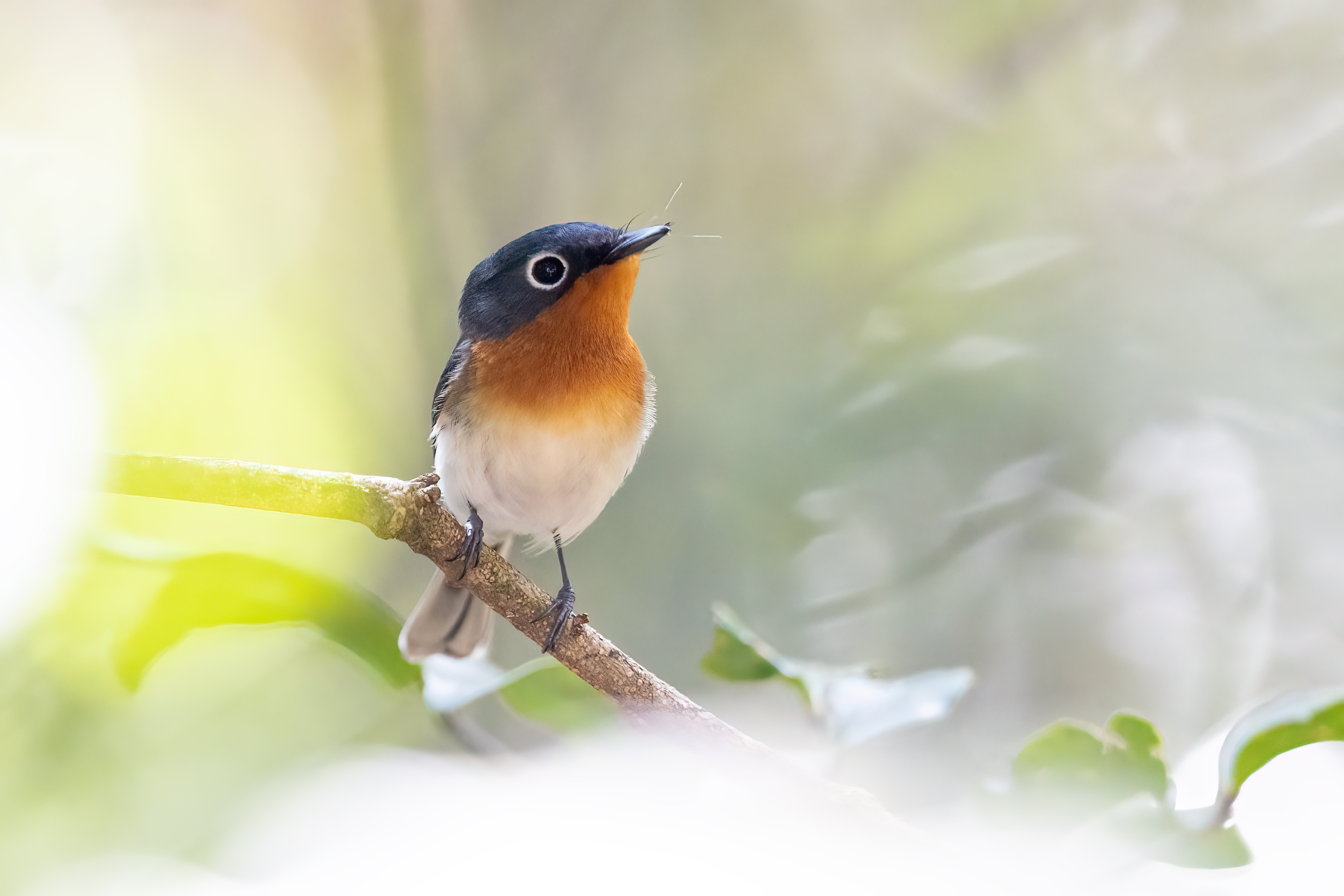
- Female
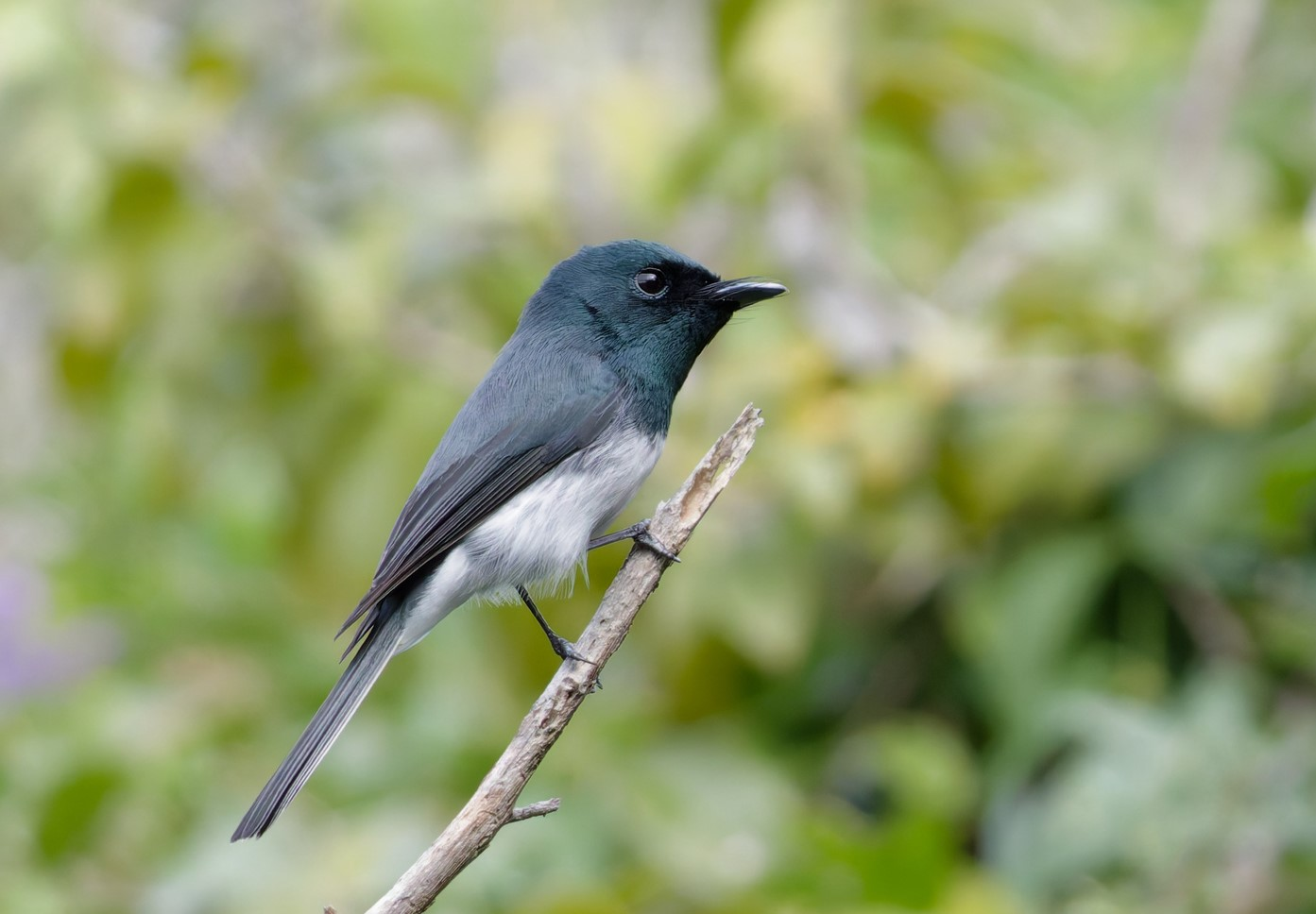
- Male

Conservation status
- Least Concern (IUCN 3.1)

Scientific classification
- Kingdom: Animalia
- Phylum: Chordata
- Class: Aves
- Order: Passeriformes
- Family: Monarchidae
- Genus: Myiagra
- Species: M. caledonica

Binomial name
- Myiagra caledonica Bonaparte, 1857

Subspecies
- See text

= Melanesian flycatcher =

Species of bird

The Melanesian flycatcher (Myiagra caledonica) is a species of bird in the monarch-flycatcher family Monarchidae. The species is found on islands in Melanesia.

== Taxonomy and systematics ==
It is closely related to the Vanikoro flycatcher. Alternate names for the Melanesian flycatcher include broad-billed flycatcher, Caledonian flycatcher, Caledonian Myiagra flycatcher, Melanesian broadbill, Melanesian Myiagra, New Caledonian flycatcher and New Caledonian Myiagra flycatcher. The alternate name "broad-billed flycatcher" should not be confused with the species of the same name, Myiagra ruficollis.

=== Subspecies ===
Five subspecies are recognized:

- M. c. caledonica - Bonaparte, 1857: Found on New Caledonia
- M. c. viridinitens - Gray, GR, 1859: Originally described as a separate species. Found on the Loyalty Islands
- M. c. melanura - Gray, GR, 1860: Originally described as a separate species. Found on southern Vanuatu
- M. c. marinae - Salomonsen, 1934: Found on northern and central Vanuatu
- M. c. occidentalis - Mayr, 1931: Originally described as a subspecies of the Vanikoro flycatcher. Found on Rennell Island (south-eastern Solomon Islands)

== Description ==
The species is 13 to 14 cm (5.1–5.5 in) long and weighs 10 to 12 g (0.35–0.42 oz). The plumage is sexually dimorphic, with the male having glossy blue-black feathers and a white underbelly, whilst the female has dark feathers and a red throat, along with a white eye-ring.
