= John Pringle (geologist) =

Scottish geologist and palaeontologist

Dr John Pringle FRSE FGS (21 October 1877–2 August 1948) was a Scottish geologist who won the Geological Society of London's Lyell Medal in 1938.

== Life ==
He was born in Selkirk on 21 October 1877 and studied geology at Heriot Watt College in Edinburgh, graduating around 1900.

From 1901 he worked for HM Geological Survey, initially as a fossil collector. In 1913 he became Assistant Palaeontologist to the Survey.

The University of Wales awarded him an honorary doctorate (DSc) in 1931. In 1932 he was elected a Fellow of the Royal Society of Edinburgh. His proposers were Murray Macgregor, James Ernest Richey, James Phemister and Robert Campbell.

In 1934 he became the official Palaeontologist to the Survey. In 1935, he published British Regional Geology: The South of Scotland. He retired in 1937 and died on 2 August 1948.
