= William Smellie (geologist) =

Scottish geologist

William Robert Smellie FRSE (16.11.1885-14.03.1973) was a 20th-century Scottish geologist. He was curator of the Hunterian Museum in Glasgow from 1914.

== Life ==
He graduated MA BSc from Glasgow University in 1911.

From 1911 he was a demonstrator in geology at Glasgow University. There he began assisting Prof John Walter Gregory at the university's Hunterian Museum and replaced him as curator in 1914. He was absent for war duties 1916–1917, serving in the Royal Garrison Artillery until he was invalided out. In 1920 he was joined by Ethel Currie as his assistant.

In 1919–1920 he described a previously unidentified species of echinoid in Gilan province, sending specimens home to the Hunterian.

In 1920 he was elected a Fellow of the Royal Society of Edinburgh. His proposers were John Walter Gregory, George Walter Tyrrell, Frederick Orpen Bower and John Horne.

In the 1930s he became official geologist to the Anglo-Persian Oil Company and was responsible for finding new oil fields in the Persian Gulf. In the 1920s he surveyed Somaliland.

He died on 14 March 1973.

== Publication ==
- Igneous Rocks of Bute
