= William Flett =

William Flett may refer to:

- William H. Flett, member of the Wisconsin State Assembly
- William Robertson Flett, Canadian politician
- William Roberts Flett, Scottish geologist and author
- Bill Flett, Canadian ice hockey player
