= James Livingstone Begg =

Scottish geologist

James Livingstone Begg FRSE FGS JP
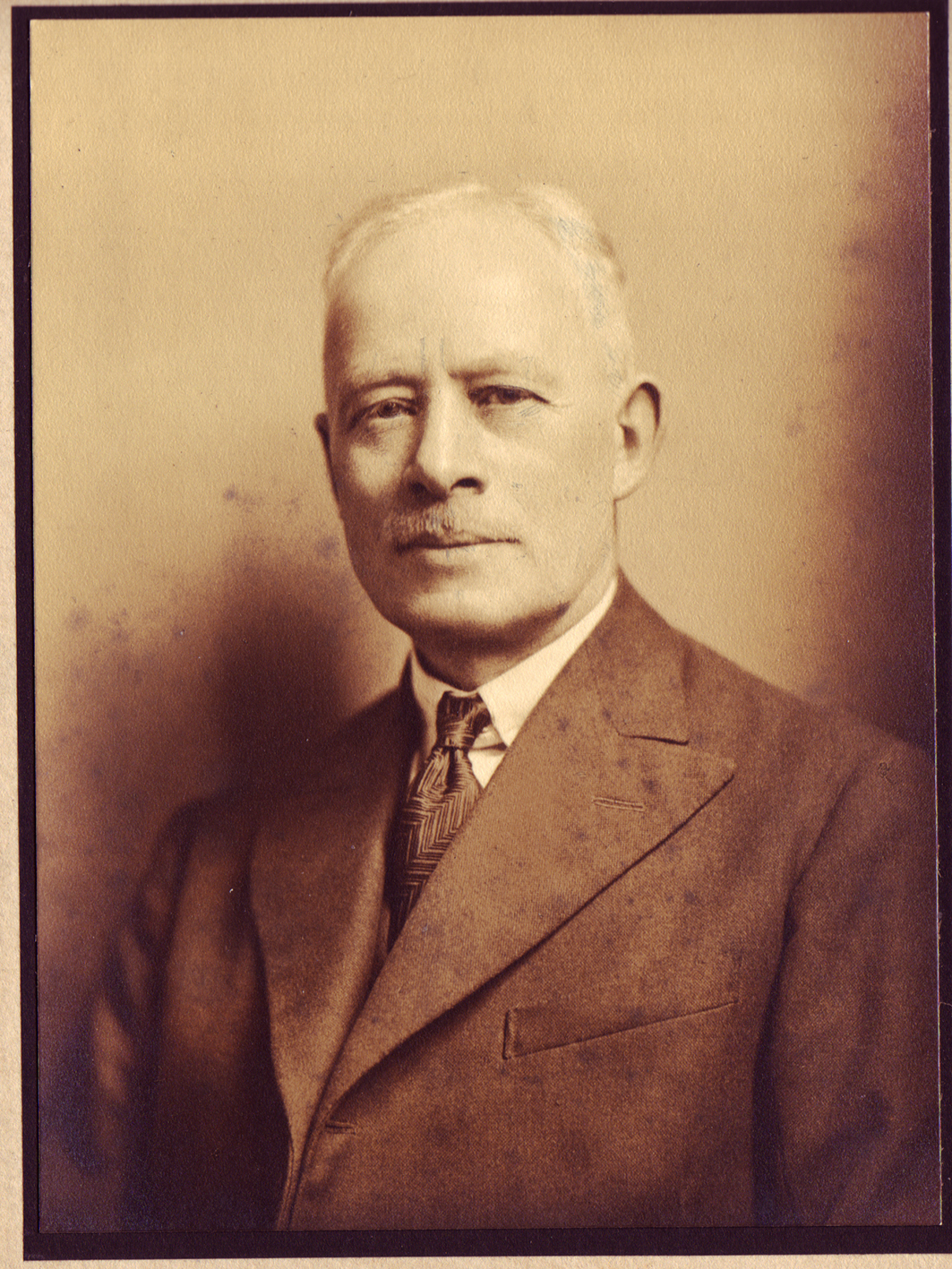
- James Begg c.1935
- Born: 14 September 1874; Dennistoun, Scotland
- Died: 11 August 1958 (aged 83)
- Awards: FGS (1930); FRSE (1933); Clough Medal (1942); Wollaston Fund (1946)
- Honours: President Geological Society of Glasgow 1935; Honorary Life Member Geological Society of Glasgow 1948

James Livingstone Begg FGS FRSE JP (14 September 1874 – 11 August 1958) was a Scottish geologist, paleontologist and artist, awarded the Clough Medal in 1942 and recipient of the Wollaston Fund in 1946. Begg was President of the Geological Society of Glasgow from 1935 to 1938.

== Life ==
James Begg was born in Dennistoun in Glasgow in 1874 and educated at Garnethill School. He trained as an artist in Paris for three years and his paintings were accepted for exhibition in Glasgow, Edinburgh and Liverpool between 1896 and 1909 at the Glasgow Institute of the Fine Arts, the Royal Scottish Academy, the Royal Scottish Society of Painters in Watercolour and the Walker Art Gallery. Begg was employed in his father's business as a house factor and property agent in Glasgow, becoming a partner in 1917.

Geology became his passion. He studied the subject at extramural evening classes run by Glasgow University, joining the Geological Society of Glasgow in 1905. He was elected to its council in 1910. He was elected Fellow of the Geological Society of London in 1930 and Fellow of the Royal Society of Edinburgh in 1933. He was elected President of the Geological Society of Glasgow from 1935 to 1938. Begg was awarded the Clough Medal by the Edinburgh Geological Society in 1942 for his significant contribution to Scottish geological research. He was awarded the Wollaston Fund by the Geological Society of London in 1946 in recognition of his published work particularly in the Transactions of the Geological Society of Glasgow and Geological Magazine. In 1948 Begg was elected Honorary Life Member of the Geological Society of Glasgow in recognition of his long standing service. Begg enjoyed painting watercolours and produced detailed illustrations of his geological specimens. His large fossil collection, specialising in Trilobites, was acquired by Glasgow University's Hunterian Museum and is known as the Begg Collection.

James Begg was also a Justice of the Peace for the County of Lanark. He died on 11 August 1958.

== Family ==
His father Thomas Begg was a master builder. In 1917 he married Jean Hepburn. His son, Tom Begg (1919–1941), a Gunner in the Royal Artillery, was killed in action 16 June 1941 during the Siege of Tobruk in the North African campaign of World War II. He had two daughters, Catherine (1923–1993) and Nita Begg (1920–2011), who was an artist. His grandson Tom Begg is a councillor on the Renfrewshire local authority.
