= William Smellie =

William Smellie may refer to:

- William Smellie (encyclopedist) (1740–1795), Scottish encyclopedist
- William Smellie (obstetrician) (1697–1763), obstetrician and the "father of British midwifery"
- William Smellie (geologist) (1885–1973), Scottish geologist
