= Robert Craigie Cross =

British philosopher (1911–2000)

RObert Craigie Cross FRSE CBE
- Born: 24 April 1911; Glasgow, Scotland
- Died: 13 September 2000 (aged 89); Edinburgh, Scotland
- Spouse: Peggy Catherine Elizabeth Vernon (m. 1943)
- Children: 2

Academic background
- Education: University of Glasgow; Queen's College, Oxford

Robert Craigie Cross FRSE CBE (1911–2000) was Regius Professor of Logic at Aberdeen University. He served as vice principal of the university from 1974 to 1978.

== Life ==
Robert Craigie Cross was born in Glasgow on 24 April 1911, the son of Matthew Cross, a schoolmaster, and Margaret Dickson. He grew up in Dunbartonshire. He attended Glasgow University and graduated in 1932, winning the David Logan Medal for the most distinguished arts graduate. He was awarded the Foulis Scholarship and used this to attend Queen's College, Oxford where he studied "Mods and Greats" under Sir Oliver Franks, focusing on philosophy and ancient history. In 1938 he became a fellow at the college and began to tutor in philosophy. He was a recipient of the David Logan Medal for the most distinguished arts graduate and the Foulis Scholarship to Queen's College, Oxford.

Working in tandem with Wladek Bednarowski, he helped redirect the courses in logic and philosophy. There was a renewed emphasis on common sense and painstaking analysis, which typified Oxford philosophy.

Plato's Republic was his premier philosophical work. It rendered its study "accessible and illuminating." It became a standard text for students.

During World War II he served with distinction as secretary of the Shipbuilding Trades Joint Council and the Admiralty Industrial Council, revealing administrative and diplomatic talents.

After the war he returned to Oxford University until 1953, when he transferred to a chair, as Regius Professor of Logic, at Aberdeen University, where he then rose to be vice principal. While teaching Aberdeen undergraduates, he helped to make more popular philosophy classes. "At the end of the 1950s Aberdeen differed from other Scottish universities, all of which had some philosophy compulsion, in the greater popularity, with considerably larger classes, of logic and metaphysics over moral philosophy. Cross's presence made a substantial contribution to that popularity." From 1965 to 1975 he served on the University Grants Committee.

He was made a Commander of the Order of the British Empire (CBE) in 1972. He was elected a Fellow of the Royal Society of Edinburgh in 1977. His proposers were Edward Maitland Wright, Reginald Victor Jones, Edwin Mervyn Patterson, George M Burnett, and Sir Thomas Malcolm Knox.

He retired in 1978 and moved to the Scottish Borders. He died in Edinburgh on 13 September 2000.

== Family ==
In 1943 he married Peggy Catherine Elizabeth Vernon. They had two daughters.

== Publications ==
- Plato's Republic: A Philosophical Commentary (1964) co-written with Anthony Douglas Woozley
