= Charles Hawker Dinham =

British geologist, cartographer and author

Charles Hawker Dinham BA FRSE (1883-1955) was a British geologist, cartographer and author of numerous scientific textbooks. He did much joint work with Charles Thomas Clough. He worked in both England and Scotland in the early 20th century. He made meticulous 6-inch maps of many areas of Great Britain.

== Life ==
He was born on 7 July 1883, to Charles Dinham (1846-1895) and Beatrice Mary Pike (1858-1938) They lived at 33 Broadhurst Gardens in Hampstead. His paternal grandmother was the sister of Rev Robert Stephen Hawker. He was head boy at Hailebury.

Little is known of his life but he appears to have studied Classics and then Geology (Natural Science) at Magdalen College, Oxford under Robert Gunther, in whose papers (folio 263) Dinham is described as "commoner, 1902-1906". In 1908 he is listed as a Member of the Geological Society of London. In June 1910 he was appointed Geologist on the Geological Survey of Great Britain by the Board of Education (a senior civil servant position). This position was under the direction of John Horne and Ben Peach. On joining the survey he was initially charged with investigating the metamorphic rocks of Sutherland and on the Midland Valley coalfields. In 1922 he was made District Geologist for the Fife and Kinross district with special focus on coal in this area.

In 1924 he was elected a Fellow of the Royal Society of Edinburgh his proposers were fellow-geologists John Horne, Ben Peach, Walcot Gibson and Thomas John Jehu. He resigned from the Society in 1945.

In 1927 his survey work was transferred from Scotland to England in charge of the Midlands and Cambridge unit. During the Second World War he oversaw the ensuring of water supply to East Anglia.

He Married Mary Evelyn Graham, and they had 3 children: John Hawker Dinham, Ann Beatrice Dinham and Hillary Mary Dinham.

He died suddenly on 15 February 1955.

== Publications ==
- Potash-Felspar-Phosphate of Lime (1917)
- The Geology of Strath Oykell and Lower Loch Shin (1926) co-written with Murray Macgregor
- The Economic Geology of the Stirling and Clackmannan Coalfield (1932)
- Geology of the County around Huntingdon and Biggleswade (1965)
