= Brian Bluck =

Geologist (1935–2015)

Brian Bluck FRSE FGS
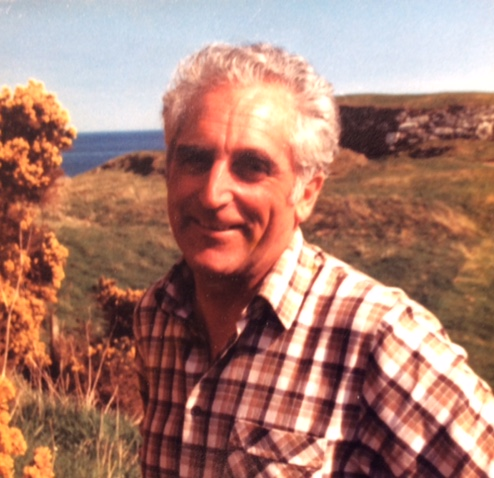
- Brian Bluck on the west coast of Scotland during the 1990s.
- Born: Brian John Bluck; 29 August 1935; Pyle, Wales
- Died: 19 June 2015 (aged 79); Old Kilpatrick, Scotland
- Citizenship: British
- Education: University College, Swansea; University of Glasgow
- Known for: Sedimentology
- Scientific career
- Fields: Geology
- Doctoral advisor: Gilbert Kelling; Dick Owen

Brian John Bluck FRSE FGS (29 August 1935 – 29 June 2015) was a Welsh geologist, academic author and professor of sedimentation and tectonics at the University of Glasgow. He was known for his work in sedimentology.

== Early life and education ==
Bluck was born in Pyle, Wales, on 29 August 1935 to a working-class family. He attended Bridgend County Grammar School and while at Cardiff Technical College, he was initially attracted towards politics. However, due to the location of his upbringing amongst Wales' coal mines and limestone landscapes, he decided to study geology at University College in Swansea.

== Career ==
=== University of Illinois ===
In 1961, Bluck successfully applied for a postdoctoral position at the University of Illinois after being encouraged to do so by Professor Frank Rhodes. It was at this time that Bluck began his interest in coarse clastic sediment after being persuaded by Paul Potter to work on modern alluvial fans in Death Valley, Nevada.

=== University of Glasgow ===
In 1963, Bluck was appointed as an assistant lecturer in Geology at the University of Glasgow. In 1965 he became a lecturer, then a senior lecturer and reader, before finally becoming a professor in 1989. In 1985, he was the recipient of a DSc by the University of Glasgow and later was made Emeritus Professor in Sedimentation and Tectonics upon his retirement.

Bluck was an Honorary Senior Research Fellow in the Department of Geographical and Earth Sciences.

He was on the editorial boards of the Journal of Sedimentary Petrology, Scottish Journal of Geology, and the Transactions of the Royal Society of Edinburgh.

== Awards ==
Throughout his career, Bluck was the recipient of the following awards:

- Geological Society of London Lyell Fund (1981)
- Royal Society of Edinburgh Keith Medal (1981)
- Saltire Society of Scotland Award (1991)
- Edinburgh Geological Society Clough Medal (1999/2000)
- Elected FRSE in 1981

=== Brian Bluck Medal ===
The University of Glasgow issued a medal in memory of Bluck, the Brian Bluck Medal. The medal and monetary prize is awarded to the best performing student in Earth Science honours.

== Personal life and death ==
Bluck was married to Mary, who together had two children. Bluck died on 29 June 2015, at his home in Old Kilpatrick.

== Academic works ==
Bluck has helped to produce 82 publications in his geological career. An inventory of publications he was involved with from January 2000 to September 2010 are listed below:

- Old Red Sandstone basins and alluvial systems of Midland Scotland (January 2000)
- Caledonian and related events in Scotland (January 2000)
- Where ignorance is bliss 'tis a folly to be wise' (Thomas Gray 1716-1761) - Controversy in the basement blocks of Scotland (November 2000)
- Detrial muscovite 40Ar/39Ar ages from Carboniferous sandstones of the British Isles: Provenance and implications for the uplift history of orogenic belts (April 2001)
- Timing of deposition, orogenesis and glaciation within the Dalradian rocks of Scotland: Constraints from U-Pb zircon ages (January 2002)
- The making of a diamond mega-placer on the margin of the Kalahari craton: Guidelines for future prospecting (August 2003)
- Zircon growth in slate (March 2004)
- Diamond mega-placers: Southern Africa and the Kaapvaal craton in a global context (January 2005)
- Geochronology of a granitoid boulder from the Corsewall Formation (Southern Uplands): Implications for the evolution of southern Scotland (April 2006)
- Characteristics of diamondiferous Plio-Pleistocene littoral deposits within the palaeo-Orange River mouth, Namibia (May 2006)
- Some observations on diamondiferous bedrock gully trapsites on Late Cainozoic, marine-cut platforms of the Sperrgebiet, Namibia (May 2006)
- Structure and directional properties of some valley sandur deposits in southern Iceland (June 2006)
- The effects of fluctuating base-level on the structure of alluvial-fan associated fan-delta deposits – an example from the Tertiary-of-the-Betic-Cordillera, Spain (June 2006)
- The sedimentary history of some Triassic conglomerates in the Vale of Glamorgan, South Wales (June 2006)
- The Orange River, southern Africa: An extreme example of a wave-dominated sediment dispersal system in the South Atlantic Ocean (March 2007)
- Anomalies on the Cambro-Ordovician passive margin of Scotland (December 2007)
- Evolution of a Strike-Slip Fault-Controlled Basin, Upper Old Red Sandstone, Scotland (April 2009)
- Structure of gravel beaches and their relationship to tidal range (September 2010)
