= William Stuart McKerrow =

- Born: 28 June 1922; Glasgow
- Died: 12 June 2004; Oxford
- Known for: Leading expert on the Palaeozoic
- Spouse: Jean Kirstine Stark Brown
- Awards: Distinguished Service Cross DSc (Oxon) Fourmarier Prize
- Scientific career
- Institutions: University of Oxford
- Thesis: Variation in the Terebratulacea of the Fuller's Earth Rock
- Doctoral advisor: William Joscelyn Arkell

William Stuart McKerrow (28 June 1922, Glasgow – 12 June 2004, Oxford) was a British geologist and palaeontologist, known as a leading expert on the Palaeozoic.

== Biography ==
After primary school education at The Glasgow Academy, W. Stuart McKerrow became a boarding student at Derbyshire's Abbotsholme School, where he received his secondary school education. He matriculated in 1940 at the University of Glasgow and there in 1941 studied radio science. From 1942 to 1945 he served in the Royal Navy. He joined the Navy as a sub-lieutenant assigned to convey escort duties in the North Atlantic. He served as an expert in high-frequency direction-finding of enemy submarines. In an Atlantic gale, he repaired a faulty radio receiver. He was awarded the UK's Distinguished Service Cross in 1943 and was demobilised with the rank of lieutenant in November 1945.

McKerrow returned to the University of Glasgow and graduated there in 1947 with a degree in geology. He was appointed a departmental demonstrator in the geology department of the University of Oxford and was eventually promoted to lecturer. He was employed at the University of Oxford as a lecturer, tutor, supervisor of research, and leader of geological field excursions. In 1953 he graduated from the University of Oxford as a Doctor of Philosophy. His doctoral thesis, with advisor William Joscelyn Arkell, is entitled Variation in the Terebratulacea of the Fuller's Earth Rock. During the late 1950s McKerrow began collaborating with geologists in the US and Canada and became an expert on the geological links across the Atlantic during the Palaeozoic. He was a research fellow at Caltech for the academic year 1964–1965 and a visiting scientist at the University Chicago in 1973, in 1977, and 1981, at the University of Alberta in 1984, and at Williams College in 1991. He also spent some time at the University of Auckland. Throughout his career at Oxford and during an active retirement, he did research on the local geology in the Cotswolds and Oxfordshire. In 1989 he retired from the University of Oxford – during his career there he had nearly 30 research students. He became a fellow of Wolfson College, Oxford and eventually vicegerent of the college.

During the 1960s and 1970s he did research on the geology of south-west Ireland, the Southern Uplands of Scotland, and Newfoundland. Later in his career he published research on paleoecology and continental redistribution. He was the author or co-author of about 120 scientific articles. He was the editor of the book The Ecology of Fossils: An Illustrated Guide (1978, M.I.T. Press) and the co-editor, with Christopher R. Scotese, of the book Palaeozoic Palaeogeography and Biogeography (1990, Geological Society of London). With F. Brian Atkins (1937–2013), he published Isle of Arran: A Field Guide for Students of Geology (1989, Geologists' Association).

McKerrow was a strong advocate for the preservation of Kirtlington Quarry for use by scientists and the general public. He served as an Elder of the Presbyterian Church and often preached at St Columba's United Reformed Church, Oxford.

He was a founding member of the Palaeontological Association and served as its president from 1970 to 1972. In 1978 the University of Oxford awarded him a Doctorate in Science. In 1995 the Royal Academy of Belgium awarded him the Fourmarier Prize. He was awarded in 1981 the Geological Society of London's Lyell Medal, in 1988 the Edinburgh Geological Society's Clough Medal, and in 1998 the Geological Society of Glasgow's T. Neville George Medal.

In 1949 he married Jean Kirstine Stark Brown, a Glasgow native with a degree in domestic science from The Queen's College in Glasgow. They first met in Portsmouth during WW II. The couple had three sons and three grandchildren.

=== Articles ===
- McKerrow, W. S. (1962). "The Chronology of Caledonian Folding in the British Isles". Proceedings of the National Academy of Sciences. 48 (11): 1905–1913. Bibcode:1962PNAS...48.1905M. doi:10.1073/pnas.48.11.1905. PMC 221094. PMID 16591015.
- Dewey, J. F.; McKerrow, W. S.; Moorbath, S. (1970). "The relationship between isotopic ages, uplift and sedimentation during Ordovician times in western Ireland". Scottish Journal of Geology. 6 (2): 133–145. Bibcode:1970ScJG....6..133D. doi:10.1144/sjg06020133. S2CID 128675903.
- McKerrow, William Stuart (1971). "Palaeontological prospects—the use of fossils in stratigraphy". Journal of the Geological Society. 127 (5): 455–464. Bibcode:1971JGSoc.127..455M. doi:10.1144/gsjgs.127.5.0455. S2CID 131170921.
- McKerrow, W. S.; Ziegler, A. M. (1972). "Palaeozoic Oceans". Nature Physical Science. 240 (100): 92–94. Bibcode:1972NPhS..240...92M. doi:10.1038/physci240092b0.
- McKerrow, W. S.; Cocks, L. R. M. (1976). "Progressive faunal migration across the Iapetus Ocean". Nature. 263 (5575): 304–306. Bibcode:1976Natur.263..304M. doi:10.1038/263304a0. S2CID 4239117.
- Lambert, R. St. J.; McKerrow, W. S. (1976). "The Grampian Orogeny". Scottish Journal of Geology. 12 (4): 271–292. Bibcode:1976ScJG...12..271L. doi:10.1144/sjg12040271. S2CID 140580982.
- McKerrow, W. S.; Leggett, J. K.; Eales, M. H. (1977). "Imbricate thrust model of the Southern Uplands of Scotland". Nature. 267 (5608): 237–239. Bibcode:1977Natur.267..237M. doi:10.1038/267237a0. S2CID 4195901.
- Ziegler, A. M.; Scotese, C. R.; McKerrow, W. S.; Johnson, M. E.; Bambach, R. K. (1979). "Paleozoic Paleogeography". Annual Review of Earth and Planetary Sciences. 7: 473–502. Bibcode:1979AREPS...7..473Z. doi:10.1146/annurev.ea.07.050179.002353.
- McKerrow, W. S. (1979). "Ordovician and Silurian changes in sea level". Journal of the Geological Society. 136 (2): 137–144. doi:10.1144/gsjgs.136.2.0137. S2CID 131234967.
- Leggett, J. K.; McKerrow, W. S.; Eales, M. H. (1979). "The Southern Uplands of Scotland: A Lower Palaeozoic accretionary prism". Journal of the Geological Society. 136 (6): 755–770. Bibcode:1979JGSoc.136..755L. doi:10.1144/gsjgs.136.6.0755. S2CID 129872215.
- Leggett, J. K.; McKerrow, W. S.; Cocks, L. R. M.; Rickards, R. B. (1981). "Periodicity in the early Palaeozoic marine realm". Journal of the Geological Society. 138 (2): 167–176. Bibcode:1981JGSoc.138..167L. doi:10.1144/gsjgs.138.2.0167. S2CID 130928682.
- Scotese, C.R.; McKerrow, W. S. (1990). "Revised World maps and introduction". Geological Society, London, Memoirs. 12: 1–21. doi:10.1144/gsl.mem.1990.012.01.01. S2CID 128779205.
- McKerrow, W. S.; Scotese, C. R.; Brasier, M. D. (1992). "Early Cambrian continental reconstructions". Journal of the Geological Society. 149 (4): 599–606. Bibcode:1992JGSoc.149..599M. doi:10.1144/gsjgs.149.4.0599. S2CID 129389099.
- Tucker, R. D.; McKerrow, W.S. (1995). "Early Paleozoic chronology: A review in light of new U – Pb zircon ages from Newfoundland and Britain". Canadian Journal of Earth Sciences. 32 (4): 368–379. Bibcode:1995CaJES..32..368T. doi:10.1139/e95-032.
- Torsvik, T.; Smethurst, M.; Meert, J.; Vandervoo, R.; McKerrow, W.; Brasier, M.; Sturt, B.; Walderhaug, H. (1996). "Continental break-up and collision in the Neoproterozoic and Palaeozoic — A tale of Baltica and Laurentia". Earth-Science Reviews. 40 (3–4): 229–258. Bibcode:1996ESRv...40..229T. doi:10.1016/0012-8252(96)00008-6.
- Cocks, L. R. M.; McKerrow, W. S.; Van Staal, C. R. (1997). "The margins of Avalonia". Geological Magazine. 134 (5): 627–636. Bibcode:1997GeoM..134..627C. doi:10.1017/S0016756897007425. S2CID 130769330.
- Van Staal, C. R.; Dewey, J. F.; Niocaill, C. Mac; McKerrow, W. S. (1998). "The Cambrian-Silurian tectonic evolution of the northern Appalachians and British Caledonides: History of a complex, west and southwest Pacific-type segment of Iapetus". Geological Society, London, Special Publications. 143 (1): 197–242. Bibcode:1998GSLSP.143..197V. doi:10.1144/GSL.SP.1998.143.01.17. S2CID 129524874.
- Scotese, C.R.; Boucot, A.J.; McKerrow, W.S. (1999). "Gondwanan palaeogeography and pal˦oclimatology". Journal of African Earth Sciences. 28 (1): 99–114. Bibcode:1999JAfES..28...99S. doi:10.1016/S0899-5362(98)00084-0.
- McKerrow, W. S.; Mac Niocaill, C.; Ahlberg, P. E.; Clayton, G.; Cleal, C. J.; Eagar, R. M. C. (2000). "The Late Palaeozoic relations between Gondwana and Laurussia". Geological Society, London, Special Publications. 179 (1): 9–20. Bibcode:2000GSLSP.179....9M. doi:10.1144/gsl.sp.2000.179.01.03. S2CID 129789533.
