= John Weir (geologist) =

Scottish geologist and palaeontologist

John ("Jim") Weir FRSE FGS (1896 – 1978) was a 20th-century Scottish geologist and palaeontologist.

== Life ==
Weir was born in Glasgow in 1896 and was educated at Woodside Secondary School.

He served in the 51st Highland Division in the First World War. He was wounded in action three times and invalided out of the army in 1918. His main actions and wounds were received at High Wood, Arras and the main German counter-attack of 1918. His lungs were damaged by a gas attack in the latter.

He studied Science at University of Glasgow specialising in geology and mining, graduating MA in 1920 and gaining his first doctorate (PhD) in 1925. He began as a Demonstrator in the university in 1921 and became a Lecturer in Palaeontology in 1923.

In 1934 he was elected a Fellow of the Royal Society of Edinburgh. His proposers were Edward Battersby Bailey, George Tyrrell, Sir John Graham Kerr, John Walton and John Pringle.

In 1941 he succeeded Arthur Trueman as President of the Glasgow Geological Society. He was succeeded in turn in 1944 by Benjamin Barrett. He was awarded the Murchison Fund by the Geological Society for 1941.

In 1949 he began lecturing in Geology instead of Palaeontology. He retired 1962.

He died on 29 January 1978.

== Family ==
He was father to John Anthony Weir (1932-2002) also a geologist.

== Publications ==
- Jurassic Fossils from Jubaland, East Africa (1929)
- Shells of the Coal Measures (1950)
