= Henry Darwin Rogers =

American geologist (1808–1866)

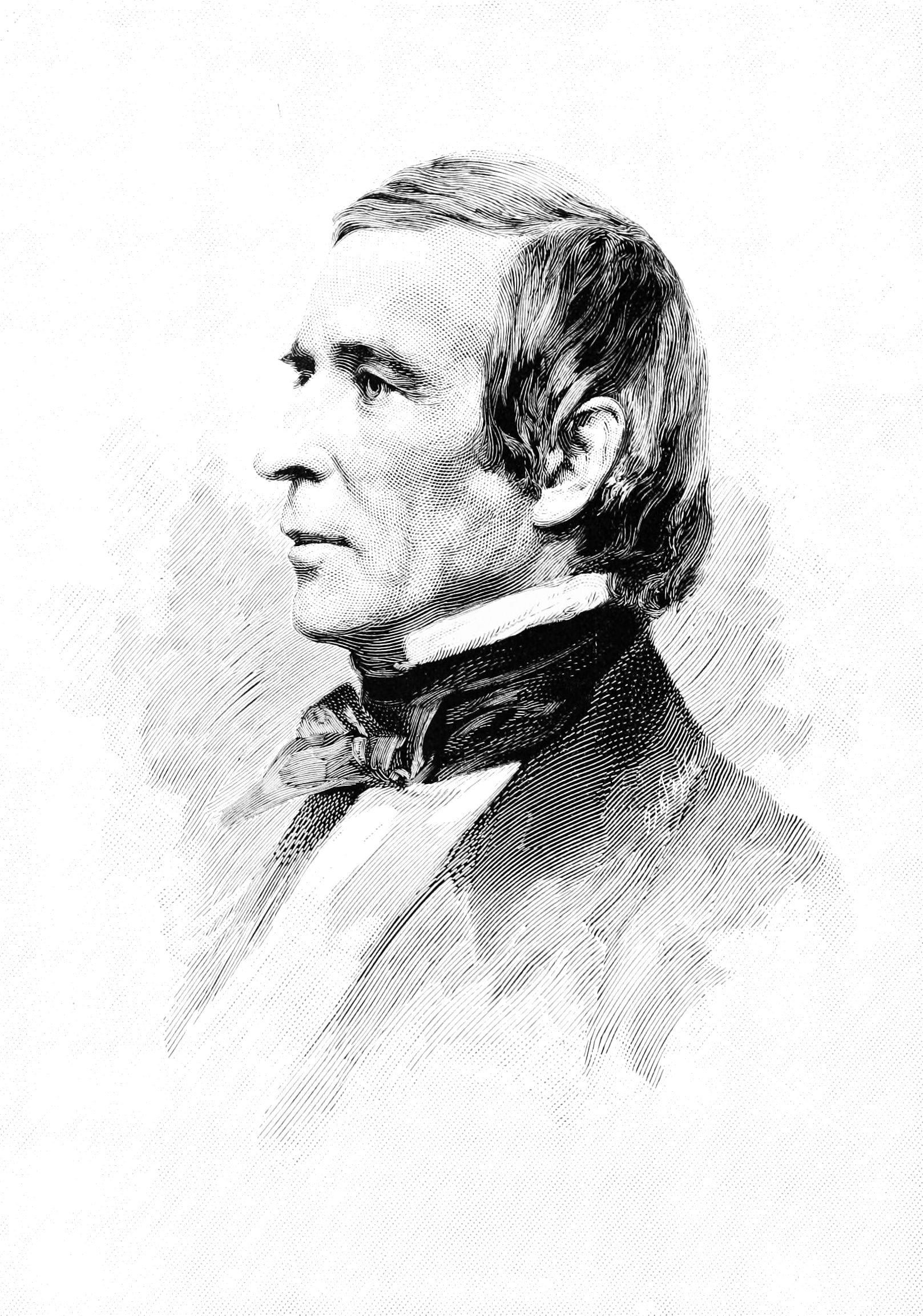
- Born: 1 August 1808; Philadelphia, Pennsylvania
- Died: 26 May 1866 (aged 57); Glasgow, Scotland
- Citizenship: United States
- Scientific career
- Fields: geology
- Workplaces: Professor of Chemistry & Natural Philosophy, Dickinson College (1829); Surveyed geology of New Jersey and Pennsylvania; Professor of Geology, Philadelphia University; Professor of Natural History, Glasgow University (1857–66)

Notes
- Fellow of the Royal Society of Edinburgh (1856); Fellow of the Royal Society of London (1858)

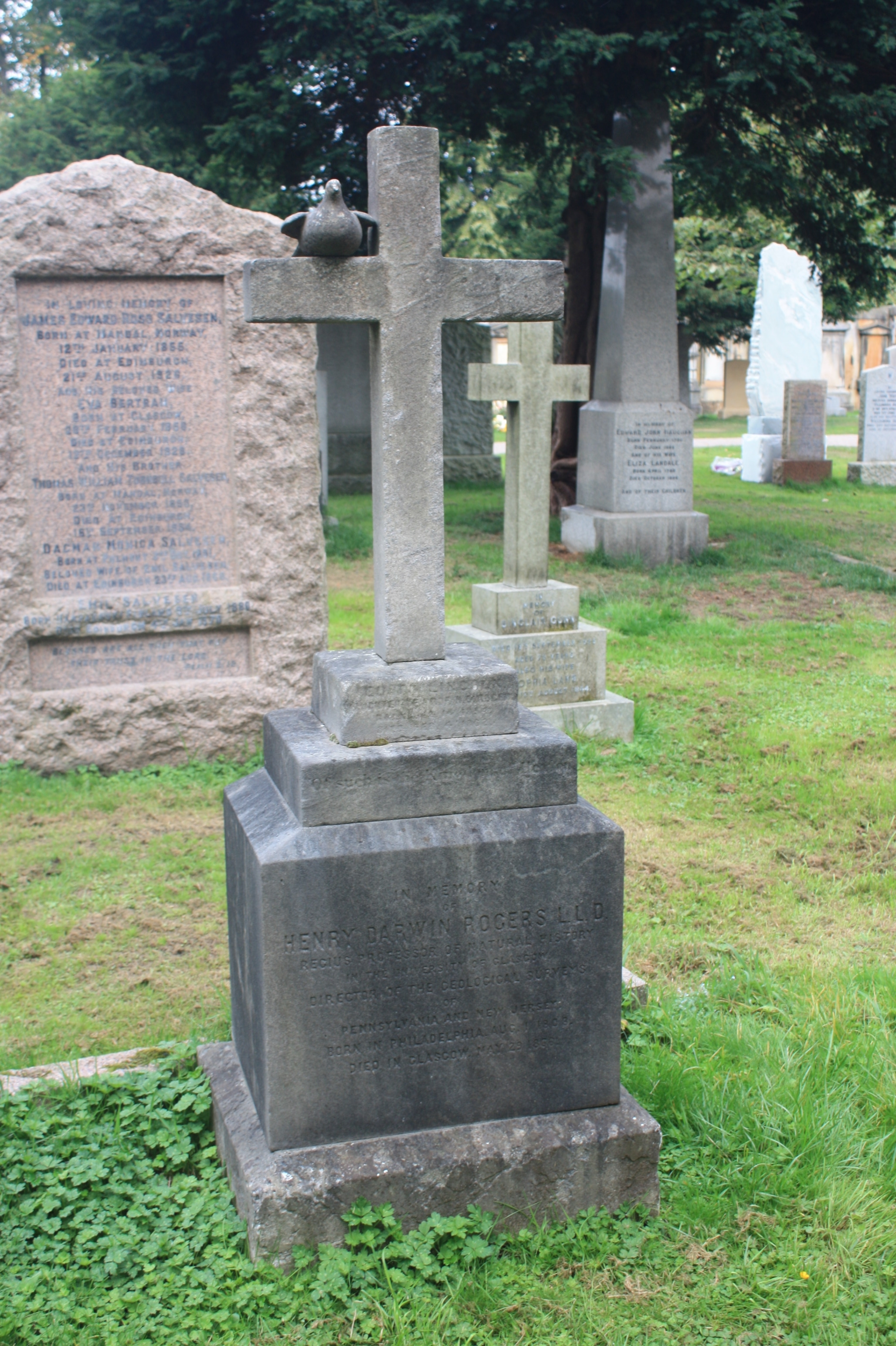
The grave of Henry Darwin Rogers, Dean Cemetery

Henry Darwin Rogers FRS FRSE LLD (1 August 1808 – 26 May 1866) was an American geologist. His book, The Geology of Pennsylvania: A Government Survey (1858), was regarded as one of the most important publications on American geology issued up to that point.

== Biography ==
Rogers was born in Philadelphia, Pennsylvania on 1 August 1808, the third of four sons of Patrick Kerr Rogers and Hannah Blythe Rogers. His parents were from Ireland, near Derry City, and emigrated to the United States where they first met and became married. Patrick Rogers was a supporter of militant efforts to end British rule in Ireland and was forced to flee to avoid persecution. Henry's middle name was given to him in honour of Erasmus Darwin, of whose poem "The Botanic Garden" his father was a great admirer.

In 1813 the family moved to Baltimore, Maryland, where Henry was educated in the public schools, and in 1819 they moved to Williamsburg, Virginia, where his father was professor of natural philosophy and mathematics in the College of William & Mary from 1819 until 1828, and which Henry attended for a short time. His father provided most of his education. After attending William and Mary, Henry worked at a school in Windsor, Maryland which he administered with his brother William Barton Rogers. It closed in 1828, and he joined his brother teaching at the Maryland Institute.

At the age of 21, he was chosen professor of chemistry and natural philosophy at Dickinson College, Pennsylvania. During the year in which he held the professorship, he edited a monthly scientific magazine, The Messenger of Useful Knowledge, in which educational, literary, and political articles and selections from foreign journals were also published. His interest in the ideas of Johann Heinrich Pestalozzi was not welcome at Dickinson and led to his dismissal in 1831. His interest in education reform led him to the British social reformer Robert Owen and his son Robert Dale Owen in New York. On their suggestion, in 1831 or 1832 he went to England, where, with aid afforded him by his brother William, he studied chemistry in the laboratory of Edward Turner, and attended other scientific lectures in London, including those of De la Beche on geology.

He returned to Philadelphia in the summer of 1833, and in the ensuing winter delivered a course of lectures on geology in the hall of the Franklin Institute. Having received the degree of Master of Arts from the University of Pennsylvania in 1834, he was elected professor of geology and mineralogy in that institution in 1835, where he remained until his resignation in 1846. In 1835, Rogers was elected as a member to the American Philosophical Society.

In 1835, he was chosen to make a geological and mineralogical survey of New Jersey, and, in addition to a preliminary report in 1836, he published Description of the Geology of the State of New Jersey (Philadelphia, 1840). On the organisation of the geological survey of the state of Pennsylvania in 1836, he was appointed geologist in charge, and engaged in active field work until 1841, when the appropriations were discontinued.

In 1842, he and his brother William, who was similarly occupied with a geological survey in Virginia (his reports were published in 1838 and 1841, and he wrote also on the connection between thermal springs and anticlinal axes and faults), brought before the Association of American Geologists and Naturalists their conclusions on the physical structure of the Appalachian chain, and on the elevation of great mountain chains. The researches of H. D. Rogers were elaborated in his final report on Pennsylvania, in which he included a general account of the geology of the United States and of the coal fields of North America and Great Britain. In this important work, he dealt also with the structure of the great coal fields, the method of formation of the strata, and the changes in the character of the coal from the bituminous type to anthracite.

During the ten ensuing years, his services were retained as an expert by various coal companies. During this period – in 1846 – he moved to Boston. The field work of the Pennsylvania survey was resumed in 1851 and continued until 1854. Six annual reports were published between 1836 and 1842, and in 1855 the preparation of a final report was confided to him. Finding that the work could be done less expensively abroad, he transferred his residence to Edinburgh and issued The Geology of Pennsylvania, a Government Survey. The book, in two quarto volumes, contains 1682 pages, is illustrated by 778 woodcuts and diagrams in the text, 69 plates, and 18 folded sheets of sections, and was published by W. Blackwood & Sons (London and Edinburgh), and J. B. Lippincott & Co., Philadelphia, in 1858.

In 1854, he married Elizabeth Stillman Lincoln. They had two children.

In 1857, he was appointed Regius Professor of Natural History and Geology at the University of Glasgow. The same year he was also appointed as keeper of the Hunterian Museum and Clerk to the Trustees. One of his later essays (1861) was on the parallel 'roads' (geological terraces) of Lochaber (Glen Roy), the origin of which he attributed to a vast inundation.

He died at 5 Elgin Villas in Shawlands, Glasgow in 1866 seemingly as a result of a combination of overwork, a weak constitution and the effect of the Glasgow climate. He was buried amongst Edinburgh's rich and famous in the south-east section of Dean Cemetery near the south path.

The University of Glasgow appointed geologist John Young to replace Rogers.

== Works ==
Rogers published more than 30 papers and reports, including the annual and final reports for his state surveys and reports on coal deposits for mining companies.

- The Geology of Pennsylvania: A Government Survey (two volumes, 1858)
