= Peter Macnair (geologist) =

Scottish naturalist and geologist

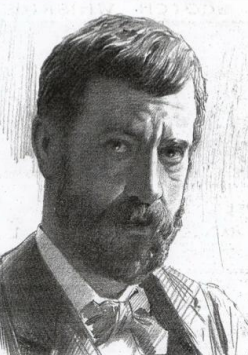
Sketch of Peter Macnair circa 1900

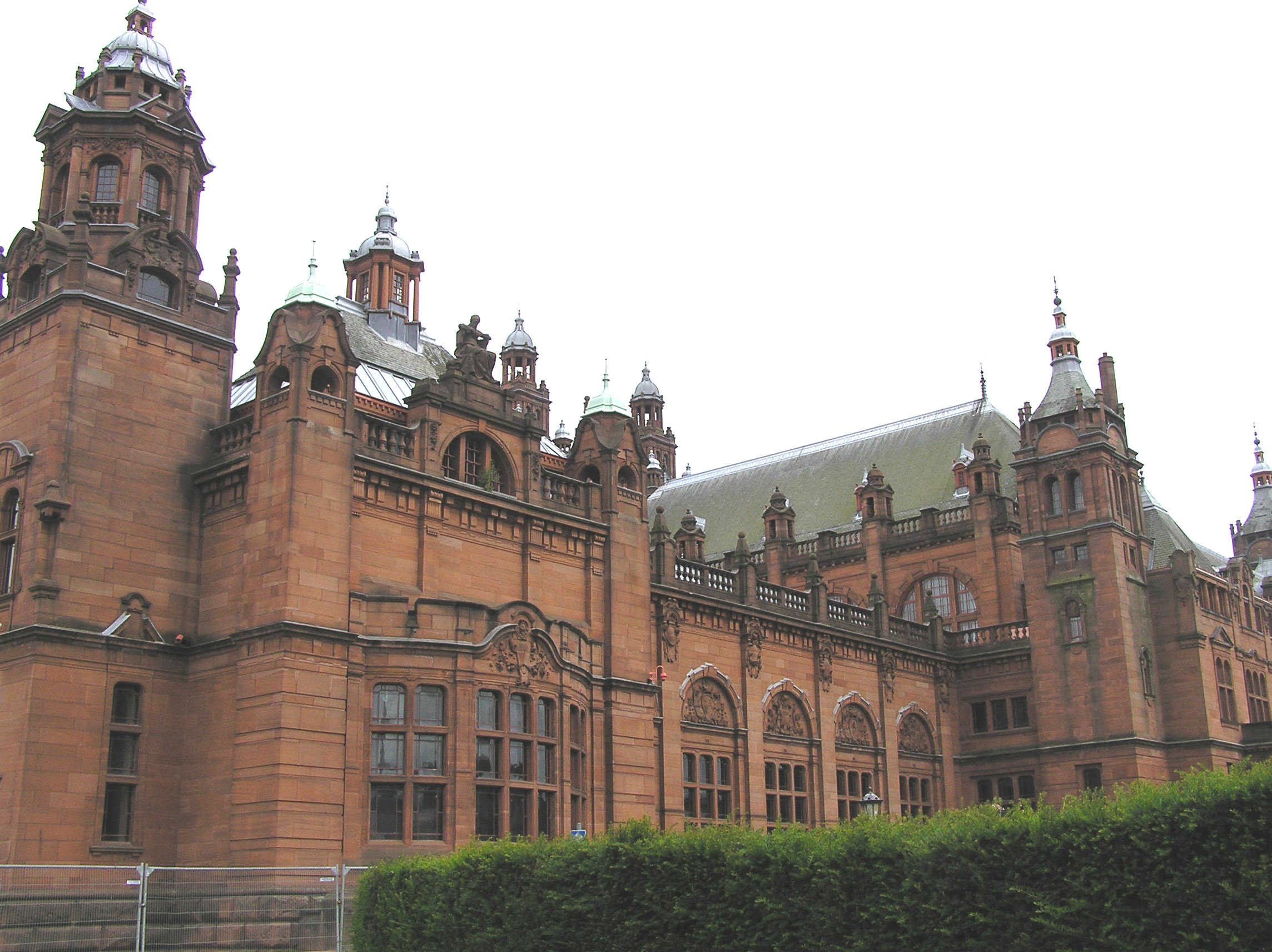
Kelvingrove Museum in Glasgow

Prof Peter Macnair FRSE FGS (1868–1929) was a Scottish naturalist and geologist. He was Curator of the Kelvingrove Art Gallery and Museum. He was President of the Geological Society of Glasgow.

== Life ==
He was born in Glasgow on 12 September 1868 into a family with a draper’s business, J & M Macnair, but his family moved to Perthshire in his childhood and he was educated at Kinnoull Primary School, then Perth Academy. He was then apprenticed as a draper in the family firm in 1882. He spent much free time studying geology at the Perth Museum.

In 1886 he went to work in Killin. In 1889 he returned to Perth. His mother by this time is shown as a widow, Mrs James Macnair, seamstress, living at 14 Watergate in Perth. Peter is presumed to have lived with her as he is not listed independently in directories. In 1890 he moved to Glasgow living at 1 Morris Place with other family members, to help to run J & M Macnair. He then joined the Glasgow Geological Society.

In 1889 his geological interests led to him being created Curator of the People's Palace on Glasgow Green. He was then asked to assist in the scientific exhibits in the Glasgow International Exhibition (1901). In 1902 he was created Curator of the Museum section of Kelvingrove Art Gallery and Museum. Concurrently he was made Professor of Zoology at Anderson College Medical School. At this stage he lived at 20 Martyr Street in Glasgow.

In 1907 he was elected a Fellow of the Royal Society of Edinburgh. His proposers were John Walter Gregory, John Horne, Malcolm Laurie and Ben Peach.

In later life he lived at 39 Gardner Street in Partick. He died in Glasgow on 29 March 1929.

== Family ==
In 1894 he married Rebecca MacKenzie. They had seven children - Peter, Duncan, Helena, Ian, Catherine, Joan and Hector. Peter, Duncan and Ian all served in the First World War. Ian died in 1918 serving in the Royal Flying Corps. Peter became Professor of Metallurgy at Swansea University. Duncan settled in Canada and in 1937 married Dorothy Livesay. Helena Macnair gained an MA in Geology and Palaeontology at Glasgow University in 1920.

== Publications ==
- The Geology and Scenery of the Grampians and the Valley of the Strathmore (1908) 2 vols. (See Grampian Mountains and Strathmore, Angus.)
- A Guide to the Mineral Collection of the Kelvingrove Museum (1910)
- Cambridge County Geography: Perthshire (1912)
- Cambridge County Geography: Argyll and Bute (1914)
- Cambridge University Press: 'Perthshire' Pocket Edition (1914)
