= Elizabeth Gray (fossil collector) =

Scottish fossil collector

- Born: Elizabeth Anderson; 21 February 1831; Alloway, Scotland
- Died: 11 February 1924 (aged 92); Edinburgh, Scotland
- Known for: Fossil collecting
- Spouse: Robert Gray
- Children: Alice, Edith and others

Elizabeth Gray (born Elizabeth Anderson; 21 February 1831 – 11 February 1924) was a Scottish early fossil collector. Gray created scientifically organised collections of fossils for several museums.

== Life ==
Elizabeth Anderson was born in Alloway in 1831. She and her family moved to Enoch near Girvan in Ayrshire where they farmed and Elizabeth attended a small private school. Her father was described as an enthusiastic collector of fossils who had a type of trilobite named after him. Anderson was sent to a boarding school in Glasgow when she was fifteen. She stayed for a year and then returned to help in the home.

== Marriage (and holidays in Girvan) ==
She married Robert Gray on 8 April 1856 and they both shared an interest in collecting fossils each holiday back in Girvan. She was assisted by their children when they were able. They lived in Glasgow, where Robert worked in a bank, and their holidays were spent back in Ayrshire. Elizabeth's interest lay in documenting and discovering fossils and she trained her children to document their findings too. Robert co-founded the Natural History Society of Glasgow where much of their findings were exhibited. It was traditional that men took the lead and Mrs Robert Gray was a name she used. Robert would present and take credit for his family's work. At the time you needed to publish papers to join learned societies. Elizabeth's specimens were frequently used at the start of meetings of the Natural History Society of Glasgow but with poor attribution that implied that her husband or she were possibly those responsible. However, in 1866 the first Gray collection was given to the Hunterian Museum in Glasgow by the two of them.

The curator of the Hunterian Museum was John Young who was the Regius Professor of Natural History at the University of Glasgow and a strong supporter for women's higher education. He ran classes for women and in 1869 he invited Elizabeth to attend lectures in geology at his university. Her finds and their scientific descriptions became type specimens. Many of her finds are type specimens; the mollusc Lophospira trispiralis, the starfish Hudsonaster grayae and the echinoderm Archophiactis grayae are all defined by fossils she found.

From 1874 they were able to use the expertise of the palaeontologists of Edinburgh as the family moved to follow Robert's new job. The Ordovician fossils were described and classified. Robert died in 1887.

== Further collaboration ==
Elizabeth Gray's work was drawn upon by many publications, such as Charles Lapworth's Girvan Succession of 1882. Lapworth noted her work's significance as "the very first collection in which the exact localities and horizons of every individual fossil...[were] written down at the time of collection." Elizabeth was offered the chance to learn how to scientifically describe her own finds by Doctor Ramsay Traquair of the Royal Scottish Museum, but she wanted to concentrate on curating specimens for others to study as she felt that those she sent fossils to had more specific taxonomic expertise and she wanted the best minds to work on her collections. The palaeontologist Thomas Davidson, a specialist in brachiopods, was probably the first to utilise the Gray collection and described several new species in his monograph on the British Fossil Brachiopoda (1866–71). In 1878–1880, R. Etheridge and H. Alleyne Nicholson published a Monograph of the Silurian Fossils of the Girvan District in Ayrshire using Gray's collection. When Nicholson's funding ran out so did his interest and Gray turned to F.R.Cowper Reed of Cambridge for assistance. He was thought of as a recluse but he was able to publish several papers based on Gray's fossils and it is thought that he never visited the site to see where they had been collected. William Kingdon Spencer worked on her fossils as did Jane Longstaff who sorted out the fossil gastropods. Gray was constantly organising and begging for assistance to ensure that her finds were described correctly and to this end she had a long and at times impatient correspondence with Francis Bather at the British Museum.

In 1900 Gray was made an honorary member of the Geological Society of Glasgow, and in 1903, aged 72, Gray was awarded the Murchison Fund of the Geological Society of London in recognition of her lifelong contributions to the field. The ODNB notes that Gray was "a woman of considerable character, determination, and resourcefulness, with a phenomenally retentive memory."

Gray continued gathering fossils until the age of 92, and died in Edinburgh in 1924. After her death, her work was continued by her daughters, Alice and Edith.

== Legacy ==
Gray has left extensive collections of Scottish fossils in a number of British museums. She and her family worked in Girvan from 1855 to 1941. The family created scientifically organised collections of fossils for several museums including the Natural History Museum. Alice, assisted by Edith, continued to visit Girvan until 1941. Alice described it as the recreation of her childhood. They would cover where they had been working to avoid others discovering their current interest and they would not retire for the night until the days findings had been catalogued. Even the chippings from their specimens were retained so that they could be further split, in their house, to find further fossils. Excluding her father's work the family's interest in actively collecting fossils lasted for 86 years.
