= David Page (geologist) =

Scottish geologist and scientific author

David Page FRSE FGS LLD (1814–1879) was a 19th-century Scottish geologist and scientific author. He was President of the Edinburgh Geological Society.

Page was born on 24 August 1814 in Lochgelly, Fifeshire, where his father was a mason and builder. After being educated locally he was sent, at age 14, to the University of St Andrews, to be study divinity. However, he never joined the ministry and instead worked in scientific lecturing and journalism, acting for a time as editor of a Fifeshire newspaper.

In 1843 Page became the Scientific Editor to W. & R. Chambers, publishers in Edinburgh. He is supposed to have assisted Robert Chambers in writing the Vestiges of the Natural History of Creation. He was recruited to Chambers in 1843, while Vestiges, published 1844, was being written. His role is said, in fact, to have been to correct mistakes in science, in the first few editions. Later Page was in dispute with Chambers over his conditions of employment, wishing to be made a partner. He left the firm on bad terms with management, and revealed the authorship of Robert Chambers in 1854, after one of his lectures: up to this point it had been a well-guarded secret.

In Edinburgh he lived at 38 Gilmore Place in the south-west of the city.

Page was elected Fellow of the Geological Society in 1853, was president of the Geological Society of Edinburgh in 1863 and 1865. In 1863 he was elected a fellow of the Royal Society of Edinburgh his proposer being Lyon Playfair. In 1867 the University of St. Andrews honoured him with an honorary doctorate (LLD).

In July 1871 he was appointed Professor of Geology in the Durham University College of Physical Science, based at Newcastle upon Tyne.

His health was failing, and he died at Newcastle-upon-Tyne on 9 March 1879, leaving a widow, two sons, and one daughter.

== Works ==
Page contributed some fourteen papers to scientific periodicals, among them those of the Geological and the Physical Society of Edinburgh and the British Association. Known as a lecturer, he also authored numerous textbooks on geological subjects. They were at least 12 in number, and included:

- Handbook of Geological Terms (1859);
- The Past and Present Life of the Globe (1861, Edinburgh).
- The Earth's Crust (1864, Edinburgh; 6th edit. 1872);
- Geology for General Readers (1866; 12th edit. 1888); and
- Man: Where, Whence and Wither? Being a Glance at Man in his Natural History Relations (1868, New York);
- textbooks (elementary and advanced) Geology and Physical Geography which went through numerous editions;

== Notes ==
Attribution This article incorporates text from a publication now in the public domain: Lee, Sidney, ed. (1895). "Page, David". Dictionary of National Biography. Vol. 43. London: Smith, Elder & Co.
