= Edwin Mervyn Patterson =

Irish-born research chemist and geologist

- Born: 14 March 1920; Northern Ireland
- Died: 11 April 1997 (aged 77)

Academic background
- Education: Queen's University Belfast (BSc)

Academic work
- Discipline: Chemistry; Geology
- Institutions: University of St Andrews; Nobel Enterprises; Geological Society of Glasgow

Edward Mervyn Patterson FRSE FRGS FGS FSAScot (14 March 1920 – 11 April 1997) was an Irish-born research chemist and geologist. He was president of the Geological Society of Glasgow from 1964 to 1967.

== Early life and education ==
He was born in Northern Ireland on 14 March 1920, the son of John Wilson Patterson, a civil servant, and his wife, Dorothy Mary Ekin. He was educated at Bangor Grammar School. He then studied chemistry at Queen's University Belfast, earning a BSc in 1941.

== Career ==
After earning his bachelor's degree, Patterson began work as a research chemist, specialising in explosives. In 1947, he began lecturing in geology at the University of St Andrews. In 1954, he became the plant manager at Nobel's Explosive Company at Ardeer, North Ayrshire in west Scotland, remaining there until retiring in 1982.

In 1957 he was elected a fellow of the Royal Society of Edinburgh. His proposers were Frederick Walker, Samuel James Shand, Sergei Tomkeieff, Archibald Gordon MacGregor and James Ernest Richey.

== Personal life ==
Patterson was married to Violet Adams. He died on 11 April 1997.
