= Regius Professor of Zoology =

Professorship at the University of Glasgow

The Regius Chair of Zoology is a Regius Professorship at the University of Glasgow. It was founded in 1807 by George III of the United Kingdom as the Regius Chair of Natural History. In 1903, when the Chair of Geology was founded at Glasgow University, the title was changed to Zoology.

== Regius Professors of Natural History/Regius Professors of Zoology ==
- Lockhart Muirhead MA LLD (1807)
- William Couper MA MD (1829)
- Henry Darwin Rogers MA LLD (1857)
- John Young MD (1866)
- Sir John Graham Kerr MA LLD FRS (August 1902)
- Edward Hindle MA PhD ScD FRS (1935)
- Charles Maurice Yonge CBE PhD DSc FRS (1944)
- David Richmond Newth BSc PhD (1965)
- Keith Vickerman PhD DSc FRSE FRS (1984–1998)
- 1998 - 2013 vacant
- Pat Monaghan PhD FRES FRS (2013 - now)

== See also ==
- List of Professorships at the University of Glasgow
