= John Young (professor of natural history) =

British professor of natural history

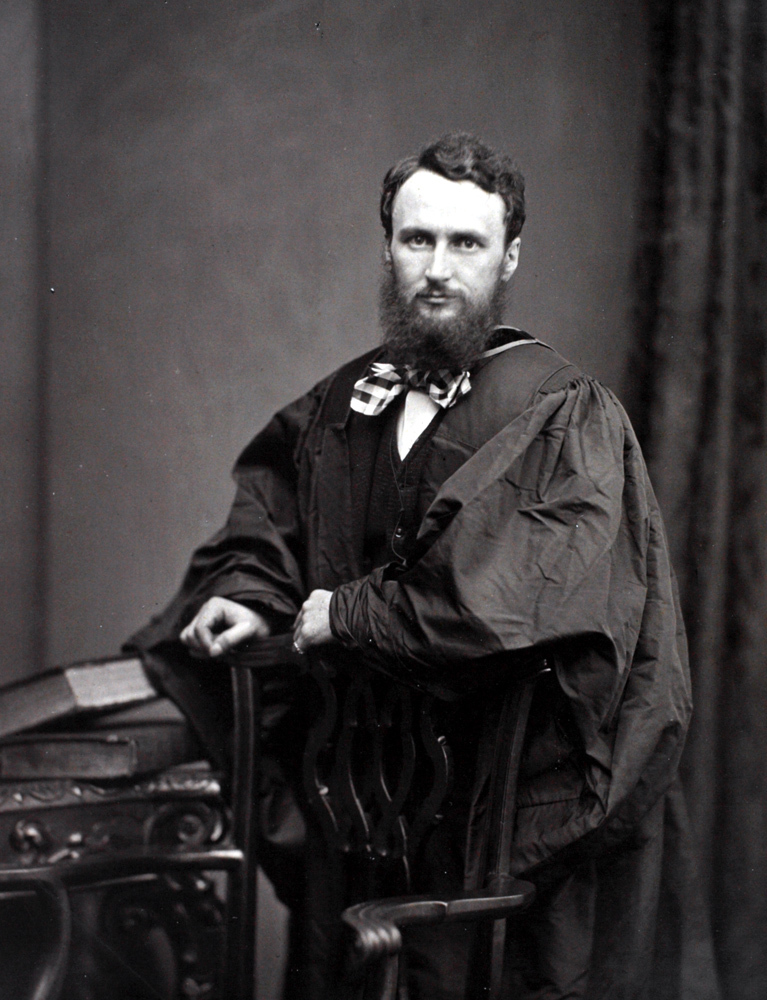
- Born: 1835
- Died: 1902 (aged 66–67)
- Predecessor: Henry Darwin Rogers
- Successor: reorganised

John Young FRSE (1835–1902) was a British Regius Professor of Natural History at Glasgow University and Keeper of the Hunterian Museum from 1866 to 1902.

== Life ==
He was born in Edinburgh on 17 November 1835. He was educated at the High School on Calton Hill. He then studied medicine at Edinburgh University, gaining his doctorate (MD) in 1857.

Young worked as a medical doctor after qualifying at the University of Edinburgh in 1857. He then worked in the Edinburgh Royal Infirmary and Edinburgh Royal Asylum.

From 1860 to 1866 he worked on the H M Geological Survey working on the Ordnance Survey. Here he met and befriended Roderick Murchison. In 1863 he was elected a Fellow of the Royal Society of Edinburgh his proposer being Alexander Keith Johnston.

His background was a fortuitous as the retiring Regius Chair of Natural History in Glasgow was becoming vacant and the last person, Henry Darwin Rogers, who had died, was a geologist. Young had a medical and geological background which he used to teach students Zoology and Geology. Young was interested in coins and was widely read. He published work on palaeontology.

From 1866 he served Glasgow University as its professor of natural history, unusually teaching both zoology and geology.

He was concurrently the head keeper of the Hunterian Museum, which contained the eclectic gatherings of its founder. Young realised that the museum was intended to support teaching. On the one hand he proposed that the collections of coins should be sold, on the other hand he brought in fresh fossils from Girvan which had been gathered by the enthusiastic fossil collector Elizabeth Gray.

Young organised for the museum to move to Gilmorehill in 1870.

He died on 13 December 1902. After he died his library was purchased by a benefactor as a gift to the university.

Young is sometimes confused with Mr. (later Dr.) John Young F.G.S. (1823–1900), also of Glasgow and a geologist and Hunterian Museum curator, with whom he co-authored papers and named several taxa. Among their contemporaries, Mr Young was referred to as "The Good", and Professor Young as "The Bad". Professor Young supported his namesake and attempted to have the latter's museum salary raised.

== Publications ==
- A History of the Glasgow Geological Society 1858-1908
- Catalogue of Pictures, Sculptures and Other Works of Art in the University of Glasgow, 1880
