= William Roberts Flett =

Scottish geologist and author

William Roberts Flett FRSE FGS (1900–1979) was a Scottish geologist and author. He served in both world wars.

== Life ==
He was born in Kirkwall on Orkney, the son of James Scott Flett and his wife Margaret Beatton Robertson.

On leaving school in 1916 he joined the Gordon Highlanders but was not sent into action (being only 16) and was involved in military education programmes. At the end of the war he went to Glasgow University to study Geology and graduated BSc in 1924, immediately moving onto the staff at the university as a lecturer in geology. In 1947 he moved to the Royal Technical College as a Senior Lecturer.

In the Second World War he again served in the Gordon Highlanders rising to the rank of Lieutenant.

In 1952 he was elected a Fellow of the Royal Society of Edinburgh. His proposers were John G. C. Anderson, Neville George, Basil Charles King, John Weir and George W. Tyrell.

He died on 22 August 1979 aged 79.

== Family ==
He was married and had a son and a daughter.
