= George Walter Tyrrell =

British geologist, glaciologist and petrologist

George Walter Tyrrell FRSE FGS (1883–1961) was a 20th-century British geologist, glaciologist and petrologist. A specialist in Arctic and Antarctic landscapes he was the first to describe the recticular glaciers of Spitzbergen.

Mount Tyrrell on Alexander Island in Antarctica and the Tyrrell Glacier on South Georgia are named after him.

== Life ==
He was born in Watford on 30 May 1883 the eldest son of Annie and George Tyrrell.

He was educated at Watford Grammar School, then studied geology at the Royal College of Science under Prof J. W. Judd.

In 1906 he began teaching geology at the University of Glasgow under John Walter Gregory. In 1919 he was geological advisor of a Scottish trip to Spitzbergen and in 1924 led a geological trip in Iceland. The university awarded him two doctorates: a PhD in 1923 and DSc in 1931.

He was elected a Fellow of the Royal Society of Edinburgh in 1918. His proposers were John Horne, Ben Peach, Thomas James Jehu and Robert Kidston. He won the Society's Neill Prize for 1931–33. He was Vice President of the Society from 1940 to 1943.

In 1931 he won the Murchison Medal awarded by the Royal Geographical Society.

Rising to Senior Lecturer he retired from the University of Glasgow in 1948, then spent some years lecturing in Canada and the United States.

He died in Bearsden in the Glasgow suburbs on 20 July 1961.

== Family ==
In 1906 he married Alice Annie Williman.

In 1950, aged 67, he married Ursula Joan Dermont.

== Publications ==
- The Whangie and its Origin (1916)
- The Geology of Spitzbergen (1923)
- The Geology of Arran (1931)
- Vulkany (1934 - Russian)
- Osnovy Petrologii (1933)
- Principles of Petrology (1950)
