= Charles Hepworth Holland =

British geologist (1923–2019)

Charles Hepworth Holland (30 June 1923 – 26 December 2019) was a British geologist, Emeritus Fellow and former Professor of Geology and Mineralogy at Trinity College Dublin.

== Career ==
Holland was born in Southport and attended Southport Technical College. His initial study of physics and mathematics at University of Liverpool was interrupted by World War II. Influenced by a cousin, he subsequently studied geology at the University of Manchester. Remaining to do postgraduate research, he began work on the Ordovician of the Bala area and then the Silurian of Ludlow.

At Manchester he formed the Ludlow Research Group (LRG) with Jim Lawson and Vic Walmsley. This led to the publication of A revised classification of the Ludlovian succession at Ludlow in 1959.

After a period as assistant lecturer at Manchester Holland moved to Bedford College as lecturer and subsequently senior lecturer. In 1966 he was appointed professor of Geology and Mineralogy at Trinity College Dublin, a post which he held until retirement in 1993.

He was president of the Geological Society, 1984–86. In 2008 the Palaeontological Association awarded him the Lapworth Medal. He has written over 150 scientific articles and three books.

== Selected bibliography ==
- The Idea of Time, 1999, WileyBlackwell, ISBN 0-471-98545-7
- The Irish Landscape: A Scenery to Celebrate, Edinburgh: Dunedin Academic Press, 2003, ISBN 1-903765-20-X
- The Geology of Ireland, Charles H. Holland and Ian S. Sanders (eds), (1st Ed. 1981), 2nd Ed. 2009, Edinburgh: Dunedin Academic Press, ISBN 978-1-903765-71-5
