= Robert Gray (ornithologist) =

Scottish banker and famed amateur ornithologist

Robert Gray FRSE (15 August 1825 – 18 February 1887), was a Scottish banker and famed amateur ornithologist.

== Life ==
Gray was born at Dunbar on 15 August 1825, the son of Archibald Gray, a Dunbar merchant. He was educated at the parish school in Dunbar.

At the age of fifteen he became an apprentice in the branch of the British Linen Company Bank. Five years afterwards he joined the head office of the City of Glasgow Bank. Here he attained the position of inspector of branches, an appointment which had an important influence upon his scientific pursuits. From early years he had been addicted to the study of natural history. He soon adopted ornithology as his speciality. He became the inspector of the bank's branches and during his frequent inspections he studied the local birds. The note-books and their illustrations by his skilful pencil, formed the basis of his Birds of the West of Scotland, published in 1871.

In 1851 Gray was one of the founders of the Natural History Society of Glasgow. He contributed to the Proceedings of that body, was its treasurer from 1854 to 1856, and was elected its secretary in 1858, a post which he resigned in 1871, when he was appointed agent of the branch of the City of Glasgow Bank in St. Vincent Street, Glasgow. On 8 April 1856 he had married Elizabeth Anderson, daughter of Thomas Anderson of Girvan. She formed extensive geological collections illustrative of the fossils of the silurian rocks of the south of Scotland during the family's annual holidays at Girwen.

== Edinburgh ==
In March 1874 Gray entered the service of the Bank of Scotland as superintendent of branches, Edinburgh, and eight years later he became cashier there, an appointment which he retained during the rest of his life.

In 1875, he was elected a Fellow of the Royal Society of Edinburgh due to his contributions to ornithology. His proposers were William Ferguson, Alexander Dickson, William Wallace and William Keddie. He served as the society's vice president 1882 to 1886.

In Edinburgh he again devoted himself to the interests of science. Over and above his connection to the Royal Society of Edinburgh it was in connection with the Royal Physical Society that he made his main influence. This society, one of the oldest scientific bodies in Edinburgh, had ‘fallen into one of its periodic fits of depression,’ when, in 1877, Gray accepted its secretaryship. He entered on his duties with great energy, and, by his courtesy and singular charm of manner not less than by his power of organisation and his excellent business faculty, he was successful in introducing needed reforms, in attracting new members and inspiriting old ones, and, finally, in placing the society upon a satisfactory footing as an active scientific body, issuing printed ‘Proceedings.’ At the time of his death, which occurred suddenly in Edinburgh on 18 February 1887, Gray was engaged, in conjunction with William Evans, upon a volume dealing with the birds of the east coast of Scotland.

== Family ==
In 1856 he married Elizabeth Anderson who became a famous fossil-collector. Their daughters, Mary, Alice, agnes and Edith were also known for creating fossil collections, most of which are now held by the Natural History Museum in London. The sisters are commemorated by a bird bath in the Royal Botanic Gardens Edinburgh. It was designed by Sir Frank Mears and carved by Pilkington Jackson.
