= Robert Kidston =

Scottish botanist and palaeobotanist

- Born: 29 June 1852; Bishopton, Renfrewshire
- Died: 13 July 1924 (aged 72); Gilfach Goch, Wales
- Awards: Murchison Medal
- Scientific career
- Fields: palaeobotany
- Workplaces: University of Edinburgh
- Author abbrev. (botany): Kidst.

Robert Kidston (29 June 1852 – 13 July 1924) was a Scottish botanist and palaeobotanist.

== Life ==
He was born in Bishopton House in Renfrewshire on 29 June 1852 the youngest of twelve children of Robert Alexander Kidston, a Glasgow businessman, and his wife, Mary Anne Meigh. He was educated at the High School in Stirling.

He studied botany at the University of Edinburgh and later studied the Rhynie chert and worked for the British Geological Survey. Kidston was "arguably the best and most influential palaeobotanist of his day. In over 180 scientific papers he laid the foundations for a modern understanding of the taxonomy and palaeobiology of Devonian and Carboniferous plants." The Prime Minister Bonar Law was his first cousin.

In the 1880s Kidston was asked to catalogue the Palaeozoic plant collection of the British Museum (Natural History). This work began in February 1883, and was completed in 1886.

In 1886, he was elected a Fellow of the Royal Society of Edinburgh. His proposers were Alexander Dikson, John Duns, Sir John Murray, and Robert Gray. He served as the Society's Secretary 1909 to 1916 and as Vice President 1917 to 1920. He uniquely won the Society's Neill Prize twice: 1886-1889 and 1915–17.

He received an honorary doctorate (LLD) from Glasgow University in 1908 and a second doctorate (DSc) from Manchester University in 1921.

He died whilst visiting his friend David Davies in Gilfach Goch in Wales on 13 July 1924. He is buried with his family in Logie Churchyard near Stirling.

== Family ==
For most of his life he lived with his three unmarried sister in a house on Victoria Place in Stirling.

In 1898 he married Agnes Marion Christian Oliphant (d.1950), twenty years his junior. They had two daughters, Hannah and Marjory. They lived in a large house at 12 Clarendon Place in Stirling with several servants.

== Awards ==
He was elected a Fellow of the Royal Society (FRS) in June 1902, and won the Murchison Medal of the Geological Society of London in 1916.

He was awarded two gold medals for photography. The medals and a 4000 strong collection of glass negatives were presented to the Geological Survey by his grandson, Geoffrey Wilkinson, in 2007.

== Publications ==
- Flora of the Carboniferous Period
- Catalogue of the Palaeozoic Plants in the British Museum
