= James Ernest Richey =

Irish-born geologist

James Ernest Richey MC FRS FRSE FGS
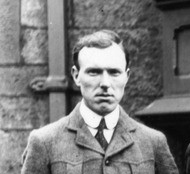
- James Ernest Richey
- Born: 24 April 1886; County Tyrone, Ireland
- Died: 19 June 1968 (aged 82); Coleshill, Warwickshire
- Citizenship: Irish
- Spouse: Henrietta Lily McNally
- Awards: Fellow (Royal Society of Edinburgh), Lyell Medal (Geological Society of London), Clough Medal (Edinburgh Geological Society), Neill Prize and Medal of the Royal Society of Edinburgh
- Website: The Royal Society Memoir

James Ernest Richey MC FRS FRSE FGS (24 April 1886 – 19 June 1968) was an Irish-born geologist.

== Life ==
He was born on 24 April 1886 in Desertcreat in County Tyrone in Ireland, the son of Rev John Richey, rector of the local church. His later education was at St Columba's College near Dublin and he then won a place at Trinity College, Dublin studying Natural Sciences under such as John Joly in 1904. He graduated BSc in 1908. Despite a clear push towards Geology he continued for a further year at Trinity College, this time studying engineering, gaining a BAI in 1909.

His first employment was at Oxford University working as a Demonstrator during the lectures of William Johnson Sollas for the academic year 1910/11.

He then left academia to work in the field. He joined the Scottish Geological Survey under John Horne his initial posting being to the Isle of Mull and rapidly became the foremost authority on the geology of that island.

As with most, his career was interrupted by the First World War. He was commissioned in the Royal Engineers (Guards Division) serving in the 76th Field Company on the western front. He served in multiple battles and was wounded at least once. He won the Military Cross and was discharged in 1919 at the rank of captain.

He returned to the Geological Survey of Scotland in 1922 as a Senior Geologist and became District Geologist in 1925.

In 1927 he was elected a Fellow of the Royal Society of Edinburgh. His proposers were his boss, John Horne, Sir John Smith Flett, Murray Macgregor, and Sir Edward Battersby Bailey. He served as the society's general secretary from 1946 to 1956 and as vice president from 1956 to 1959. He won the society's Neill Prize for the period 1963–65. In 1932 he served as president of the Glasgow Geological Society. In 1933 the Geological Society of London awarded him their Lyell Medal. In 1934 he was given an honorary doctorate (DSc). In 1938 he was elected a Fellow of the Royal Society of London.

He retired in 1946.

He died in Coleshill, Warwickshire on 19 June 1968.

== Publications ==
- The Economic Geology of the Ayrshire Coalfields (1925)
- The Structural Relations of the Mourne Granites, Northern Ireland (1927)
- The Geology of Ardnamurchan (1930)
- British Regional Geology: Scotland the Tertiary Volcanic Districts (1948)
- Elements of Engineering Geology (1964)

== Family ==
In 1924 he married Henrietta Lily McNally.
