= Neville George =

British geologist

Professor Neville George FRS FRSE FGS

Professor of Geology, University of Glasgow
- In office 1947–1974

Personal details
- Born: Thomas Neville George; 13 May 1904 Morriston, Swansea, Wales
- Died: 18 June 1980 (aged 76)

Thomas Neville George (13 May 1904 – 18 June 1980) was a Welsh geologist. He was president of the Geological Society of London.

== Life ==
Thomas Neville George was born in the Morriston district of Swansea, the son of Thomas Rupert George, a schoolmaster and ardent socialist, and his wife, Elizabeth Evans, also a teacher. He was educated at Swansea Municipal Secondary School and Swansea Grammar School. He won a place at the University of Wales graduating BSc in 1924 and MSc in 1926. He then went to Cambridge University to study at postgraduate level gaining a doctorate (PhD) in 1928.

From 1930 to 1933 he worked as a geologist for HM Geological Survey. In 1933 he gained a professorship at University College, Swansea, teaching both Geology and Geography. In 1947 Glasgow University gave him a professorship. He stayed in this post until retiral in 1974, serving as Dean of the Faculty of Science 1951 to 1955.

In 1948 he was elected a Fellow of the Royal Society of Edinburgh. His proposers were Sir A. E. Trueman, John Weir, Murray MacGregor, Sir Charles Maurice Yonge and Arthur Holmes. He served as Vice President of the Society 1959 to 1961 and won their Neill Prize for the period 1975-77. In 1963 he was elected a Fellow of the Royal Society of London and in the same year was awarded the Lyell Medal by the Geological Society of London.

The University of Rennes gave him an honorary doctorate (DSc) in 1956. The University of Wales gave him an honorary doctorate (LLD) in 1970.

George was president of the Geological Society of London from 1968 to 1970.

He died in Glasgow on 18 June 1980.

== Publications ==
- South Wales (1970)

== Family ==
In 1932 he married Sarah Hannah Davies. They had no children.
