= Edinburgh Geological Society =

The Edinburgh Geological Society (EGS) was founded in 1834 in Edinburgh, Scotland, with the aim of stimulating public interest in geology and the advancement of geological knowledge. It was a time of debate and controversy surrounding the emerging science of geology and Edinburgh was one of the centres of this debate, which is why the Society is among the oldest of the Scottish scientific societies.

Throughout its 170-year history, the Society has seen major changes in geological thinking, from Darwin's theories of evolution to the modern ideas on plate tectonics. The Society still seeks to stimulate public interest and offers a range of facilities to members including lectures, excursions, publications and the maintenance of a geological library.

== History ==
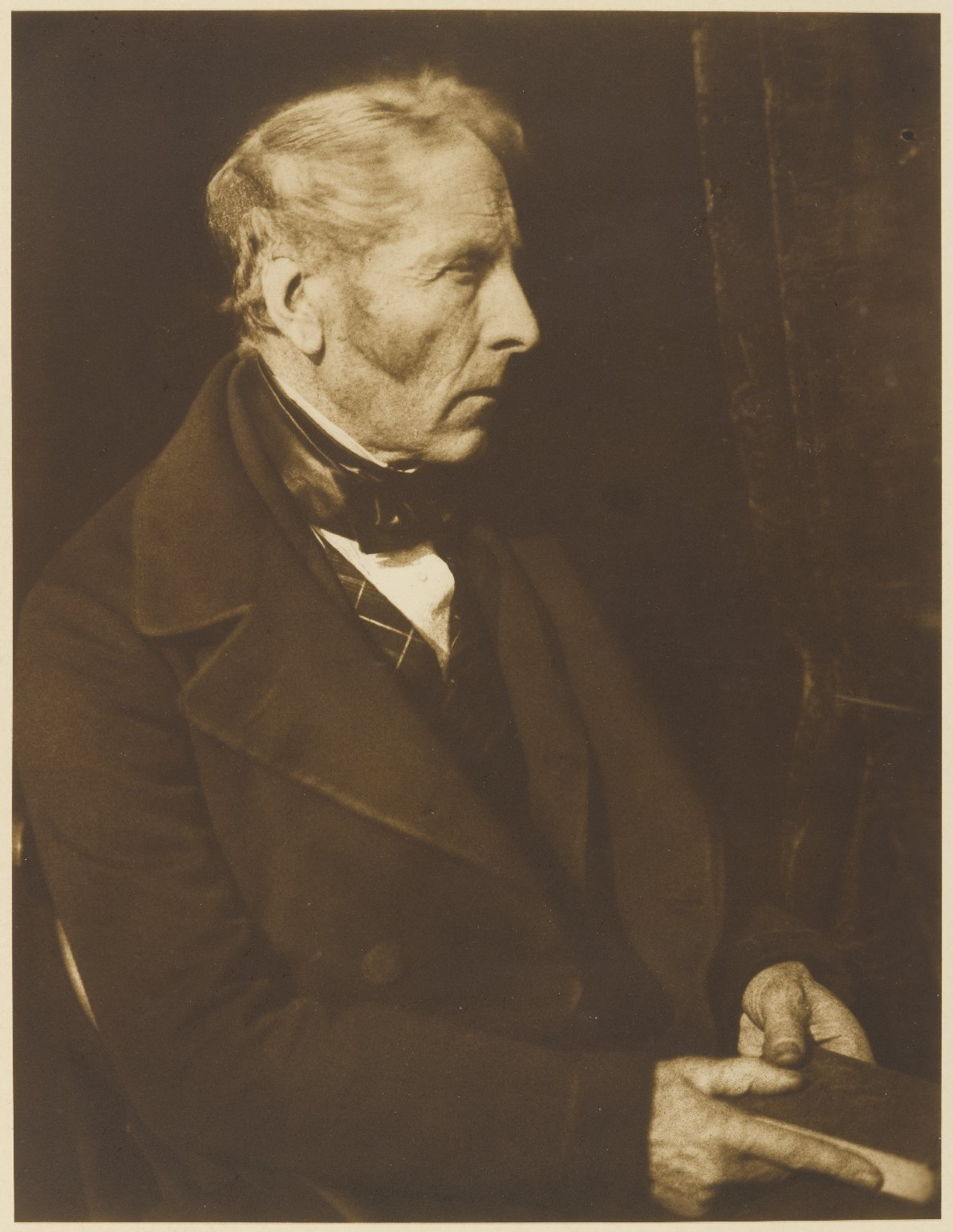
David Milne-Holme

The Society was founded in 1834 by eleven students from the department of Geology and Mineralogy of Queen's College, Edinburgh. They met in Robertson's Tavern, Milne's Close, Edinburgh and resolved to start a geological society 'for discussion and mutual instruction'. At their first scientific meeting, they argued about the volcanic origin of Arthur's Seat in the heart of Edinburgh. They were all students of Alexander Rose and from then on they met in his house in Drummond Street. They elected John Castle as their first President but a few months later, Rose was elected President and remained in that post for 11 years.

=== Notable Presidents of the Society ===
- 1834–35: John Castle — student: first President
- 1835–46: Alexander Rose — lecturer at Queen's College, Edinburgh: 'father of the Society'
- 1863–65: David Page (geologist)
- 1874–89: David Milne-Home — Advocate, geologist and meteorologist: longest tenure as President
- 1908–10: Charles Clough — Geological Survey field geologist
- 1917-18: Thomas John Jehu — Regius Professor of Geology at the University of Edinburgh

== Activities ==
=== Lectures ===
From October to March, a varied programme of illustrated lectures is presented. Each year, a celebrity lecture is given by a geologist of international repute, who is invited jointly by the Society and the Geological Society of Glasgow. There is an annual Members' Night, where members can give accounts of their own geological interests, specimens or travels.

=== Excursions ===
From April to October the Society organises a number of excursions to sites of geological interest. Each trip is led by someone with a special knowledge of the locality.

== Awards ==
The Society annually awards the Clough Medal to a scientist who has either contributed to the understanding of geology in Scotland and the north of England, or a geologist from that area who has made a significant contribution to geology internationally.
