= Murray Macgregor =

Scottish geologist

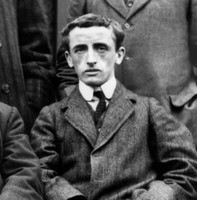
Macgregor in 1914

George Murray Macgregor FRSE (21 January 1884 – 21 January 1966) was a Scottish geologist. He was described as "Scotland's most eminent coalfield geologist."

== Life ==
Macgregor was born in Glasgow to Agnes Murray and George Macgregor. He studied at the University of Glasgow graduating in 1908 with a MA BSc. He joined HM Geological Survey and worked there for his entire career. In 1921, he succeeded L. W. Hinxman as District Geologist for the Scottish coalfields. In 1922, he was elected a Fellow of the Royal Society of Edinburgh. His proposers were John Horne, Ben Peach, Thomas James Jehu, and Robert Campbell. In 1925, he became assistant director for Scotland. The University of Glasgow awarded him an honorary doctorate (DSc) in 1931.

In 1926 he succeeded George Walter Tyrrell as President of the Geological Society of Glasgow. He was succeeded in turn by James Ernest Richey.

He was awarded the Murchison Medal of the Geological Society of London in 1941, and he won the Clough Medal in 1945.

He retired in the autumn of 1945 and was succeeded at the HM Geological Survey by Talbot Whitehead. He died in Glasgow on 21 January 1966. He did not marry and had no children.
