= A. E. Trueman =

British geologist

- Born: Arthur Elijah Trueman; 26 April 1894
- Died: 5 January 1956 (aged 61)
- Awards: Bigsby Medal (1939); Wollaston Medal (1955); Fellow of the Royal Society
- Scientific career
- Fields: Geology

Sir Arthur Elijah Trueman KBE FRS FRSE FGS (26 April 1894 – 5 January 1956) was a British geologist.

== Life ==
Trueman was born in Nottingham, the son of Elijah Trueman, a lacemaker, and his wife Thirza Newton Cottee.

He was educated at High Pavement School in Nottingham from 1899 to 1911, then became a student teacher at Huntington Street School, Nottingham. He entered University College Nottingham in 1912 with a grant as a teacher in training, and studied Geology under H. H. Swinnerton, graduating B.Sc. with first-class honours in 1914. He gained an M.Sc. in 1916 and doctorate (D. Sc.) in 1918, all from University College Nottingham.

Trueman's first academic post was as Assistant Lecturer at University College, Cardiff, from late 1917 until 1920. From 1920 on, he was lecturer and head of the Department of Geology at the newly established University College, Swansea, and was appointed Professor of Geology and head of the Department of Geography in 1930. In 1933, he was appointed Channing Wills Professor of Geology at the University of Bristol, where he also served as Dean of the Faculty of Science for three years. Amongst his students at that time was the young future Professor L. R. Moore. In 1937, he was appointed chair of geology at the University of Glasgow until 1946, when he was succeeded by his student Neville George.

In 1938 he was elected a Fellow of the Royal Society of Edinburgh. His proposers were John Walton, George Tyrrell, John Weir and James Kendall. In 1942 he was also elected a Fellow of the Royal Society of London.

From 1946 until 1953 he served on the University Grants Committee, and was chair from 1949. From 1945 to 1947, he was president of the Geological Society of London. He also served as chairman of the British Association Committee on the Teaching of Geology in Schools, as president of the Geological Section of the Bristol Naturalists' Society, and president of the Glasgow Geological Society.

He was knighted by King George VI in 1951.

He died in London on 5 January 1956.

== Family ==
In 1920, he married Florence Kate Offler.

== Recognition ==
- 1925 Murchison Fund, Geological Society of London
- 1934 Gold Medal, South Wales Institute of Engineers
- 1938 Fellow, Royal Society of Edinburgh
- 1939 Bigsby Medal, Geological Society of London
- 1942 Fellow of the Royal Society
- 1951 KBE
- 1955 Wollaston Medal, Geological Society of London

He received four honorary LL.D. degrees, from Glasgow, Rhodes, Wales, and Leeds.

== Works ==
- An Introduction to Geology. London, Thos. Murby & Co, 1938.
- The Scenery of England and Wales. London, Gollancz, 1938.

Later revised by Whittow J. B. & Hardy J. R. and republished as:

- Geology and Scenery in England and Wales. Harmondsworth, Penguin books, 1971. ISBN 0-14-020185-8
