= John Walter Gregory =

British geologist and explorer

John Walter Gregory, FRS
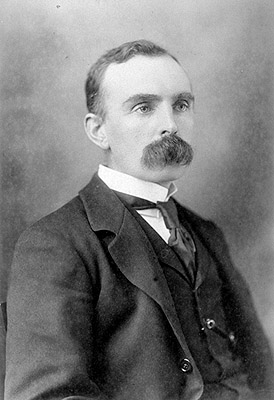
- Born: 27 January 1864; Bow, London
- Died: 2 June 1932 (aged 68); Megantoni Rapids, Urubamba River, Peru
- Occupations: Geologist and explorer
- Awards: Bigsby Medal (1905)

John Walter Gregory, FRS, FRSE, FGS (27 January 1864 – 2 June 1932) was a British geologist and explorer, known principally for his work on glacial geology and on the geography and geology of Australia and East Africa.

The Gregory Rift in the Great Rift Valley is named in his honour.

== Early life ==
Gregory was born in Bow, London, the only son of a John James Gregory, a wool merchant, and his wife Jane, née Lewis. Gregory was educated at Stepney Grammar School and at 15 became a clerk at wool sales in London. He later took evening classes at the Birkbeck Literary and Scientific Institution (now Birkbeck, University of London). He matriculated in 1886, graduated BSc with first-class honours in 1891 and D. Sc. (London) in 1893. In 1887, he was appointed an assistant in the geological department of the Natural History Museum, London.

== Career ==
Gregory was the first to mount a specifically scientific expedition to the mountain. He made some key observations about the geology which still stand. He made the first known attempt to climb the mountain, penetrating the montane forest zone and climbing past the Afro-alpine moorland to the glaciers, rocks and snow. The Gregory Glacier, of which little now remains, on the North side of the mountain, was named after him. Although he never saw this glacier he named the Lewis, Darwin, Heim, Forel and Tyndal Glaciers after eminent Victorian scientists.

Gregory's polar and glaciological work led to his brief selection and service in 1900–1901 as director of the civilian scientific staff of the Discovery Expedition. The expedition was in planning during this period, and had not yet set sail for Antarctica when Gregory was compelled to resign from his position upon learning that he was outranked by the expedition's commander, Robert Falcon Scott.

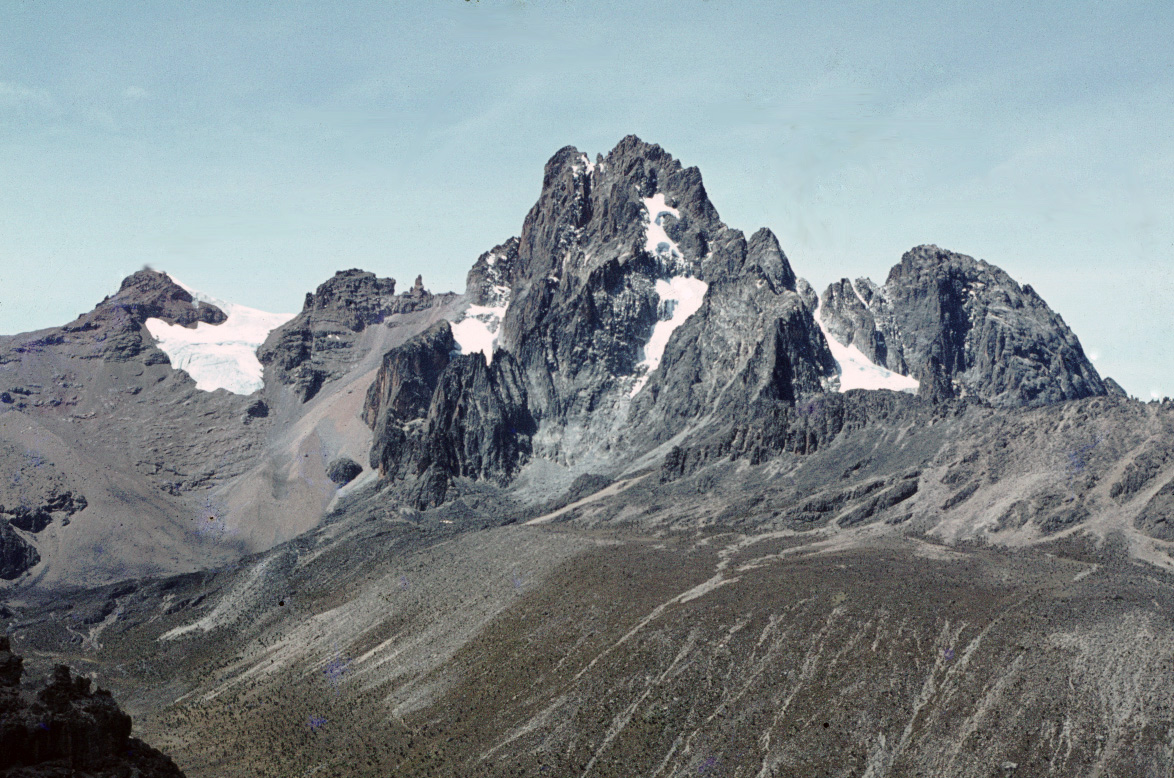
The North side of Mount Kenya with the Gregory Glacier, as it was in 1973, on the left

=== Glasgow ===
In 1904, Gregory was awarded the chair in Geology at Glasgow University winning against Thomas James Jehu, Philip Lake and others. In 1905, he was elected a Fellow of the Royal Society of Edinburgh. His proposers were Sir John Graham Kerr, John Horne, Ben Peach, and Lionel Wordsworth. He served as the Society's vice president from 1920 to 1923 and won their Keith Prize for 1921–23. His students included John Vernon Harrison who was greatly impacted by Gregory.

After his retirement in 1929, he was succeeded by Sir Edward Battersby Bailey (Glasgow chair in geology 1929–1937). His other books on geology and geography include:

- Geography: Structural Physical and Compartitive (1908)
- Geology (Scientific Primers Series) (1910)
- Gregory, J. W. (1912). The Making of the Earth. H. Holt and Company.
- The Nature and Origin of Fiords (1913)
- Geology of To-Day (1915)
- Gregory, J. W. (1916). Australia. G. P. Putnam's Sons., in the Cambridge manuals of science and literature
- The Rift Valleys and Geology of East Africa (1921), a continuation of the studies contained in his volume published in 1896
- The Elements of Economic Geology (1927)
- General Stratigraphy (in collaboration with B. H. Barrett) (1931)
- Dalradian Geology (1931)

He wrote books in other subjects as well, such as The Story of the Road (1931), and he dabbled in eugenics with The Menace of Colour (1925) and Human Migration and the Future (1928).

== Death ==
In January 1932 Gregory went on an expedition to South America. The expedition, sponsored by the Royal Geographical Society in London, made the first geological traverse of the central Andes of Peru. His boat overturned and he was drowned in the Urubamba River in southern Peru on 2 June 1932. One of his companions on this expedition was the diplomat, artist and author Victor Coverley-Price who painted extensively whilst on the expedition. He was in Gregory's canoe and narrowly escaped death when it overturned and later wrote about the expedition in his own autobiography and for the Royal Geographical Society.

== Legacy ==
=== Honours ===
The Gregory Rift in the Great Rift Valley is named in his honour. He visited central Kenya in 1893 and again in 1919 and his 1896 book The Great Rift Valley is considered a classic. He was the first to use the term "rift valley", which he defined as "a linear valley with parallel and almost vertical sides, which has fallen owing to a series of parallel faults". The mineral gregoryite, first found in the Great Rift Valley, is named after him.

=== Racial views ===
Gregory held scientific racist, eugenicist and white supremacist views based on Galtonism and the belief that opposition to cross-breeding in animals could be applied to miscegenation. In 1931, with Sir Arthur Keith, he delivered the annual Conway Hall lecture entitled Race as a Political Factor. The lecture contained as its abstract: "The three primary racial groups within the human species are the Caucasian, mongoloid and negroid. From analogy with cross-breeding in animals and plants, and from experience of human cross-breeding, it can be asserted that inter-marriage between members of the three groups produces inferior progeny. Hence racial segregation is to be recommended. However, the different races can still assist, and co-operate with, each other, in the interests of peace and harmony."

== Family ==
Gregory married Audrey Chaplin, daughter of the Rev. Ayrton Chaplin, and had a son and a daughter.

== Selected works ==
- The living races of mankind: a popular illustrated account of the customs, habits, pursuits, feasts and ceremonies of the races of mankind throughout the world By Henry Neville Hutchinson, John Walter Gregory, Richard Lydekker (1902) D. Appleton.
- The Living Races of Mankind By Richard Lydekker, Henry Neville Hutchinson, John Walter Gregory (1985) Mittal Publications Volume 2
- Gregory, J. W. (1906). The Dead Heart of Australia: A Journey Around Lake Eyre in the Summer of 1901–1902, with some account of the Lake Eyre basin and the flowing wells of central Australia. J. Murray. p. 384 pages.
- Gregory, J.W. 1911. The terms "Denudation," "Erosion," "Corrosion," and "Corrasion". The Geographical Journal 37(2):189–195.
- Gregory, J.W. 1914. The lake system of Westralia. The Geographical Journal 43(6):656–664.
- Gregory, J.W., Evans, J.W., Lamplugh, Mr. and Freshfield, D. 1917. Erosion and resulting land forms in sub-arid Western Australia, including the origin and growth of dry lakes: discussion. The Geographical Journal 50(6):434–437.

=== Biography ===
Leake, B. E. 2011. The Life and Work of Professor J. W. Gregory FRS (1864– 1932): Geologist, Writer and Explorer. Geological Society, London, Memoirs, 34., ISBN 1-86239-323-0 and ISBN 978-1-86239-323-3

== Archives ==
The archives for John Walter Gregory are maintained by the Archives of the University of Glasgow (GUAS).
