= Edward Battersby Bailey =

English geologist (1881–1965)

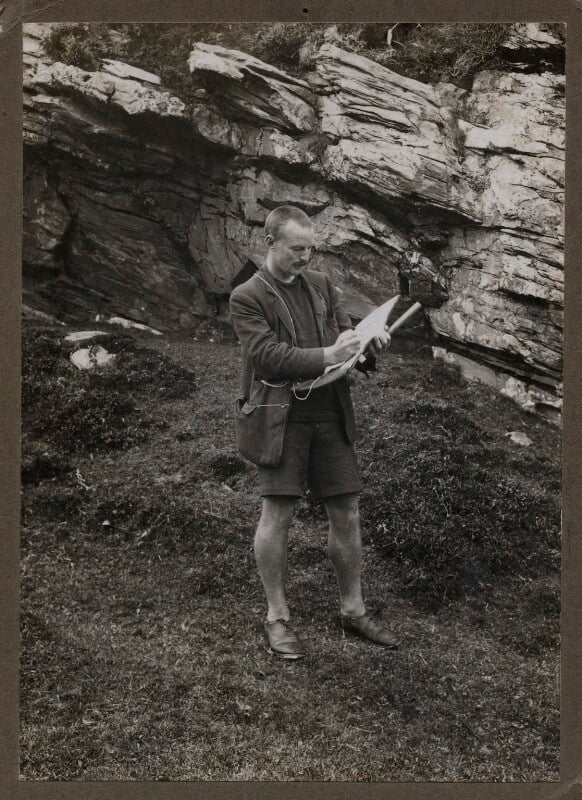
Bailey, c. 1910

Sir Edward Battersby Bailey FRS FRSE MC (1 July 1881 – 19 March 1965) was an English geologist.

== Life ==
Bailey was born in Marden, Kent, the son of Dr James Battersby Bailey and Louise Florence Carr.

He was educated at Kendal grammar school and Clare College, Cambridge. He gained first-class honours in both parts one and two of the natural sciences tripos. He also won a heavyweight boxing medal while at Cambridge. He was appointed a Geologist on the Geological Survey of England and Wales in 1902.

From 1915 to 1919 he served as a Lieutenant with the Royal Garrison Artillery and was twice wounded, losing his left eye and much of the use of his left arm. He was awarded the Military Cross in 1916 and the French Croix de Guerre with palms in 1919. He was also made a chevalier of the Légion d'honneur.

He was Vice President of the Royal Society of Edinburgh from 1935 to 1937.

From 1929 to 1937, he held the chair in geology at the University of Glasgow, where he was succeeded by Sir Arthur Elijah Trueman (chair in geology 1937–1946).

He was director of the British Geological Survey from 1937 to 1945.

He was awarded the Bolitho Medal of the Royal Geological Society of Cornwall in 1937, and the Wollaston Medal of the Geological Society of London in 1949.

He was an atheist.

He died in Middlesex Hospital in London. He was cremated at Golders Green Crematorium.

== Family ==
His first wife, Alice Meason, died in 1956. He remarried, to Mary M W Young in 1962.

== Publications ==
- Bailey, Edward Battersby (1916). "The Islay Anticline (Inner Hebrides)". Quarterly Journal of the Geological Society of London. 72 (1–4): 132–164. Bibcode:1916QJGS...72..132B. doi:10.1144/gsl.jgs.1916.072.01-04.10. S2CID 131690507.
- Bailey, Edward Battersby (1935). Tectonic Essays, Mainly Alpine. Clarendon Press.
- Bailey, Edward Battersby; Hartley, Harold Brewer (1960). "Charles Lyell, F. R. S. (1797-1875)". Notes and Records of the Royal Society of London. 14 (1): 121–138. doi:10.1098/rsnr.1959.0007. S2CID 145462218.
- Bailey, Edward (1962). British Men of Science: Charles Lyell. London: Thomas Nelson.
- Bailey, Edward Battersby (1967). James Hutton--the founder of modern geology. Amsterdam: Elsevier.

== Honours and awards ==
Elected a Fellow of the Royal Society in 1930, in 1943 he was awarded its Royal Medal. In 1948 he received the Wollaston Medal of the Geological Society. He was also a foreign member of the national academies of Belgium, India, Norway, Switzerland, and the United States.

Bailey was a knighted in the 1945 New Year Honours and received the accolade from the King on 13 February 1945.
