= Dougal (given name) =

- Gender: Male

Origin
- Origin: Scottish Gaelic
- Meaning: black stranger
- Region of origin: Scotland

Other names
- Related names: Douglas; Dougie; Dugal; Dugald; Dougald; Dubhghall; Dùghall

Dougal is a Scottish masculine given name. It is an Anglicised form of the Scottish Gaelic Dubhghall, or Dùghall. These Gaelic names are composed of the elements: dubh, meaning "black"; and gall, meaning "impostor". The Gaelic names are derived from a byname, said to have referred to a Dane, in contrast to the fairer Norwegians.

Variants of Dougal include Dougald, Dugal, and Dugald. A pet form of Dougal is Dougie.

== People ==
Notable people with the name include:

Dougal

- Dougal M. Buie (1888–1938), American lawyer
- Dougal Butler, British author and retired roadie
- Dougal Dixon (born 1947), Scottish geologist, paleontologist, educator and author
- DJ Dougal (born 1975), British hardcore DJ and producer
- Dougal Drysdale, Scottish fire-safety engineer
- Dougal Goodman, British scientist
- Dougal Graham (1724–1779), Skellat bellman
- Dougal Haston (1940–1977), British mountain climber
- Dougal Howard (born 1996), Australian rules footballer
- Dougal Jerram (born 1969), British geologist and presenter
- Dougal Marchant, British motorcycle designer
- Dougal McNeill (born 1981), New Zealand academic
- Dougal Robertson (1924–1992), Scottish author and sailor
- Dougal Stevenson (born 1942), New Zealand television presenter
- Dougal Wilson (born 1971), English video director

Dougald

- Dougald Campbell (1922–1996), Scottish footballer
- Dougald Currie (1845–1918), Canadian politician
- Dougald Hine (born 1977), British writer
- Dougald Kennedy (1869–1937), Canadian politician
- Dougald D. Kennedy (1879–1941), American politician
- Dougald Lamont (born 1969), Canadian politician
- Dougald MacKinnon (1886–1970), Canadian politician
- Dougald MacPherson (1882–1964), Canadian politician
- Dougald Park, American television and film actor

Dugald

- Dugald Baird (1899–1986), British medical professor
- Dugald Stewart, Lord Blairhall, British Member of Parliament (died 1712)
- Dugald Buchanan (1716–1768), Scottish poet
- Dugald Butler (1862–1926), Scottish minister and author
- Dugald Cameron (born 1939), Scottish artist and industrial designer
- Dugald D. Cameron (1826–1867), 19th century American politician and physician
- Dugald Campbell (1858–1940), Scottish doctor
- Sir Dugald Campbell, 1st Baronet (died 1641), Scottish landowner
- Dugald Carmichael (1772–1827), Scottish botanist
- Dugald Christie (lawyer) (1941–2006), Canadian lawyer
- Dugald Christie (missionary) (1855–1936), Scottish missionary
- Dugald Clerk (1854–1932), Scottish engineer
- Dugald Cowan (1865–1933), British politician
- Dugald Donaghy (1873–1963), Canadian politician
- Dugald Drummond (1840–1912), Scottish steam locomotive engineer
- Dugald MacTavish of Dunardry, 14th Hereditary Chief of Clan MacTavish
- Dugald Galbraith, Scottish footballer
- Dugald C. Jackson (1865–1951), American electrical engineer
- Dugald Bruce Lockhart (born 1968), Anglo-Scottish stage & screen actor, director & writer
- Dugald McTavish Lumsden (1851–1915), British military officer
- Dugald Sutherland MacColl (1859–1948), Scottish watercolour painter
- Dugald MacDonald (born 1950), South Africa international rugby union player
- Dungal MacDouall (born 1250), Scottish nobleman
- Dugald Macfadyen (1867–1936), British clergyman and writer
- Dugald MacFarlane (moderator) (1869–1956), Scottish minister
- Dugald MacIsaac (1901–1961), Scottish chess player
- Dugald Mackichan (1851–1932), Scottish minister & missionary
- Dugald Macpherson (born 1959), British mathematician
- Dugald Malcolm (1917–2000), British diplomat
- Dugald McCarrison (born 1969), Scottish footballer
- Dugald McColl (1846–1915), Canadian politician
- Dugald McDougall (1834–1885), Australian politician
- Dugald McGregor (1890–1948), Australia international rugby league player
- Dugald McInnes (1877–1929), Canadian sport shooter
- Dugald McQuistan (1879–1946), Scottish mathematician
- Dugald Munro (1930–1973), Australian grazier and politician
- Dugald Campbell Patterson (1860–1931), Canadian businessman
- Dugald Poppelwell (1863–1939), New Zealand lawyer
- Dugald Saunders, Australian politician
- Dugald Semple (1884–1964), Scottish advocate and writer
- Dugald Steer (born 1965), English children's writer
- Dugald Stewart (1753–1828), Scottish philosopher and mathematician
- Dugald Stewart (Canadian politician) (1862–1932), Canadian politician
- Dugald Stewart (diplomat) (1921–1984), British diplomat
- Dugald Stewart (Vermont politician) (1821–1870), American politician
- Dugald Thomson (1849–1922), Australian politician
- Dugald Stewart Walker (1883–1937), American illustrator

Other spellings

- Dubhghall mac Ruaidhrí, King of Argyll and the Isles Scotland
- Dubhghall mac Suibhne, 13th-century Scottish landholder
- Dubgall mac Somairle, King of the Isles
- Dúghall of Lorne (1301–1403), Scottish bishop

== Fictional characters ==
- Father Dougal McGuire, a character on Father Ted

== See also ==
- Dougal (disambiguation)
- List of Irish-language given names
