= Fred Anderson =

Fred or Frederick Anderson may refer to:

== Politics ==
- Fred Anderson (Canadian politician) (1878–1951), Canadian politician in Alberta
- Fred W. Anderson, Democrat member of Illinois House of Representatives in 1957
- Fred Anderson (Montana politician) (born 1944), Republican member of the Montana House of Representatives

== Sports ==
- Frederick Anderson (footballer) (1855–1940), Scottish footballer (national team) and businessman (chairman of the Shanghai Municipal Council)
- Fred Anderson (baseball) (1885–1957), Major League Baseball player (Boston Red Sox, Buffalo Bisons and New York Giants)
- Fred Anderson (footballer, born 1886) (1886–1963), Australian rules footballer for Essendon
- Fred Anderson (footballer, born 1931), Australian rules footballer for Fitzroy
- Fred Anderson (rugby league) (1933–2012), South African rugby player
- Fred Anderson (football owner) (died 1997), owned the Sacramento Surge (WLAF) and Sacramento Gold Miners (CFL)
- Fred Anderson (American football) (born 1954), National Football League defensive lineman
- Fred Anderson (cricketer) (born 1994), New Zealand cricketer

== Others ==
- Frederick C. Anderson (1842–1882), private in the American Civil War
- Frederick William Anderson (politician) (1883–1955), civil engineer, rancher and political figure in British Columbia
- Frederick William Anderson (geologist) (1905–1982), British geologist and palaeontologist
- Fred Anderson (musician) (1929–2010), American jazz saxophonist
- Fred Anderson (journalist) (1937–1996), American television news reporter
- Fred D. Anderson (born c. 1945), CFO of Apple Computer
- Fred Anderson (historian) (born 1949), American historian

== See also ==
- Alfred Anderson (disambiguation)
- Fredrik Andersson (disambiguation)
- Freddie Anderson (disambiguation)
- Frederik Andersen (born 1989), Danish ice hockey player
