= Dougall =

Dougall is a surname. Notable people with the surname include:

- Allan H. Dougall (1836–1912), Scottish soldier
- Andy Dougall (1884–1941), Australian footballer
- Anton B. Dougall (born 1952), Maltese chef, writer and television personality
- Ben Dougall (born 1991), Australian cricketer
- Billy Dougall (1895–1966), Scottish football player and manager
- Eric Stuart Dougall (1886–1918), English recipient
- Hugh W. Dougall (1872–1963), American Latter Day Saint hymn writer and missionary
- James Dougall (1810–1888), Scottish politician
- John Dougall (actor), British actor
- John Dougall (mathematician) (1867–1960), Scottish mathematician
- John Dougall (merchant) (1808–1886), Scottish-born Canadian merchant
- John Dougall (Utah politician) (born 1966), American politician
- John Joseph Dougall (1860–1934), New Zealand politician
- Kenneth Dougall (born 1993), Australian football player
- Lily Dougall (1858–1923), Canadian author and feminist
- Maria Young Dougall (1849–1935), Utah suffragist
- Neil Dougall (1921–2009), Scottish footballer
- Nicolas Dougall (born 1992), South African cyclist
- Rad Dougall (born 1951), South African racing driver
- Peter Dougall (1909–1974), Scottish footballer
- Robert Dougall (footballer) (1910–1988), Scottish footballer
- Robert Dougall (1913–1999), English broadcaster and ornithologist
- Rona Dougall (born 1966), Scottish broadcast journalist and television presenter
- Rose Elinor Dougall (born 1986), English singer, songwriter and musician
- Sean Dougall (born 1989), Irish rugby player
- Tommy Dougall (1921–1997), Scottish football player and manager

== See also ==
- Dougal (disambiguation)
- McDougall (disambiguation)
- Dougall Avenue, is a busy four-lane urban arterial road, linking Downtown Windsor
- Dougall Canal, is a canal in Simcoe County, Ontario, Canada
- Dougall Media, is a Canadian media company
