= F.W. Anderson =

F.W. Anderson may refer to:

- Frederick William Anderson (politician) (1883–1955), civil engineer, rancher and political figure in British Columbia
- Frederick William Anderson (geologist) (1905–1982), British geologist and palaeontologist
- Fred W. Anderson, Democrat member of Illinois House of Representatives in 1957
