= Dugald =

Dugald may refer to:

== People ==
- Dugald (given name), a spelling variation of the Scottish name Dougal

== Places ==
- Dugald, Manitoba, a town in the province of Manitoba, Canada

== See also ==
- Dugal
