= Coward (disambiguation) =

A coward is a person whose excessive fear prevents them from taking a risk or facing danger, exhibiting cowardice.

Coward(s) or The Coward(s) may also refer to:

== Arts and entertainment ==
- The Coward (1915 film), an American silent historical war drama film
- The Coward (1927 film), a lost silent drama film
- The Coward (1939 film), a Mexican war film
- The Coward (1953 film), a Mexican drama film
- The Coward (novel), 2021 novel by Jarred McGinnis
- Coward (2026 film), an upcoming war drama film directed by Lukas Dhont
- Cowards (1970 film), an American drama film
- Cowards (2008 film), a Spanish bullying-themed drama film
- Kapurush (The Coward), 1965 film by Satyajit Ray
- The Cowards, a Czech novel by Josef Škvorecký
- Cowards (comedy troupe), a British four-man comedy act
- Coward (Made Out of Babies album), 2006
- Coward (Haste the Day album)
- Coward (Nels Cline album), 2009
- "Coward", a song by Black Light Burns from Cruel Melody
- "Coward", a song by Bug Hunter from Happiness (Without a Catch)
- "Coward", a song by Jay Chou from the album Yeh Hui-Mei
- "Coward", a song by Swans that originally appeared on Holy Money
- "Coward", a rap song by Chip (rapper)
- Coward-McCann, later Coward, McCann & Geoghegan, an American publisher acquired by G. P. Putnam's Sons
- Cowards (Squid album), 2025

== Other uses ==
- Coward (surname), a surname, and a list of people with the name
- Coward, South Carolina, a town in the US
