= Dougal =

Dougal or Doogal may refer to:

== People ==
- Dougal (given name)
- DJ Dougal (born 1975), British happy hardcore artist

== Fictional characters ==
- Dougal, the dog in the BBC (and ORTF) television series The Magic Roundabout (and its spin-offs)
  - The Magic Roundabout (film), a 2005 film adaption of the television series, known as Doogal in North America
- Father Dougal McGuire, a fictional character in Father Ted
- Dougal MacKenzie in the 1991 Outlander novel and TV series

== Other ==
- Dougal (steam locomotive)

== See also ==
- Dougall
- Dugal
