= John Erlenborn =

American politician (1927–2005)

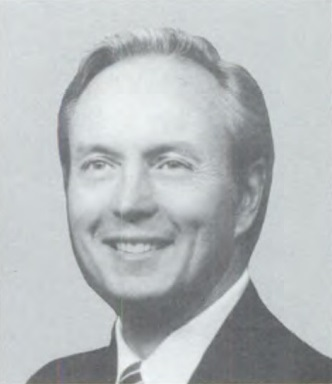

Member of the U.S. House of Representatives from Illinois
- In office January 3, 1965 – January 3, 1985
- Preceded by: Elmer J. Hoffman
- Succeeded by: Harris Fawell
- Constituency: 14th district (1965-1983); 13th district (1983-1985)

Member of the Illinois House of Representatives from the 36th district
- In office January 9, 1957 – November 1964
- Preceded by: H. B. Ihnen; George W. Wilson; Carl H. Wittmond
- Succeeded by: At-large district created

Personal details
- Born: John Neal Erlenborn; February 8, 1927 Chicago, Illinois, U.S.
- Died: October 30, 2005 (aged 78) Warrenville, Illinois, U.S.
- Party: Republican
- Spouse: Dorothy C. Fisher
- Education: Loyola University (LLB)

Military service
- Allegiance: United States
- Branch/service: United States Navy
- Years of service: 1944–1945
- Unit: U.S. Naval Reserve
- Battles/wars: World War II

John Neal Erlenborn (February 8, 1927 – October 30, 2005) was an American lawyer and politician who served as a Republican member of the U.S. House of Representatives from Illinois, representing the 14th (then after 1980s redistricting the 13th) district. In all, he served 10 consecutive terms from 1965 to 1985.

== Biography ==
Born in Chicago, Illinois, Erlenborn attended Immaculate Conception High School (Elmhurst, Illinois), Loyola University Chicago and Loyola University Chicago School of Law.

== Congress ==
He represented his district for twenty years, from January 1965 to January 1985, a period which began with the 89th U.S. Congress. Erlenborn voted against the Voting Rights Act of 1965, but in favor of the Civil Rights Act of 1968. He retired in 1985 after serving in the 98th U.S. Congress.

== Later career ==
He subsequently became an adjunct faculty member of the Georgetown University Law Center, and served as a board member for the Legal Services Corporation from 1989 to 2001.

== Death ==
He died on October 30, 2005, at age 78, after suffering from Lewy body disease.

=== Archives ===
The majority of his papers and other materials created during his time in office are held at the archives of Benedictine University.

Illinois House of Representatives
Preceded by H. B. Ihnen; George W. Wilson; Carl H. Wittmond	Member of the Illinois House of Representatives from the 36th district 1957–1965; Served alongside: Lee E. Daniels, Fred W. Anderson, William A. Redmond, Lewis V. Morgan	Succeeded by At-large district created
U.S. House of Representatives
Preceded by Elmer J. Hoffman	Member of the U.S. House of Representatives from Illinois's 14th congressional district 1965–1983	Succeeded by Tom Corcoran
Preceded by Robert McClory	Member of the U.S. House of Representatives from Illinois's 13th congressional district 1983–1985	Succeeded by Harris Fawell
Preceded by William S. Mailliard	Ranking Member of the House Foreign Affairs Committee; 1973–1975	Succeeded by William Broomfield
Preceded by John M. Ashbrook	Ranking Member of the House Education and Labor Committee; 1983–1985	Succeeded by Jim Jeffords
