= Herbert Bolton =

Herbert Bolton may refer to:

- Herbert Bolton (palaeontologist) (1863–1936), British palaeontologist
- Herbert Eugene Bolton (1870–1953), American historian
