= Coward (surname) =

Coward is a surname. Notable people with the surname include:

- Cedric Coward (born 2003), American basketball player
- Charles Coward (1905–1976), English soldier captured during World War II who claimed to have rescued Jews from Auschwitz
- Chris Coward (born 1989), English football player
- Dena Coward, 21st century Canadian sports event coordinator
- Herbert Coward (1938–2024), American actor
- John Coward (ice hockey) (1910–1989), British ice hockey player, member of the gold medal team at the 1936 Olympics
- John Coward (Royal Navy officer) (1937–2020), British retired vice-admiral
- John Coward, first officer of British Airways Flight 38 which crashed at Heathrow in 2008
- Michael Coward (1945–2003), British geologist
- Mike Coward (born 1946), Australian sports writer
- Noël Coward (1899–1973), English actor, playwright, and composer of popular music
- Pamela Coward, British educator and teacher
- Thomas Coward (1867–1933), English ornithologist and amateur astronomer
- William Coward (1657?–1725), English physician, controversial writer, and poet
- William Coward (merchant) (1648–1738), London merchant and supporter of Dissenters
- William Coward (pirate) (fl. 1689), minor English pirate

== Etymology ==
As a surname (attested from mid-13c.) it represents Old English cuhyrde lit. 'cow-herd'.

== See also ==
- Cowart
