= Nancy Kirk =

Nancy Kirk may refer to:

- Nancy Kirk (geologist)
- Nancy Kirk (politician)
