= Gavazzi Riots =

19th C. riots in Quebec, Canada

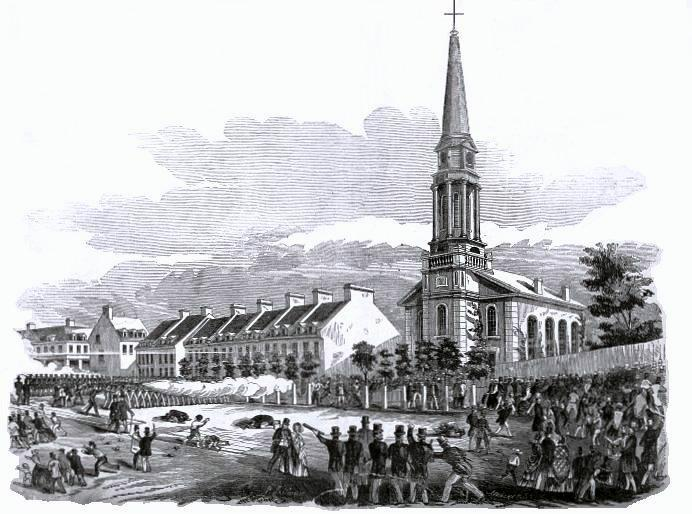
- Engraving, Troops firing on the crowd, Gavazzi Riots, Montreal, QC, 1853, John Henry Walker (1831-1899)
- Location: 46°48′43″N 71°12′18″W 45°30′4.1″N 73°33′42.7″W; Quebec City, Montreal
- Date: June 6 and June 9, 1853 (EST)
- Target: Halls in which Alessandro Gavazzi was lecturing
- Attack type: Forcible entrance
- Weapons: Stones, bludgeons
- Deaths: >5
- Injuries: >10
- Victim: Protestants
- Defender: Charles Wilson

The Gavazzi Riots were disturbances created in Quebec and Montreal in June 1853 by mobs which attacked halls in which ex-Catholic monk Alessandro Gavazzi was lecturing.

== Overview ==
During the spring of 1853 Alessandro Gavazzi, an Italian patriot, visited North America. His lectures at Quebec and Montreal were strongly anti-Catholic; and at both places soldiers had to be called out to restore order. The riots also caused political repercussions.

== Riot in Quebec City ==
On the evening of the June 6th, pursuant to previous announcement, Gavazzi proceeded to deliver a discourse in the Free Presbyterian Church, in St. Ursule Street, on the subject of the Inquisition. A large audience assembled to hear him. When he had been speaking for somewhat more than an hour he was interrupted by violent and abusive exclamations. The interruption was the signal for action on the part of other protestors outside. A volley of stones came crashing through the windows of the church, and immediately afterwards a crowd of persons armed with bludgeons made a forcible entrance into the building.

The principal participants were Irish Catholics who reacted violently to Gavazzi's anti-Catholic sentiments. Gavazzi attributed the failure of the Italian national movement of 1848-49 to the defection of Pope Pius IX from the cause, and therefore rejected Catholicism. The Gavazzi Riot in Quebec was quelled by military forces.

In February 1854, on acquittal of a Quebec rioter, Gavazzi was burned in effigy.

== Riot in Montreal ==
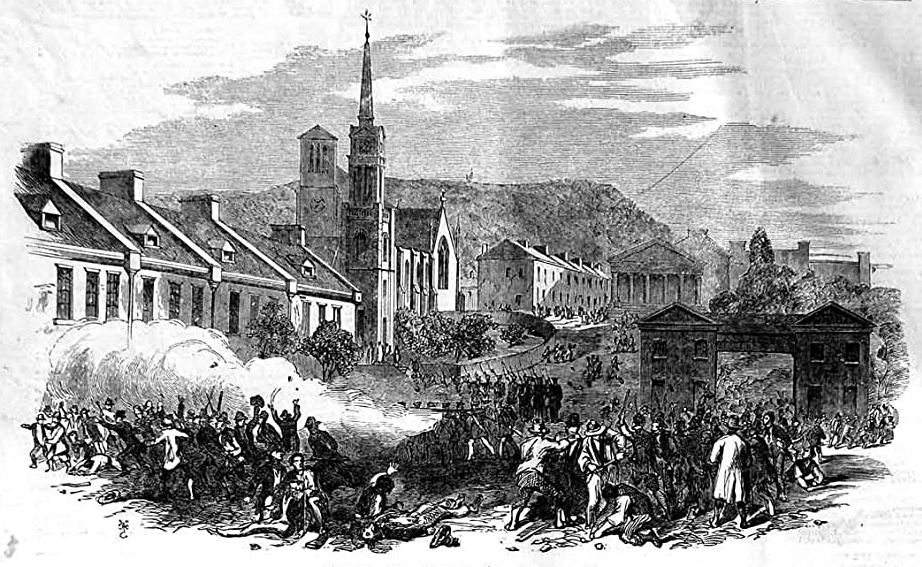
Gavazzi Riot, at Montreal

On June 9, a much more serious affray occurred at Montreal, in consequence of the delivery of a lecture there by Gavazzi. The place of delivery was Zion Church, Haymarket Square. A strong body of police were stationed opposite the church. While the lecture was in progress there was an attempt on the part of a band of Roman Catholic Irish to force their way into the church. A few minutes afterwards the latter returned to the assault, and were again driven back. Charles Wilson, the mayor of the city, invoked the Riot Act. A regiment was on hand at the mayor's request to assist the police. An order was given to fire upon the crowd; the order was obeyed, and five men fell dead. The firing by the troops put an end to aggression on the part of the mob. It is impossible even to approximate the number of the wounded.

During the coroner's inquiry into the riot at Montreal beginning on June 16, it was not possible to determine who had given the order to fire. The jury's report split along sectarian lines: Protestant jurors blamed the mayor, Catholic jurors exonerated him.

Robert McBride included a poetical account of the event in his 1870 book The Canadian Orange Minstrel, entitled "Lines on the Murder of a Number of Protestants, At Zion Church Montreal, Who had Gone to Hear a Reformed Italian Priest Preach—his name was Gavazzi—1853."

The other day, at Zion Church,
In far-famed Montreal, —
Yes, famed for killing Protestants
With powder and with ball, —
'Twas there Rome sent her motley sons,
From every filthy clan,
Who ran like fiery fiends that day
To kill their fellow man.

Those heroes of a spurious creed
(The master piece of sin)
With bricks and stones, with oaths and yells,
Their wrecking did begin.
The Mayor was soon upon the spot.
With soldiers of the line.
Who might have saved the lives of all,
Did they but so incline.

When Protestants saw red coats out,
They thought their friends were near, —
Then left for home in hopes of peace,
Not having any fear;
Until the Mayor gave orders quick
To fire upon the crowd*
Just as it issued from the church,
He of the act seemed proud.

There dying, dead and wounded lay,
Young infants breathed their last,
And aged sires, whose heads were grey —
(Death o'er them all had pass'd,) —
With youthful maidens, bright in life,
These with their mothers lay,
Near to the steps of Zion Church
On that eventful day.

Once liberty of conscience did
Cause Priests in praises join
To celebrate King William's day —
The hero of the Boyne.
This shows when down they know their friends,
But equals makes them foes,
They then would pull the nation down,
And this the whole world knows.

* The Mayor was a Roman Catholic, and knew well on whom to fire.

Protestant journalists such as John Dougall of the Montreal Witness persisted in accusing the mayor for the riots.

The Montreal painter James Duncan depicts the event in his work "Gavazzi riot" (1853).

== See also ==
- List of incidents of civil unrest in Canada
