= John Dougall =

John Dougall may refer to:

- John Dougall (actor), British actor
- John Dougall (mathematician) (1867–1960), Scottish mathematician
- John Dougall (merchant) (1808–1886), Scottish-born Canadian merchant
- John Dougall (politician) (born 1966), American politician
- John Joseph Dougall (1860–1934), mayor of Christchurch, New Zealand
