= List of early Canadian newspapers =

This is a list of early Canadian newspapers. This includes newspapers in all the former colonies now a part of Canada, which published prior to the War of 1812. The earliest Canadian newspaper was the Halifax Gazette which first published on 23 March 1752, followed by other newspapers in what are now the Maritimes and Quebec.

== Canada East (Quebec) ==
- Aylmer
  - Times
  - Ottawa and Pontiac Advertiser
- Drummondville
  - Reporter
- Granby
  - Eastern Townships Gazette
- Montreal
  - Argus
  - Bank-note Reporter
  - Canada Insurance Gazette
  - Canada Temperance Advocate
  - Canadian Mail
  - Canadian Naturalist and Geologist
  - Canadian Presbyterian
  - Canadian Railroad and Steamboat Guide
  - Commercial Advertiser
  - Farmer's Journal
  - Montreal Gazette
  - Grande Ligne Evangelical Register
  - Montreal Herald
  - Journal d'Agriculture
  - Journal de l'Instruction Publique
  - Journal of Education C.E.;Juvenile Presbyterian
  - La Minerve
  - La Patrie
  - L'Avenir
  - Le Pays
  - Liberal Christian
  - Lower Canada Jurist
  - Medical Chronicle
  - Missionary Record
  - Montreal Transcript
  - Montreal Witness
  - New Era
  - Pilot
  - Presbyterian
  - Semeur Canadien
  - True Witness
- Quebec City
  - Le Canadien
  - Quebec Chronicle-Telegraph
  - Chronicle
  - Colonist
  - Courier du Canada
  - Gazette
  - Journal De Quebec
  - Mercury
  - Military Gazette of Canada
  - Le National
  - Sinclair's Monthly Circular
- Richmond
  - County Advocate
- Sorel
  - Gazette de Sorel
- Stanstead
  - Stanstead Journal
- St. Hyacinthe
  - Le Courier
- St. Johns
  - News
  - Frontier Advocate
- Trois Rivières
  - Ère Nouvelle
  - Inquirer
- Waterloo
  - Advertiser

== Canada West (Ontario) ==
- Alliston
  - Herald 1871
- Arnprior
  - Chronicle 1871
- Arthur
  - Enterprise News 1862
- Ayr
  - Observer
- Aurora
  - Banner 1853
- Barrie
  - Herald
  - Northern Advance
- Beaverton
  - Weekly Post
- Belleville
  - Hastings Chronicle
  - Intelligencer
- Berlin (Kitchener)
  - Chronicle
  - Der Deutsche Canadier
  - Berliner Journal
  - Telegraph
- Blenheim
  - Rond Eau News
  - Blenheim News
  - Blenheim World
  - Blenheim Tribune
- Bowmanville
  - Canadian Statesman
  - Star
- Bradford
  - Chronicle
- Brantford
  - Brant County Herald
  - Christian Messenger
  - Courier
  - Expositor
- Brampton
  - Standard
  - Times
- Brighton
  - Christian Banner
  - Weekly Flag
- Brockville
  - Monitor
  - Recorder
- Caledon
  - Enterprise 1888
- Caledonia
  - Grand River Sachem
- Carleton Place
  - Herald
  - Canadian 1876
- Cayuga
  - Sentinel
- Chatham
  - Kent Advertiser
  - Planet
  - Provincial Freeman
- Cobourg
  - Star
  - Sun
- Colborne
  - Northumberland Pilot
  - Transcript
- Collingwood
  - Enterprise
- Cornwall
  - Constitutional
  - Freeholder
- Dundas
  - Warder
  - Star News 1883
- Dunville
  - Independent
- Elora
  - Backwoodsman

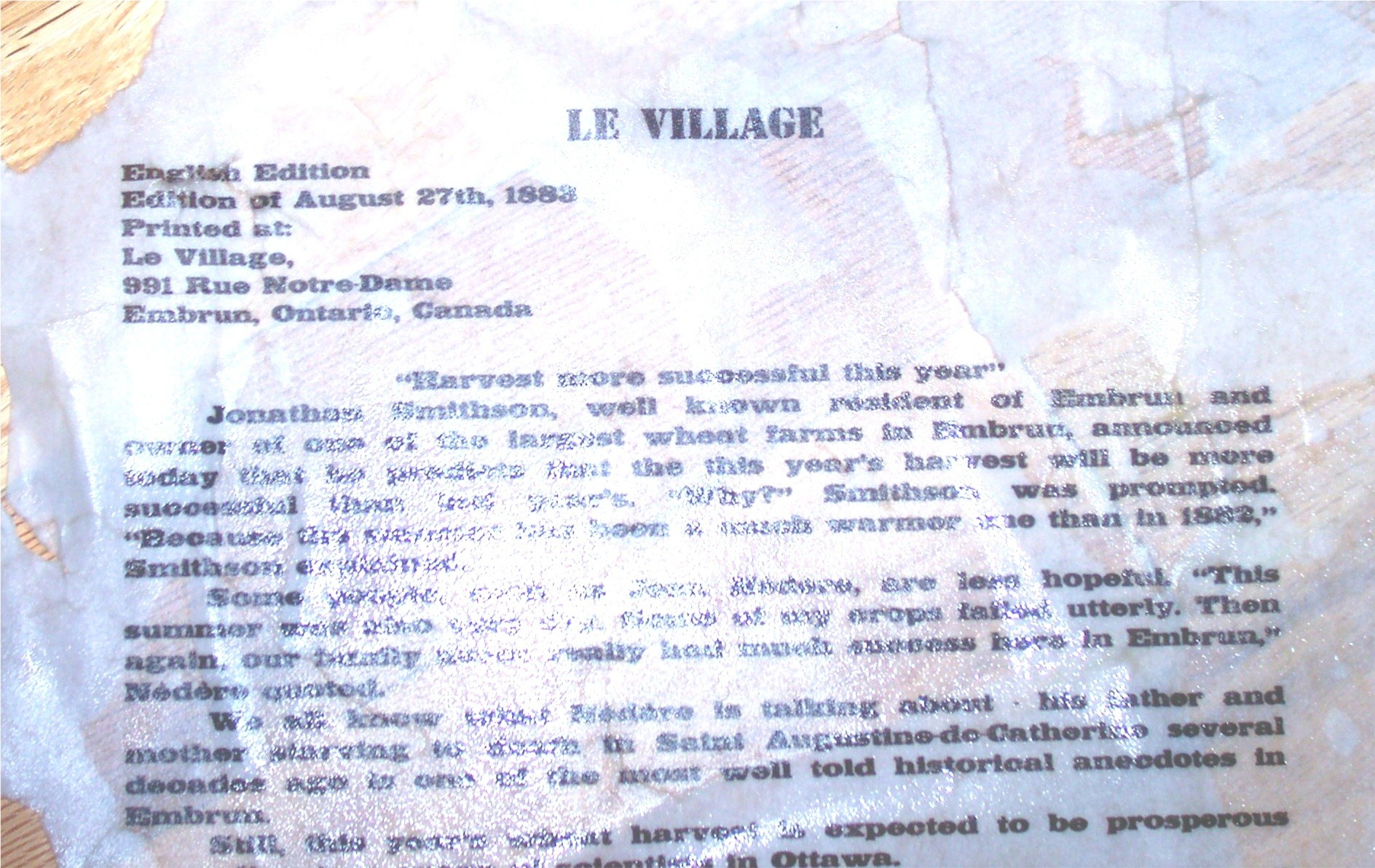
Photo of the remains of a copy of Embrun's Le Village Newspaper's August 27th, 1883 edition.

- Embrun
  - Le Village
- Fergus
  - British Constitution
  - Freeholder
- Forest
  - Forest Free Press
  - Forest Standard
- Fonthill
  - Welland Herald
- Galt
  - Dumfries Reformer
  - Reporter
- Goderich
  - Huron Signal
- Gravenhurst
  - Banner 1866
- Guelph
  - Guelph Advertiser
  - Guelph Chronicle
  - Guelph Herald
  - Guelph Weekly Mercury and Advertiser
  - Guelph Advocate
  - Guelph Daily Mercury 1867
- Hamilton
  - Banner
  - Canada Evangelist
  - Canada Zeitung (German)
  - Canadian Journal of Homeopathy
  - Christian Advocate
  - Journal and Express
  - Spectator c. 1846
- Huntsville
  - Forester c. 1877
- Ingersoll
  - Chronicle
- Kemptville
  - Progressionist
  - Advance
- Kincardine
  - Western Canadian Commonwealth
  - Bruce Reporter
  - Bruce Review
  - Kincardine Standard
  - Kincardine Review
- Kingston
  - British Whig
  - Chronicle and News
  - Commercial Advertiser
  - Daily News
  - Morning Herald
- Lindsay
  - Advocate
- Listowel
  - Banner c. 1866
  - Standard 1878
  - Atwood Bee 1890-1923
- London
  - Atlas
  - Canadian Free Press
  - Evangelical Witness
  - Prototype
- Markham
  - Economist c. 1856 - now Markham Economist & Sun
  - Sun c. 1881
- Millbrook
  - Messenger
- Merrickville
  - Chronicle
  - Freemason's Magazine
- Milton
  - Halton Journal
- Milverton
  - Sun 1891-1992
- Mitchell
  - Advocate 1860
- Napanee
  - Reformer, Standard
- New Hamburg
  - Neutrale
  - Independent 1878
- Newburg
  - Index
- New Castle
  - Recorder
- Newmarket
  - New Era c. 1853
- Niagara
  - Gleaner and Niagara Newspaper
  - Mail
  - Upper Canada Guardian; or Freeman's Journal
- Oakville
  - Sentinel
- Omemee
  - Warder
- Orangeville
  - Banner c. 1893
- Orono
  - Day Dawn
  - Sun
- Oshawa
  - Christian Offering, Vindicator
- Ottawa
  - Bytown Gazette
  - Canada Military Gazette
  - Citizen
  - Railway and Commercial Times
  - Tribune
- Owen Sound
  - Times
- Paris
  - Star
  - Parry Sound
  - North Star c. 1874
- Pembroke
  - Observer
- Penetangore
  - Western Canadian Commonwealth
- Perth
  - Bathurst Courier c. 1834 - now Perth Courier
  - British Standard
- Peterborough
  - Examiner
  - Review
- Picton
  - Gazette
  - Times
- Port DOver
  - Express
- Port Hope
  - Atlas
  - Guide
- Port Perry
  - The Star c. 1866
- Prescott
  - Conservative Messenger
  - Telegraph
- Preston
  - Zeitung
- Renfrew, Ontario
  - Mercury c. 1871
- Richmond Hill
  - York Ridings Gazette
- Russell
  - Russell Reader
- Sandwich
  - British Canadian
  - Voice of the Fugitive
  - Maple Leaf
  - Windsor Herald
- Sarnia
  - CW
  - Observer
  - Lambton Advertiser
- Sherbrooke
  - CE
  - Canadian Times
  - Gazette
- Simcoe
  - Conservative Standard
  - Norfolk Messenger
- Smith Falls
  - Record News c. 1887
- Southampton
  - Morning Star
- Stayner
  - The Sun c. 1877
- Stratford
  - CW
  - Beacon
  - Examiner
  - Perth County News
  - Weekly Herald 1863
- Times 1876-1891
- Streetsville
  - Review
- St. Catharines
  - CW
  - Constitutional
  - Journal
  - Post
- St. Marys
  - Argus c. 1857
  - Journal c. 1893
- St. Thomas
  - Despatch
- Thornhill
  - Liberal c. 1878
- Thorold
  - Gazette
- Toronto
  - Agriculturalist
  - Canada Church Chronicle
  - Canada Gazette
  - Canada Sunday School Advocate
  - Canadian Ecclesiastical Gazette
  - Canadian Independent
  - Canadian Journal
  - Catholic Citizen
  - Christian Guardian
  - Colonial Advocate
  - Colonist (British Colonist)
  - Constitution
  - Der Beobachter (The Observer)
  - Ecclesiastical and Missionary record
  - Echo, and Protestant Episcopal Recorder
  - Gospel Tribune
  - Toronto Globe
  - Journal of Education
  - Toronto Leader
  - Market Review and Weekly Price Current
  - Merchant's Magazine
  - Toronto Mirror
  - Toronto News (Afternoon News)
  - Toronto Patriot
  - Toronto Times
  - Toronto Weekly Message
  - Union Baptist
  - United Presbyterian Magazine
  - Upper Canada Law Journal
- Walkerton
  - Herald-Times c. 1861
- Wingham, Ontario
  - Wingham Advance Times c. 1871
  - York Observer
- Waterloo
  - Farmer's Friend (German)
- Record c. 1878
- Whitby
  - Chronicle
  - Commonwealth
  - Ontario Reporter
- Windsor
  - Churchman's Friend
- Woodstock
  - Gazetteer
  - Sentinel
  - Times
- Vankleek Hill

The Review c.1893

== New Brunswick ==
- Saint John
  - The Royal St. John Gazette, 1783–1784
  - Nova Scotia Intelligencer, 1783–1784
  - The Royal Gazette, 1785–1814
  - St. John Advertiser, 1785–1814
  - The Saint-John Gazette, 1786–1799
  - The Saint John Gazette, 1803–1807
  - The Time; or True Briton, 1808–1810

== Nova Scotia ==
- Halifax
  - Halifax Gazette, 1752

== See also ==
- History of Canadian newspapers
