= Montreal Witness =

Protestant newspaper published in Quebec

The Montreal Witness
- Founder: John Dougall
- Editor: John Dougall
- Founded: 1845
- Ceased publication: 1938
- Political alignment: liberal
- Language: English
- Headquarters: Montreal

The Montreal Witness was an English-language Protestant newspaper published in Montreal from 1845 to 1938.

== Mission and Purpose ==
The Montreal Witness was founded in 1845, by John Dougall. In the December 15, 1845 edition of the Witness, Dougall explained why he began his paper. Society needed a general religious and literary newspaper. His friends in various evangelical denominations assisted him in making the Witness a reality. The Journal intended to "witness for the truth in love." Dougall planned to focus on such topics as Christian Union, Missions, Education, the Efforts of Religious and Benevolent Societies, Public and Social Improvements, Immigration, and Cheap Postage. The Witness would lend its influence for the development of Canada's resources.

Dougall's newspaper presented a variety of information. In the December 15, 1845 edition the lead article was entitled, "The History of the Reformation in the Sixteenth Century" by Dr. Merle D’Augbigne. This was followed by articles entitled, "Sabbath School Teaching" (a sermon); "Vestiges of the Natural History of Creation," ( a reprint from the Edinburgh Witness of the ‘Infidel’ work). Some of the articles were of general interest such as "The Fruit Trees of America," (An extract from the book by A. J. Downing mostly about 'The Apple.' The Witness also reported the news, sometimes with extensive commentary while other items were mentioned just briefly. The news of the December 15, 1845 paper included: a lengthy report of the 'Liverpool Conference on Christian Union', 'Partial Failure of the Crops', Railway Mania (Difficulties in the railway business), 'The War in Algiers', 'The New German Reformation', and 'The President’s Message' (re: Canada/USA relations and the Oregon dispute). There were sections for letters to the editor, birth and death announcements, etc.

By 1886, the Montreal Witness, was known as "the only religious daily." It was published as an evening newspaper. According to Argyll, the Witness wielded a powerful influence among the Protestant population of Montreal and the province of Quebec. It was respected by all classes and creeds in the community, and was noted as a strong supporter of the temperance movement. Its circulation was said to be between fourteen and fifteen thousand daily.

== The Witness and the Temperance Movement ==
Letitia Youmans of Picton, Ontario mentioned that the Montreal Witness was one of their home papers in 1850. She said the Witness consistently supported the temperance cause.

== The Protestant/Catholic Divide ==
The newspaper was intentionally Protestant. Its opposition to the teachings and practices of the Roman Catholic Church were often frank and undiplomatic. For example, John Dougall persisted in blaming the mayor of Montreal, Charles Wilson, for the Gavazzi Riots. In the December 15, 1845 edition, one letter to the editor expressed intense anti-Roman Catholic sentiment.

In the 1870s, the Montreal Witness published the lectures of Father Chiniquy, a Canadian Catholic priest who left the Catholic Church and became a Protestant. Chiniquy credits the owner of the Montreal Witness, John Dougall, for helping him make the transition. In response to Chiniquy's lectures appearing in the Witness, on March 26, 1875, the Catholic Church forbade the reading of the Montreal Witness. The Bishop of Montreal issued a pastoral letter endorsed by the Archbishop of Quebec. The Sacrament was to be withheld from all who did not obey.

== See also ==
- List of early Canadian newspapers
- List of newspapers in Canada
