= Cowart =

Cowart is a surname. Notable people with the surname include:

- Byron Cowart (born 1996), American football player
- Daniel Cowart, man suspected of a plot to assassinate Barack Obama in 2008
- Dax Cowart (1947–2019), attorney noted for the ethical issues raised by efforts to sustain his life against his wishes
- Delma Cowart (1941–2021), American stock car racing driver
- Donald Cowart (born 1985), American steeplechase runner
- Gwendolyne Cowart (1920–2003), American pilot during World War II
- Kaleb Cowart (born 1992), American baseball player
- Sam Cowart (born 1975), former American football linebacker
- Shea Cowart, American sprinter

== See also ==
- A muscadine (Vitis rotundifolia) cultivar
