= The Murchison Fund =

Award from the Geological Society of London

The Murchison Fund is an award granted by the Geological Society of London honoring researchers under the age of 40 who made significant contributions to the study of tectonic geology and hard rock. It received the name in recognition of Prof. Roderick Impey Murchison.

== Recipients ==
Source: Murchison Fund, The Geological Society

- 2025 Francesca Willcocks
- 2024 Lara Mani
- 2023 Penny Wieser
- 2022 Simon Matthews
- 2021 Andrew Thomson
- 2020 Alexander Dunhill
- 2019 Jonathan Pownall
- 2018 George Cooper
- 2017 Sami Mikhail
- 2016 Craig Magee
- 2015 Sebastian Watt
- 2014 Katherine Joy
- 2013 Alison Rust
- 2012 Russell Wynn
- 2011 Sarah Sherlock
- 2010 No award made
- 2009 Howard Falcon-Lang
- 2008 Arwen Deuss
- 2007 Glenn Milne
- 2006 Dougal Jerram
- 2005 Peter Clift
- 2004 Kenneth McCaffrey
- 2003 No award made
- 2002 Philip Donoghue
- 2001 No award made
- 2000 No award made
- 1999 Nick Petford
- 1998 Jonathan David Blundy
- 1997 Timothy Harvey Druitt
- 1996 Marian Barbara Holness
- 1995 Timothy Holland
- 1994 Graham Barry Shimmield
- 1993 Michael Anthony Lovell
- 1992 Kenneth Ronald McClay
- 1991 Donald Herbert William Hutton
- 1990 D G Smith
- 1989 A Mackenzie
- 1988 A D Saunders
- 1987 Richard J. Howarth
- 1986 Colin McClellan Graham
- 1985 Jane Anne Plant
- 1984 Nigel Howard Woodcock
- 1983 Geoffrey Charles Brown
- 1982 Richard Barrie Rickards
- 1981 Andrew Harry Gordon Mitchell
- 1980 Michael Peter Coward
- 1979 John Tamey
- 1978 William David Ian Rolfe
- 1977 John Charles Mowbray Taylor
- 1976 Anthony Leonard Harris
- 1975 Richard Curtis Selley
- 1974 Denys Barker Smith
- 1973 Frank Moseley
- 1972 Harold Gamar Reading
- 1971 John Frederick Dewey
- 1970 Arthur Clive Bishop
- 1969 Anthony Hallam
- 1968 Ronald Keith Harrison
- 1967 Frederick Weir Dunning
- 1966 John G. Ramsay
- 1965 Isles Strachan
- 1964 Rupert William Roye Rutland
- 1963 Edward Howel Francis
- 1962 Frank Hodson
- 1961 Jack Ineson
- 1960 Derek Victor Ager
- 1959 Desmond Thomas Donovan
- 1958 Geoffrey Bond
- 1957 John Weaver Pallister
- 1956 William Walker Black
- 1955 Raymond Casey
- 1954 Nancy Kirk
- 1953 Cameron Darrell Ovey
- 1952 Norman Leslie Falcon
- 1951 Thomas Deans
- 1950 Henry Dighton Thomas
- 1949 Stuart Olof Agrell
- 1948 Frederick Wolverson Cope
- 1947 Duncan Leitch
- 1946 Alan Wood
- 1945 William Alexander Deer
- 1944 Gerald Murray Stockley
- 1943 Arthur George Davis
- 1942 Kingsley Charles Dunham
- 1941 John Weir
- 1940 Archibald Gordon MacGregor
- 1939 Arthur Lennox Coulson
- 1938 Frank Coles Phillips
- 1937 Stephen Henry Straw
- 1936 Emily Dix
- 1935 John Vernon Harrison
- 1934 J. Wilfrid Jackson
- 1933 Talbot Haes Whitehead
- 1932 Alfred Kingsley Wells
- 1931 Cyril James Stubblefield
- 1930 John Smith
- 1929 Leslie Reginald Cox
- 1928 George Slater
- 1927 Sidney H. Haughton
- 1926 William Sawney Bisat
- 1925 Arthur Elijah Trueman
- 1924 Leonard Frank Spath
- 1923 Thomas H Withers
- 1922 Herbert Bolton
- 1921 Albert Gilligan
- 1920 David Woolacott
- 1919 Eleanor Mary Reid
- 1918 Thomas Crook
- 1917 William Mackie
- 1916 George Walter Tyrrell
- 1915 David Cledlyn Evans
- 1914 Frederick Nairn Haward
- 1913 Ernest E L Dixon
- 1912 Arthur Morley Davies
- 1911 Edgar Sterling Cobbold
- 1910 John Walker Sather
- 1909 James Vincent Elsden
- 1908 Ethel Gertrude Skeat
- 1907 Felix Oswald
- 1906 Herbert Lapworth
- 1905 Herbert Lister Bowman
- 1904 Arthur Hutchinson
- 1903 Elizabeth Gray
- 1902 Thomas Henry Holland
- 1901 Thomas Sergeant Hall
- 1900 A. Vaughan Jennings
- 1899 James Bennie
- 1898 Jane Longstaff
- 1897 Sydney S. Buckman
- 1896 Phillip Lake
- 1895 Albert Seward
- 1894 George Barrow
- 1893 Griffith John Williams
- 1892 Beeby Thomas
- 1891 Richard Baron
- 1890 Edward B. Wethered
- 1889 Grenville Cole
- 1888 Edward Wilson
- 1887 Robert Kidston
- 1886 Clement Reid
- 1885 Horace B. Woodward
- 1884 Martin Simpson
- 1883 John Young
- 1882 Thomas Rupert Jones
- 1881 Frank Rutley
- 1880 Robert Etheridge
- 1879 James Walker Kirkby
- 1878 Charles Lapworth
- 1877 John F. Blake
- 1876 James Croll
- 1875 Harry Seeley
- 1874 Ralph Tate
- 1874 Alfred Bell
- 1873 Oswald Heer

== See also ==
- List of geology awards
- Murchison Medal
- Prizes named after people
