= Arwen Deuss =

Dutch geophysicist

Deuss in 2016

Arwen Fedora Deuss (born 1975) is a Dutch geophysicist who uses global seismology to study the Internal structure of Earth in its mantle and core, including the discovery that two large low-shear-velocity provinces ("supercontinents") buried deep within the lower mantle are hotter and older than previously thought. She is a professor in the Faculty of Geosciences and Department of Earth Sciences at Utrecht University, where she holds the title of professor of structure and composition of Earth's deep interior.

== Education and career ==
Deuss received a Drs. degree (the equivalent of a combined bachelor's and master's degree) in earth sciences from Utrecht University in 1998. She continued at the University of Oxford, where she completed a doctorate (D.Phil.) in 2002.

She worked as a lecturer and reader at the University of Cambridge, and as a fellow of Pembroke College, Cambridge, before returning to Utrecht University in 2014. She was named as a full professor at Utrecht in 2017.

== Recognition ==
Deuss was the 2008 winner of the Murchison Fund of the Geological Society of London. She was a 2010 recipient of the Philip Leverhulme Prize. She received the 2015 Ammodo KNAW Award of the Royal Netherlands Academy of Arts and Sciences (KNAW), and the 2020 NWO Athena Award of the Dutch Research Council (NWO).

She was elected to the Royal Netherlands Academy of Arts and Sciences in 2018.
