= Robert James Drummond =

Robert James Drummond (1858–1951) was a Scottish minister who served as Moderator of the General Assembly of the United Free Church of Scotland in 1918. He served as Chaplain to the King (George V) in Scotland.

== Life ==
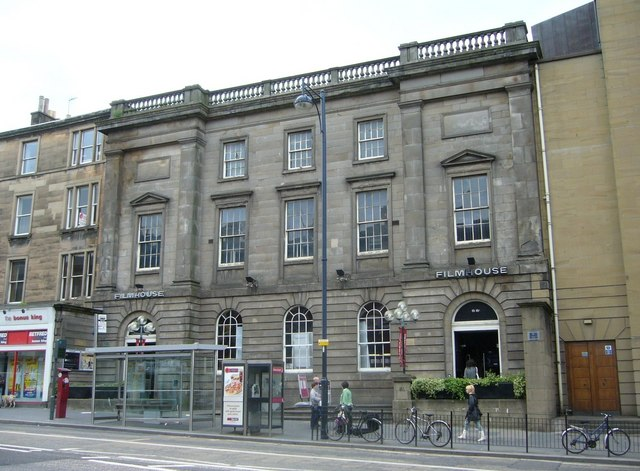
United Free Church on Lothian Road (now Edinburgh Filmhouse)

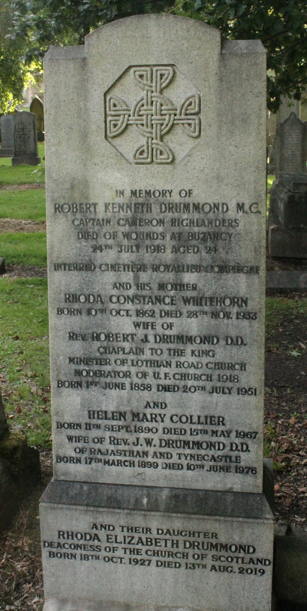
The grave of R. J. Drummond, Grange Cemetery

He was born on 1 June 1858 the son of Rev Robert Skeill Drummond DD of Belhaven United Presbyterian Church in Glasgow, and his wife Jeanie French, daughter of Rev Dr John French DD.

He graduated MA from Glasgow University in 1879 and gained a Bachelor in Divinity (BD) in 1882. He became a minister of the United Presbyterian Church of Scotland with his first ministry being in Kilmarnock. The church was an impressive stone-spired structure on Titchfield Street.

In 1890 he replaced Rev James Aitken at Lothian Road United Presbyterian Church in Edinburgh on a stipend of £500 per annum ( a very healthy salary at that time). Aitken moved to Ryehill UP Church in Dundee. Lothian Road church was a major home to the Edinburgh temperance movement and Drummond was a signed member of the movement. Drummond was assisted at Lothian Road by Mr Henry Brown MA who joined the church only slightly before Drummond. Four elders (David Foulis, James Arnot, Hugh Grieve and Hugh Stoddart) had travelled to Kilmarnock to assess the suitability of Drummond. The local congregation did not appreciate their visit or its purpose of stealing their minister and they were told not to come back again. He was invited to preach to the Lothian Road congregation in July and formally admitted as their minister in December 1890. He was inducted by Mr Hunter of Dalkeith, the then Moderator of the United Presbyterian Church, and Rev Dr Thomson of Broughton Place UP Church. After the induction 100 of the group had a celebration meal at the Cockburn Hotel at the foot of Cockburn Street.

Under Drummond the congregation grew from 960 in 1890 to over 1500 in 1909. Soon after Drummond arrived, in January 1891, Henry Brown left to take over the UP Church at Earlston. He was replaced by Rev Robert Hamilton. Hamilton left in 1892 to take over the UP Church in Grangemouth in lace of Mr Lambie and Hamilton was replaced by Mr John Lewars in February 1893. Lewars went to Lesmahagow in 1895.

In June 1891 the church commissioned MacGibbon & Ross to create new halls to the rear, and began discussing the introduction of instruments into the service (i.e. an organ). The new halls were built 1893/4. However, the project got the church into debt, which had been an ongoing issue since the church's foundation. This was occasionally eased through legacies from former congregation members. Finances were complicated by the closure of the Congregational Library which had run at a loss since the opening of the Carnegie library in the city centre. The Sabbath School Library survived.

In 1895 Drummond organised for electric lights to be installed in the church: one of the first such installations in Edinburgh. This was carried out in 1897 at a cost of £165. Around 1897 the church purchased a Limelight Magic Lantern to begin to give visual bible stories.

In 1896 his senior assistant Rev Dr William Reid DD (1814-1896) died. The funds tangentially released from this death (£100 per annum) allowed Drummond's stipend to increase to £550 and a "Bible nurse" to be employed: a Miss Murray, formerly an urban missionary in Old Calabar.

In 1897 a piano was installed, funded by the Total Abstinence Society who made use of the halls. However, the Church Secretary, Mr Cochrane, received a written complaint from the elders stating he had overstepped his authority in allowing this. Nevertheless, music came to the church.

In October 1900 the United Presbyterian Church merged with part of the Free Church of Scotland creating the United Free Church of Scotland. The Union had been two years in discussion. Drummond's stipend was increased to £600. In 1901 he received an honorary Doctor of Divinity from Glasgow University.

Miss Murray resigned in 1906 and was replaced by Miss Sullivan.

In 1907 he took a trip to the Holy Land and Egypt with his wife and Rev Crerar of North Leith. They also visited Athens and Constantinople and Budapest on the journey home. During his absence preachers at Lothian Road included Marcus Dods.

In December 1909 he resigned his position at Lothian Road to take a chair in Practical Training at the UF College housed in Moray House on the Canongate in Edinburgh.

In 1918 Drummond succeeded Rev Dugald Mackichan as Moderator of the General Assembly, the highest position in the UF Church.

He lived at 29 Chalmers Street near the Edinburgh Royal Infirmary from at least 1895 to 1910.

He died in Edinburgh on 20 July 1951 aged 93. He is buried with his wife in Grange Cemetery in south Edinburgh.

== Family ==
He was married to Rhoda Constance Whitehorn (1862-1933). Their son Captain Robert Kenneth Drummond MC died of wounds serving with the Cameron Highlanders in Buzancy in the First World War.

Their daughter Joan married Rev James Kyd Thomson, minister of North Mayfield Church in Edinburgh.

Their son Rev Dr J W Drummond (1899-1976) married Helen Mary Collier (1890-1967).

His sister Jane Elizabeth Drummond married Joseph H. Whitehorn of London possibly the brother of Rhoda.

== Publications ==
- The Relation of the Apostolic Teaching to the Teaching of Christ (1901)
