= Freddie Anderson =

Freddie Anderson may refer to:

- Freddie Anderson (writer) (1922–2001), Irish writer, playwright, author, poet and socialist.
- Freddie Anderson (soccer) (born 2006), English-American footballer

== See also ==
- Fred Anderson (disambiguation)
