= Charles Wilson (Quebec politician) =

Canadian politician

The Honourable Charles Wilson
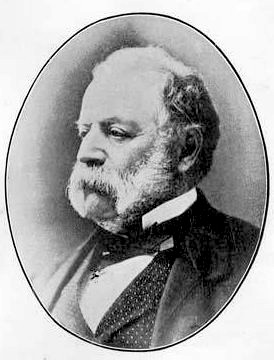

7th Mayor of Montreal
- In office 1851–1854
- Preceded by: Édouard-Raymond Fabre
- Succeeded by: Wolfred Nelson
- Constituency: Centre

Senator for Rigaud, Quebec
- In office 1867–1877
- Appointed by: Royal Proclamation
- Succeeded by: Joseph-Rosaire Thibaudeau

Personal details
- Born: April 1808 Coteau-du-Lac, Lower Canada
- Died: May 4, 1877 (aged 69) Montreal, Quebec, Canada
- Spouse: Ann Tracey
- Relations: Daniel Tracey (brother-in-law)
- Profession: businessman

Charles Wilson (April 1808 – May 4, 1877) was a Canadian businessman and politician.

== Background ==
Wilson was born at Coteau-du-Lac, Quebec, in 1808. He was the son of Alexander Wilson (b.1758), a native of Huntly, Aberdeenshire, who came to Quebec City where he was a merchant, magistrate and later Seigneur of Granville. Wilson's mother, Catherine-Angélique d'Ailleboust de Manthet (1781-1845), was the daughter of Nicholas d'Ailleboust des Musseaux de Manthet (1747-1826), descended from Louis d'Ailleboust de Coulonge, 4th Governor of New France.

Wilson established a hardware business, and became a prosperous and respected merchant near the Montreal waterfront. In 1835, he married Ann Tracey, sister of Daniel Tracey.

== Montreal city politics ==
He served as a City Councillor of Montreal from 1848 to 1849 and from 1850 to 1852 and Mayor of Montreal from 1851 to 1854.

Protestant journalists such as John Dougall of the Montreal Witness persisted in accusing the mayor for the Gavazzi Riots. When in September 1855, at Ignace Bourget's request, Wilson received the cross of commander of the Order of St. Gregory the Great from Pope Pius IX, the Protestant press resumed its accusations against the man responsible for the "St Bartholomew of Montreal."

== Member of the upper house ==
In 1852, he became a member of the Legislative Council of the Province of Canada and, following the creation of the Canadian Confederation in 1867, he was appointed to the Senate of Canada in the new nation's capital Ottawa as a Conservative party representative for the riding of Rigaud.

== Death ==
Charles Wilson is interred in the Notre-Dame-des-Neiges Cemetery in Montreal. He is commemorated by both Wilson Avenue in Notre-Dame-de-Grâce and by rue Charles-Wilson in Mercier-Hochelaga-Maisonneuve.
