= Fredrik Andersson =

Fredrik Andersson may refer to:

- Fredrik Andersson (ice hockey) (born 1968), Swedish ice hockey goaltender
- Fredrik Andersson (footballer, born 1988), Swedish footballer
- Fredrik Andersson (footballer, born 1971), Swedish footballer
- Fredrik Andersson (table tennis) (born 1980), Swedish para table tennis player
- Fredrik Andersson Hed (1972–2021), Swedish golfer and golf commentator

== See also ==
- Fredric Andersson (born 1988), Swedish ice hockey winger
- Frederik Andersen (born 1989), Danish ice hockey goaltender
- Frederick Anderson (disambiguation)
