= Alessandro Gavazzi =

Italian Roman Catholic priest

The Reverend Alessandro Gavazzi
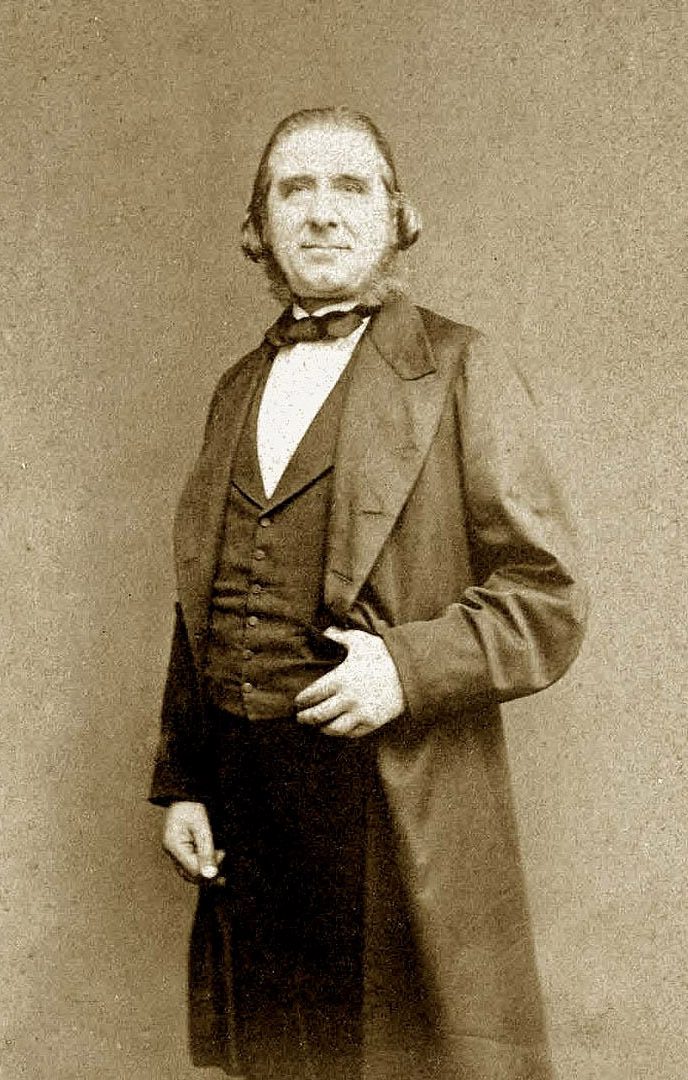
- Born: 21 March 1809; Bologna, Kingdom of Italy
- Died: 9 January 1889 (aged 79); Rome, Kingdom of Italy

Alessandro Gavazzi (21 March 1809 – 9 January 1889) was an Italian Protestant preacher and patriot. Born a Catholic, he at first became a monk and attached himself to the Barnabites at Naples, where he afterwards acted as professor of rhetoric. He later left the Church and became known as a provocative speaker against Catholicism, touring Europe and the United States. Protests against him broke out in Canada in 1853, causing numerous deaths in the Gavazzi Riots.

== Biography ==
In 1840, having already expressed liberal views, he was removed to Rome to fill a subordinate position. Leaving his own country after the capture of Rome by the French, he carried on a vigorous campaign against priests and Jesuits in England, Scotland and North America, partly by means of a periodical, the Gavazzi Free Word.

While in England he gradually went over (1855) to the Evangelical church, and became head and organizer of the Italian Protestants in London. Returning to Italy in 1860, he served as army-chaplain with Giuseppe Garibaldi. In 1870 he became head of the Free Church (Chiesa libera) of Italy, united the scattered Congregations into the Unione delle Chiese libere in Italia, and in 1875 founded in Rome the theological college of the Free Church, in which he himself taught dogmatics, apologetics and polemics. He died in Rome on 9 January 1889, aged 79.

Among his publications are No Union with Rome (1871); The Priest in Absolution (1877); My Recollections of the Last Four Popes, etc., in answer to Cardinal Wiseman (1858); Orations, 2 decades (1851).

== Gavazzi Riots ==
In the spring of 1853, Gavazzi visited North America. Gavazzi Riots were disturbances created in Quebec on 6 June 1853, and in Montreal, on 9 June, by mobs which attacked halls in which Gavazzi was lecturing. His lectures at Quebec and Montreal were strongly anti-Catholic; and at both places the soldiers had to be called out to restore order. At Montreal, 10 lives were lost. The riots also caused political repercussions.
