= James Duncan (artist) =

Canadian artist (1806–1881)

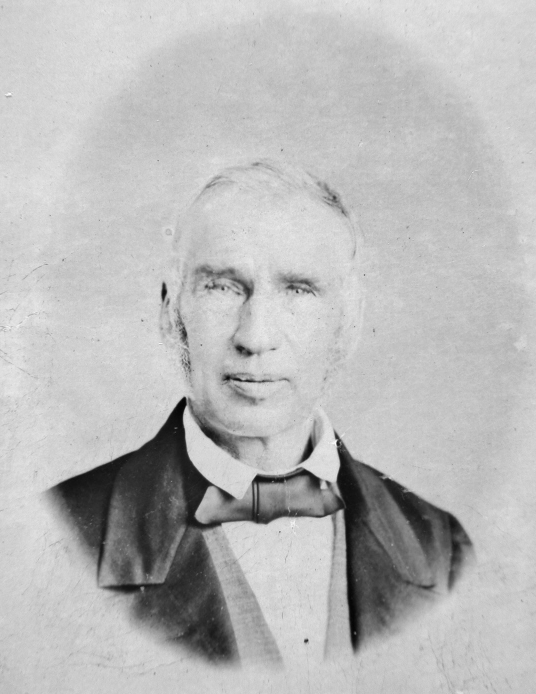
- James Duncan, artist, Montreal, QC, 1863
- Born: James D. Duncan; 1806; Coleraine, Ireland
- Died: September 28, 1881 (aged 74–75); Montreal, Quebec
- Known for: painter, lithographer, and teacher
- Spouse: Caroline Benedict Power (m. 1834)

James D. Duncan (1806 – September 28, 1881), the first Irish artist to emigrate to Lower Canada, is best known as a prolific watercolorist, but he was also a painter in oils, made the first tint-stone lithographs published in Canada, took photographs and created designs for coinage and ornamental printing. He was a painstaking teacher of drawing in several institutions as well as giving private lessons.

He is considered the major chronicler of early Montreal over several decades, particularly for his picturesque topographical views with their accurately recorded architectural detail as in his Montreal from the Mountain (before 1854, McCord Museum).

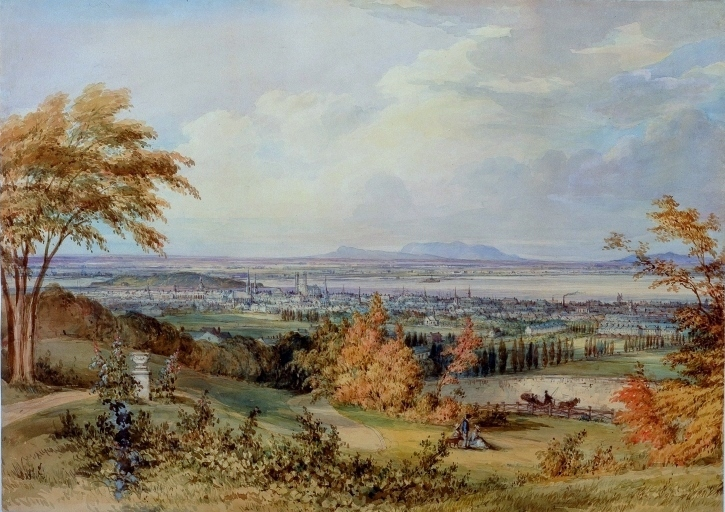
Montreal depuis la montagne - James Duncan - avant 1854

His genre scenes of Montreal recorded sporting events, parades, fires, market vendors, sleighing and ice-cutting, among other subjects such as his Ice Pile, Montreal, in the Peter Winkworth Collection of the Library and Archives Canada.

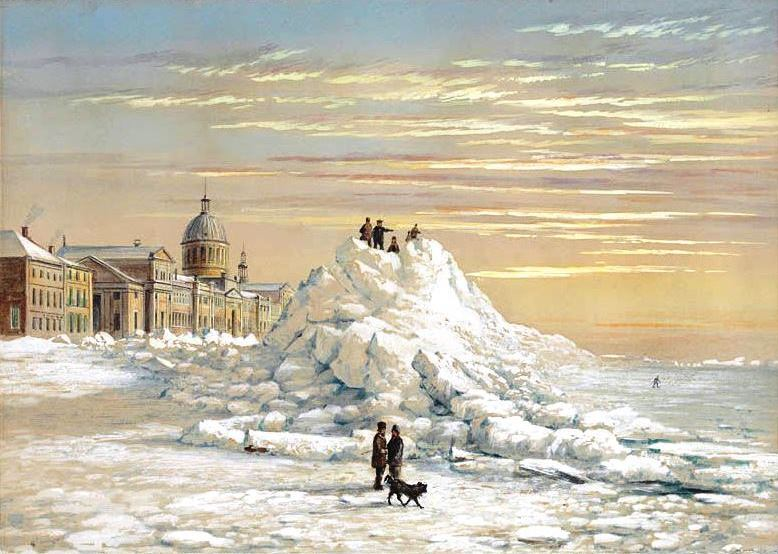
Ice pile Montreal Market Building

His watercolors were used as illustrations in magazines and his work was exhibited in the Great Exhibition of 1851 in London, England. He also painted Canadian political and social events and portraits.

== Early life and career ==
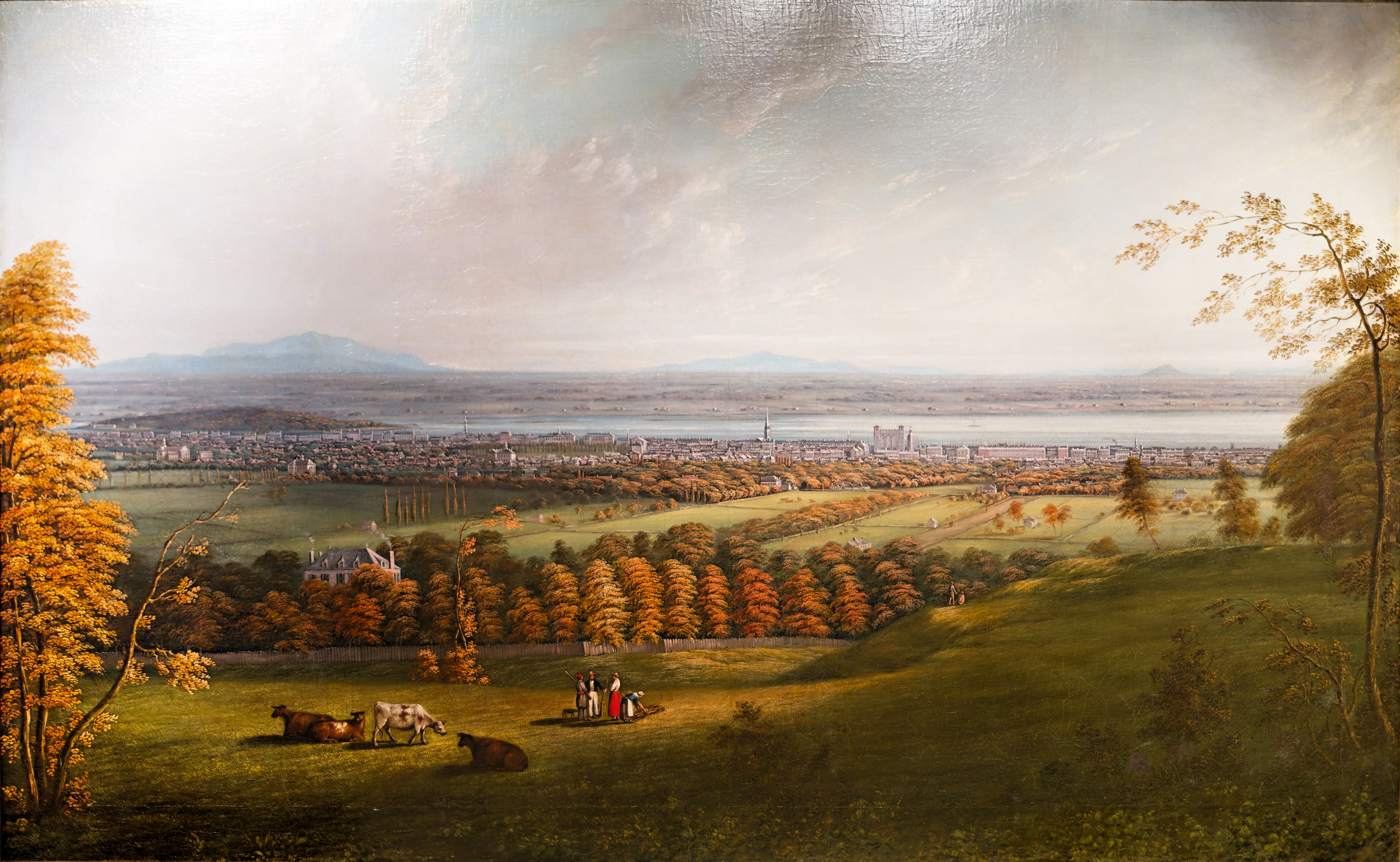
Montréal depuis la montagne (1830-1831) by Duncan

Duncan was born in Coleraine, Northern Ireland and grew up in Ireland where he was trained as an artist. In 1825, he emigrated to Lower Canada. By 1830 he was known in Montreal as an artist and teacher.

Duncan developed from classical ideals influenced by his training to a topographical approach and the Picturesque aesthetic ideal. After the early 1850s, his watercolors became more colorful.

He was a favorite artist of Montreal Mayor Jacques Viger. From 1831 to 1853, Viger commissioned Duncan to make a series of Montreal views (1831) and gave him later commissions for portraits (1839–1845) and illustrations (1845 and 1853). Duncan also produced drawings for Hochelaga Devicta: The Early History and Present State of the City and Island of Montréal (1839), a Montreal guide book.

Among his prints, the most notable set of single-sheet prints are six Montreal views made into lithographs by Duncan in 1843–1844 as in an example of Montreal (from the Mountain) in the National Gallery of Canada. They were the first tint-stone lithographs published in Canada. In 1847, he published a Panoramic view of Montreal.

In 1864, he became involved in Duncan and Company, "lithographic printers and engravers and draughtsmen". In 1879, he went to England and Scotland, and acting as an agent, seems to have purchased works of art for collectors. In 1880, he returned to Montreal where he died late in 1881.

Duncan taught drawing part-time at various Montreal institutions and gave private lessons. He was known as a conscientious teacher.

== Selected public exhibitions ==
Duncan exhibited work at the Great Exhibition in London, England, in 1851, the provincial exhibitions at Montreal (1863–1865), the Art Association of Montreal (1865–1879), the Society of Canadian Artists (1867–1871), and with the Royal Canadian Academy in 1881. A show of his work curated by Laurier Lacroix and Christian Vachon and titled Becoming Montreal: The 1800s Painted by Duncan was held at the McCord Museum in Montreal from 2023 to 2024. It was accompanied by a Mental Map by Iregular.

== Selected public collections ==
Forty of his works are in the McCord Museum. His work is also in the collection of the National Gallery of Canada, the Royal Ontario Museum and Library and Archives Canada.

== Memberships ==
In 1837, Duncan was a lieutenant in the Montreal Light Infantry.

In 1847, Duncan was one of the founders, along with Krieghoff, and treasurer of the Montreal Society of Artists. In 1867, he was elected a member of the Society of Canadian Artists at Montreal and in 1880, an associate member of the Royal Canadian Academy.

== Record sale prices ==
In Cowley Abbott's Live Auction of Important Canadian & International Art, Nov. 27, 2024, Lot #25, Sleighing on the St. Lawrence (1846), watercolour and gouache over graphite on paper, 15.5 x 26 in ( 39.4 x 66 cm ) ( sight ) Auction Estimate: $8,000.00 - $12,000.00 realized a price of $22,800.00 and in the same auction, Lot #26 Bonsecours Market, St. Paul Street, about 1852, watercolour over graphite on paper, 15.5 x 24 in ( 39.4 x 61 cm ), Auction Estimate: $8,000.00 - $12,000.00, realized a price of $66,000.00.
