= Dougald Park =

American film, stage and television actor

Dougald Park is an American film, stage and television actor.

Park appeared in films such as Birddog (as Harv Beckman), Bruce Almighty, Shadow Box and Indio, USA. He also appeared in recurring and minor roles in TV series such as Scrubs, Desperate Housewives, Alias, Judging Amy, Numb3rs, The West Wing, Brothers & Sisters and Las Vegas. In 1980, he played Asher in the stage play Noon in Eugene, Oregon, and in 1981, he appeared in the stage play Step on a Crack.
