= Fred Anderson (journalist) =

American television news journalist

Fred Anderson (1936–1996) was an American television news reporter and journalist in Los Angeles, California.

Anderson was born in Worcester, Massachusetts, in 1936, and studied music before becoming interested in radio broadcasting. He worked at radio stations in Boston MA, Roanoke VA, and New Orleans LA. In 1960, he moved with his wife and two young daughters to Los Angeles with no prospects, and on his first day, walked into KABC Radio, and was hired on the spot. He later moved to KABC-TV, where he remained for 27 years to become the well-known voice of "Good News". He received an Emmy Award for a feature on battered children.

He died on 23 June 1996 in Los Angeles, of complications following heart surgery.
