= Dax Cowart =

American lawyer (1947–2019)

- Born: Donald Herbert Cowart; December 16, 1947; Henderson, Texas, U.S.
- Died: April 28, 2019 (aged 71); Fallbrook, California, U.S.
- Education: Texas Tech University
- Occupation: Attorney
- Known for: Advocacy for patient autonomy
- Notable work: Please Let Me Die and Dax's Case video documentaries

Donald Herbert Cowart (December 16, 1947 – April 28, 2019), better known as Dax Cowart, was an attorney and a former United States Air Force pilot who served in the Vietnam War. He was born in Henderson, Texas. In 1973, Cowart sustained debilitating injuries from a propane gas explosion that resulted in the loss of his hands and eyes. He suffered significant hearing loss, and was so severely burned over most of his body that the only place where his skin remained undamaged was on the bottom of his feet. Prior to the accident, he was known to his family and friends as Don or Donnie; however, after the accident he changed his first name to Dax because it was a rather uncommon name, easier for him to write, and it helped to avoid the embarrassment he felt after responding to someone he thought was addressing him, only to discover they were addressing someone else with the same name.

Cowart's pleas that he be allowed to die were not honored even though, that same year, the American Medical Association had endorsed a competent patient's right to discontinue prolonged life-saving treatments. He said the doctors thought that if they forced him to receive treatment, he would change his mind and want to live, and that it would be the best outcome for him in the long run. Cowart disagreed and continued to hold the belief that it is both morally wrong and a civil rights violation to force a person who is in full control of their faculties to receive treatment against their will.

Despite the debilitating effects of his injuries, Cowart graduated from Texas Tech University in 1986 with a law degree, and established his own legal practice as a personal injury attorney. He became notable for the ethical issues he raised over the medical community's efforts to save his life against his wishes. His case is often cited in discussions of medical ethics.

== Accident ==
On July 25, 1973, Cowart was a 25-year-old US Air Force Reserve pilot working with his father, a cattle rancher and real estate broker in Henderson, TX. The accident occurred as they returned to their car after inspecting a tract of land they were considering for purchase. A nearby underground pipeline was leaking propane gas – which unlike natural gas is heavier than air and thus collects in low areas such as the creek bed near which they had parked – and as they started the car the propane exploded.

The surrounding trees and vegetation caught fire as Cowart was showered with glass from the windshield. He made his way out of the car and ran, breaking through three walls of fire, rolling on the ground after each one to extinguish his burning clothes. After a mile and a half he collapsed. He later wrote:

I was burned so severely and in so much pain that I did not want to live even in the early moments following the explosion. A man who heard my shouts for help came running down the road, I asked him for a gun. He said, "Why?" I said, "Can't you see I am a dead man? I am going to die anyway. I need to put myself out of this misery." In a very kind and compassionate caring way, he said, "I can't do that."

Cowart's father, who had been outside the car at the time of the explosion, was found barely alive near the edge of the fire. Both men were taken to a hospital in Kilgore, and from there another 140 miles (230 km), in the same ambulance, to Parkland Hospital in Dallas; Cowart's father died en route.

Fearing he would be unable to regain his former level of activity, he refused treatment en route to the hospital. In the hospital, he has written, he was "forcibly treated for 14 months" despite asking to be allowed to die. He likened some of the treatments – such as bandage replacement and chlorinated baths – to feeling he was being "skinned alive". He was given limited painkillers because of a poor understanding of their risks, and was denied access to legal assistance by which he might have forced treatment to end.

Cowart's injuries required amputation of both his hands, leaving only a fragment of thumb by which he could grasp small items such as eating utensils and a cup handle. Both eyes were removed and damage to his ears left his hearing impaired. What little undamaged skin remained on his body was used for grafts to reshape his nostrils, lips, and eyelids. He attempted suicide several times.

== Later life and death ==
Cowart earned a law degree in 1986 from Texas Tech University. He opened his own law practice, and later worked with trial attorney Robert Hilliard, founder of Hilliard Munoz Gonzales LLC., Corpus Christi, Texas.

After the accident, Cowart changed his first name to Dax to avoid confusion after he embarrassingly discovered that, on more than one occasion, he had mistakenly responded to the name Donald when another person was being addressed. The shorter name was also easier for him to write. He married Samantha Berryessa, a California attorney, and they lived on a farm in San Diego County.

Cowart was a frequent teacher and speaker at the Trial Lawyers College in Dubois, Wyoming. The college was founded by Gerry Spence, and the courses provided are Continuing Legal Education (CLE) accredited by "the state in which the course is held."

Cowart spoke on patient rights in the US and abroad. His life and his reflections on what has happened to him challenged medicine's understanding of itself as a moral practice. A documentary of his plight titled Please Let Me Die was filmed in 1974, with a follow-up documentary titled Dax's Case filmed in 1984. Cowart's case illustrates several issues of patient autonomy.

Cowart died at the age of 71 on April 28, 2019, from complications of leukemia and liver cancer, in Fallbrook, California.
