= Fred Anderson (footballer, born 1886) =

Australian rules footballer

Personal information
- Full name: Frederick Arthur Anderson
- Born: 16 March 1886; Launceston, Tasmania
- Died: 21 April 1963 (aged 77); Wollongong, New South Wales
- Original team: Mt Lyell District

Playing career^{1}
Years	Club	Games (Goals)
1908	Essendon	1 (0)
- ^{1} Playing statistics correct to the end of 1908.

Frederick Arthur Anderson (16 March 1886 – 21 April 1963) was an Australian rules footballer who played a single game with Essendon in the Victorian Football League (VFL).
