= Lily Dougall =

Canadian author

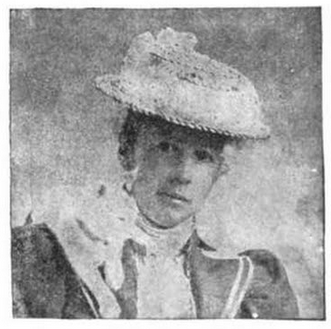
- Lily Dougall, from a 1900 publication.
- Born: 1858; Montreal, Canada East
- Died: 1923 (aged 64–65)
- Citizenship: Canadian
- Occupation: Writer

Lily Dougall (1858–1923) was a Canadian writer and feminist.

== Biography ==
Born into an evangelical Presbyterian newspaper family, Dougall's liberal views often conflicted with her religious upbringing. She was the youngest of the nine children of John Dougall. Although born in Montreal, Canada East, she was educated in New York City and at both the University of Edinburgh and St. Andrew's University in Scotland. While in Edinburgh, she lived with her aunt. She lived in Montreal from 1897 to 1903 until she finally settled down in Cumnor, near Oxford, in 1911. While there, she lived her life with her lesbian partner, Sophie Earp. In Cumnor, she became the center of a group that was dedicated to thought and conversation. This was similar in its views to that of her first essay, Pro Christo et Ecclesia (1900).

Her debut novel, Beggars All, was published in 1892 followed by nine other novels. Her contemporaries thought her novels were "well-received" and they have "been widely read far from the shores of her native land". She also did write a novel prior to Beggars All, Lovereen, A Canadian Novel, that was published under a male pseudonym. She also published one volume of short stories and eight books of religious philosophy. Four of Dougall's novels have Canadian settings spanning from western British Columbia to Eastern Quebec to Atlantic Prince Edward Island. What Necessity Knows, The Zeitgeist, The Mermaid: A Love Tale and The Madonna of a Day: A Study. Her fiction is characterized by twists of fate, disguise, hidden identity and disillusioned love. More noteworthy, however, her work is known for its exploration of religious and philosophical themes. Many of her protagonists are strong, independent females who are typically drawn to the idea of egalitarian marriage.

== Works ==
- What Necessity Knows (1893)
- The Zeit-Geist (1895)
- The Mermaid (1895)
- A Dozen Ways Of Love (1897)
- The Mormon Prophet (1899)
- The Summit House Mystery (1905)
