= Michael Coward =

English geologist

Michael Peter Coward (26 June 1945 – 16 July 2003) was an English geologist who did research on "thin-skinned" tectonics.

Coward studied geology at Imperial College London. He was H. H. Read Professor of Geology at Imperial College, Council Member of the Geological Society of London, and Chair of the UK Tectonic Studies Group. He received The Murchison Fund award in 1980.

In his honour the Geological Society published Deformation of the Continental Crust: The Legacy of Mike Coward in 2007.
