= Dougall Canal =

Coordinates: 44.6103572°N 79.3755819°W

The Dougall Canal is a canal in Simcoe County, Ontario, Canada. It was named in 2015 for Bruce Dougall, who undertook its construction during the 1960s. It is located in Orillia on Couchiching Point, a piece of land that separates Lake Couchiching from Lake Simcoe.

The development of Couchiching Point was originally going to be a denser subdivision according to plans filed in 1890. The land remained undeveloped until Dougall began development in the 1960s, but the plans changed during development to be lower density and added the canal. The new development was known as Crescent Cove, and the canal was unnamed. The canal route generally follows the path of what was originally set aside for Cumberland Avenue. By cutting the canal, 55 lots had lake access instead of the original 25.

The canal and small sections of land on either side of it were owned by the city, who had responsibility for keeping it operational. They failed to do so, and by the 2000s it was overgrown. The city agreed to give the land to the homeowners, many of whom had already build on the land. In exchange, the homeowners association took over maintenance of the canal.

The canal is 12 feet (3.7 m) deep in the center, but reduces to 6 feet (1.8 m) at either end where it connects to the Trent-Severn Canal system. It is about 0.5 miles (0.80 km) long, running roughly north–south across the peninsula.
