= Dena Coward =

Canadian sports event coordinator

- Occupation: Sports Event Coordinator

Dena Coward is a Canadian sports event coordinator. She was part of the preparation for multiple sporting events including the 2010 Winter Paralympics and the 2015 Pan Am Games. Coward was awarded the Paralympic Order in 2010.

== Early life and education ==
Coward lived in the Canadian Prairies before moving to Vancouver. She went to the University of Manitoba and graduated with a Bachelor of Physical Education.

== Career ==
In her career, Coward participated in the preparation and administration of multiple sporting events. She was an events volunteer at the 2000 Summer Olympics and assistant leader at the 2001 Canada Games. Coward was involved in the Vancouver bid and preparation for the 2010 Winter Olympics. In 2002, Coward managed the transportation plan that was presented to the International Olympic Committee for Vancouver's bid. In 2005, Coward became the Paralympics director for the planning of the 2010 Winter Olympics and the 2010 Winter Paralympics. As director, she collaborated with VANOC until 2010.

In 2012, Coward was selected to the planning committee of the 2015 Pan American Games. For the Pan Am Games, she was the vice president of service design and oversaw the various sections of the games. In 2015, Coward was chosen to be on the Paralympic Games committee for the International Paralympic Committee. Other planning events that Coward were involved in include the 2017 Invictus Games and Red Deer, Alberta's bid for the 2019 Canada Winter Games. Outside of planning, Coward played for a national handball team.

== Awards and honours ==
In 2010, Coward was given the Paralympic Order.
