= Dugald McQuistan =

Scottish mathematician

Prof Dugald Black McQuistan FRSE (1879 – 2 April 1946) was a Scottish mathematician.

== Life ==
He was born at Inverkip in Renfrewshire 1879. He was the son of Alexander McQuisten, a baker, and Agnes Leitch, the daughter of a grocer and market gardener. He was educated at Whitehill School in Glasgow. On 11 December 1895 it was announced in The Scotsman:

Dougald McQuistan and Peter Ramsay, two students of the secondary department of Whitehill Public School, Glasgow, have been awarded by the Science and Art Department "Queen's Prizes" to mathematics.

After studying Mathematics and Physics at Glasgow University he returned to Whitehill School to teach maths. From there he moved to teach at Allan Glen's School and then to the High School. He appears to have continued to live with his parents, then at 33 Renfield Street in Glasgow.

In 1921 he was elected a Fellow of the Royal Society of Edinburgh. His proposers were Andrew Gray, George Alexander Gibson, John Gordon Gray and Robert Alexander Houston.

In 1925 he became an associate professor of Natural Philosophy (Physics) at the Royal Technical College, Glasgow. He was given a full professorship in 1938 and retired in 1942.

He died on 2 April 1946. His sister Elizabeth Leitch McQuistan, a teacher, confirmed his death.
