= Dougal Jerram =

British geologist and presenter

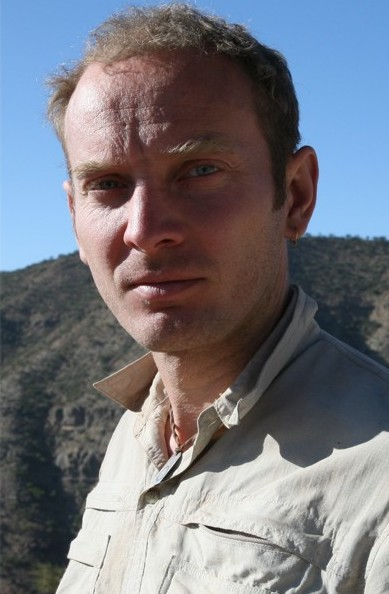
- Born: 12 December 1969 (age 56); London, England
- Education: Cardiff University, University of Liverpool
- Occupation: Geologist
- Known for: TV/media work

Dougal Alexander Jerram (born 12 December 1969) is a British geologist/earth scientist, and television and media presenter/contributor.

As an earth sciences expert, he has appeared on the BBC, National Geographic, Discovery Channel, History Channel and Channel 4, and on many other TV and radio programs, relating the earth sciences to the general public. He has published over 45 scientific papers, has edited for scientific journals, and has held posts on committees including the Volcanic and Magmatic Studies Group of the Geological Society. In 2006 he received the Murchison Fund by the Geological Society of London for his early career contribution to geology.

== Early life and career ==
Born in 1969, Dougal grew up in the London suburbs (with a brief stint in Manchester). His love for geology and the Earth was first realised whilst studying at London's Northwood School. Studying geology, he graduated from Cardiff University in 1992. He obtained his doctorate in 1996 at the University of Liverpool based on his research into ways that textures in volcanic and igneous rocks were formed and could be studied.

He began his professional career in 1996 with a two-year postdoctoral position at the University of Würzburg, Germany. In 1998, he returned to the UK and spent 13 years as research fellow, lecturer and senior lecturer at the University of Durham. In June 2011 he set up DougalEARTH Ltd., where he combines his pursuits in consultancy, media, research and teaching.

== Television and media career ==
Dougal's first major TV appearance was on a popular science expedition to Ethiopia called 'The Hottest Place on Earth' for the BBC and discovery in 2009, having appeared early that year on Britain From Above with Andrew Marr. He has subsequently appeared on a number of science-related films, usually at or very near live volcanoes. In 2010 he reported extensively on the air travel disruption after the 2010 Eyjafjallajökull eruption in live TV interviews on BBC, Sky News, ITV and various radio programs, and in features for Channel 4 News, BBC and The Guardian. He has also made live TV appearances as Dr Volcano for The One Show on BBC.

TV and media contributions

- Britain from Above (shown August 2008), Geology expert in Episode 3 of Andrew Marr's BBC1 series. Produced by LION TV (Director – Cassian Harrison)., also shown in the United States on the Discovery Channel
- Hottest Place on Earth (March 2009), 2x 1 hour BBC1, 3 × 1 hour BBC Worldwide, 1x 1hour Discovery Channel. Co-host on Popular science expedition to see the volcanoes and people of the Afar Region in Ethiopia alongside Kate Humble and Steve Leonard. Produced by Lion TV (Producer/Director – Rupert Smith, Katie Crawford, Justin Kelly and Max Shapira)

"In The Hottest Place on Earth, a team of scientists and adventurers descended on a low-lying part of Ethiopia to analyse volcanic activity, the landscape and the way of life of the tribe. Dougal Jerram, the geologist, was fantastic, explaining how the rocky landscape was tilted along cracks in the Earth's crust." – The Times, 20 March 2009.

- How the Earth Was Made – Vesuvius (November 2009), 1 × 1 hour History Channel. On screen Earth Sciences Presenter on sections for Pompeii and Herculanuem. Produced by Pioneer Productions (Director – Belinda Kirk)
- Iceland Volcano: The Next Eruption (Aired 16 May 2010) (Discovery/BBC worldwide) Volcano on-screen expert on one off quick turn around about Iceland Volcanic Crisis. Produced by Atlantic Productions (Producer/director – Oliver Page).
- Clash of the Continents (July – on, 2010), 2 x 1hour National Geographic channel – worldwide. On screen Earth Sciences Presenter including Vesuvius, Stromboli, Super-volcanoes and plate tectonics. Produced by Natural History New Zealand (Director – Mike Ibeji).
- Birth of Britain (September – on, 2010) On screen Earth Sciences expert alongside Tony Robinson for National Geographic & Channel 4. Volcanic Britain as part of the Birth of Britain series Produced by Pioneer Productions.

== Books ==
As well as contributing a significant volume of scientific literature (see publications list), Dougal has written two earth science books:

- The Field Description of Igneous Rocks, 2nd Edition by Dougal Jerram & Nick Petford, published by Wiley, 2011 ISBN 978-0-470-02236-8
- Introducing Volcanology: A Guide to Hot Rocks, by Dougal Jerram, published by Dunedin Academic Press, 2011 ISBN 978-1-906716-22-6

== Selection of publications ==
- Catherine E. Nelson, Dougal A. Jerram, Richard W. Hobbs, Ricky Terrington and Holger Kessler. Reconstructing flood basalt lava flows in three dimensions using terrestrial laser scanning. Geosphere, February 2011; 7: 87 – 96.
- J. Hansen, D. A. Jerram, K. Mccaffrey, S.R. Passey 2011. Early Cenozoic saucer-shaped sills of the Faroe Islands: an example of intrusive styles in basaltic lava piles. Journal of the Geological Society 2011 volume 168: 159–178.
- Dougal A. Jerram, Graham R. Davis, Alex Mock, Amanda Charrier and Bruce D. Marsh 2010. Quantifying 3D crystal populations, packing and layering in shallow intrusions: a case study from the Basement Sill, Dry Valleys, Antarctica. Geosphere Volume: 6 Issue: 5 Pages: 537–548.
- Bryan S.E., Peate I.U., Peate D.W., Jerram D.A., Mawby M.R., Marsh J.S., Miller J.A. 2010. The largest volcanic eruptions on Earth. Earth-Science Reviews, Volume: 102, Issue: 3–4, Pages: 207–229.
- Victoria M. Martin1, Jon Davidson, Dan Morgan, Dougal A. Jerram 2010. Using the Sr isotope compositions of feldspars and glass to distinguish magma system components and dynamics. Geology Volume: 38 Issue: 6 Pages: 539–542
- Dougal A. Jerram, Alex Mock, Graham R. Davis, Matthew Field, Richard J. Brown 2009. 3D crystal size distributions: A case study on quantifying olivine populations in kimberlites. Lithos 112S, 223–235.
- Dougal A. Jerram, Richard T. Single, Richard W. Hobbs & Catherine E. Nelson 2009. Understanding the offshore flood basalt sequence using onshore volcanic facies analogues: an example from the Faroe–Shetland basin Geol. Mag. 146 (3), pp. 353–367. doi:10.1017/S0016756809005974
- Dougal A. Jerram, Kathryn M. Goodenough & Valentin R. Troll 2009. Introduction: from the British Tertiary into the future – modern perspectives on the British Palaeogene and North Atlantic Igneous provinces. Geol. Mag. 146 (3), pp. 305–308. doi:10.1017/S001675680900627X
- Nelson, C.E., Jerram, D.A. and Hobbs, R.W., 2009, Flood basalt facies from borehole data: implications for prospectivity and volcanology in volcanic rifted margins: Petroleum Geoscience, v. 15, p. 313–324.
- Victoria M. Martin, Daniel J. Morgan, Dougal A. Jerram, Mark J. Caddick, David J. Prior, Jon P. Davidson. 2008 Bang! Month-Scale Eruption Triggering at Santorini Volcano. Science 2008 VOL 321 page 1178.
- Dougal A. Jerram, & Victoria Martin 2008 Understanding crystal populations and their significance through the magma plumbing system. In: Annen, C. & Zellmer, G. F. (eds) Dynamics of Crustal Magma Transfer, Storage and Differentiation. Geological Society, London, Special Publications, 304, 133–148.
- Dougal A. Jerram, & Jon Davidson. 2007. Frontiers in textural and microgeochemical analysis. Elements 3: 235–238.
- Dougal A. Jerram, & Micheal Higgins. 2007. 3D Analysis of Rock Textures: Quantifying Igneous Microstructures. Elements 3: 239–245.
- Morgan, D.J., Jerram, D.A., Chertkoff, D.G., Davidson, J.P., Pearson, D.G., Kronz, A. & Nowell, G.M. 2007. Combining CSD and isotopic microanalysis: Magma supply and mixing processes at Stromboli Volcano, Aeolian Islands, Italy. Earth & Planetary Science Letters 260(3–4): 419–431
- Dougal A Jerram, Adam Kent (2006) An Overview of Modern Trends in Petrography: Textural and Microanalysis of Igneous Rocks. Journal of Volcanology and Geothermal Research 154, Issues 1–2, Pages vii–ix.
- Dan Morgan & Dougal A. Jerram (2006) On estimating crystal shape for crystal size distribution analysis. Journal of Volcanology and Geothermal Research, 154, Issues 1–2, Pages 1–7.
- Dougal A. Jerram, & Mike Widdowson (2005) The anatomy of Continental Flood Basalt Provinces: Geological constraints on the processes and products of flood volcanism. Lithos 79, 385–405. (IF 2.561).
- Alex Mock & Dougal A Jerram, (2005) Crystal size distributions in three dimensions: insights from the 3D reconstruction of a highly porphyritic rock texture Journal of Petrology 46: 1525–1541. (IF 3.283).
- Richard T. Single & Dougal A. Jerram, (2004) The 3-D facies architecture of flood basalt provinces and their internal heterogeneity: examples from the Palaeogene Skye Lava Field. Journal of the Geological Society 161, 911–926. (IF 2.183).
- Dougal A. Jerram, Michael, J. Cheadle & Anthony R. Philpotts (2003). Quantifying the building blocks of igneous rocks: Are clustered crystal frameworks the foundation? Journal of Petrology Vol 44(11), 2033–2051 (IF 3.283).
- Dougal A. Jerram & Harald Stollhofen. (2002) Lava/sediment interaction in desert settings; are all peperite-like textures the result of magma-water interaction? Journal of Volcanology and Geothermal Research, 114, 231–249. (IF 1.003).
- Dougal A. Jerram (2002) Volcanology and facies architecture of flood basalts, in Menzies, M.A., Klemperer, S.L., Ebinger, C.J. and Baker, J., eds., Volcanic Rifted Margins: Geological Society of America Special Paper 362, p. 119–132.
- Dougal A. Jerram Visual comparators for degree of sorting in 2-D and 3-D. (2001) Computers and Geoscience 27, 485–492.
- Dougal A. Jerram & Olivier Robbe (2001). Building a 3-D geologic model of a Flood Basalt: an example from the Etendeka, NW Namibia. Electronic Geoscience 6:1.
- Dougal A. Jerram & Michael J Cheadle (2000) On the cluster analysis of rocks American Mineralogist, 85, 47–67.
- Dougal A. Jerram, Nigel Mountney, John Howell, Harald Stollhofen & Danny Long. (2000) Death of a sand sea: An active Aeolian erg systematically buried by the Etendeka Flood Basalts of NW Namibia Journal of the Geological Society, 157, 513–516.
- Dougal A. Jerram, Nigel Mountney & Harald Stollhofen (1999) Facies architecture of the Etjo Sandstone Formation and its interaction with the basal Etendeka flood basalts of NW Namibia: Implications for offshore analogues. In, Cameron, N., Bate, R. and Clure, V. (eds.), Oil and gas habitats of the South Atlantic. Geological Society of London Special Publication 153, 367–380.
- Dougal A. Jerram, Nigel Mountney, Frank Holzförster & Harald Stollhofen (1999) Stratigraphic relation in the Etendeka Group in the Huab Basin, NW Namibia: Understanding the onset of flood volcanism. Journal of Geodynamics 28, 393–418.
- Dougal A. Jerram, Michael J. Cheadle, Robert H. Hunter & Michael T. Elliott (1996) The spatial distribution of grains and crystals in rocks. Cont. Mineral. & Petrol. 125:60–74.
