= Frederick William Anderson (geologist) =

British geologist and palaeontologist

Frederick William Anderson FRSE FIB FSA (1905–1982) was a British geologist and palaeontologist. In the field of Ostracods he gives his name to the Anderson Cycles.

== Life ==
He was born on 13 January 1905 in Leeds in England, the son of William Stewart Anderson and his wife, Alice Ann Hodgson. He was educated at the City of Leeds School. He studied Science at the University of Leeds graduating BSc in 1925. He continued studies, receiving an MSc in 1929. In 1928 he began lecturing in Geology at the University of Southampton. In 1935 he took up the role of Palaeontologist for HM Geological Survey.

As a member of the Territorial Army, Anderson was instantly brought into service at the outbreak of the Second World War and joined the Royal Hampshire Regiment. He was transferred in 1941 to the Zuckerman Research Team looking at the effects of aerial bomb explosions. Termed a “military geologist” he worked alongside Frederick William Shotton and John Victor Stephens. In 1943 he joined the RAF as a Lieutenant Colonel and saw action across Europe. He was elected a Fellow of the Royal Society of Edinburgh in 1947. His proposers were Talbot Whitehead, Murray Macgregor, Arthur Holmes, David Haldane and James Ernest Richey.

He returned to the British Geological Survey after the war, working with people such as James Ernest Richey and Victor Eyles. In 1953 he was promoted to Chief Palaeontologist and continued in this role until retiral in 1965.

He was married to Katharine Anderson. He died on 2 May 1982.

== Publications ==
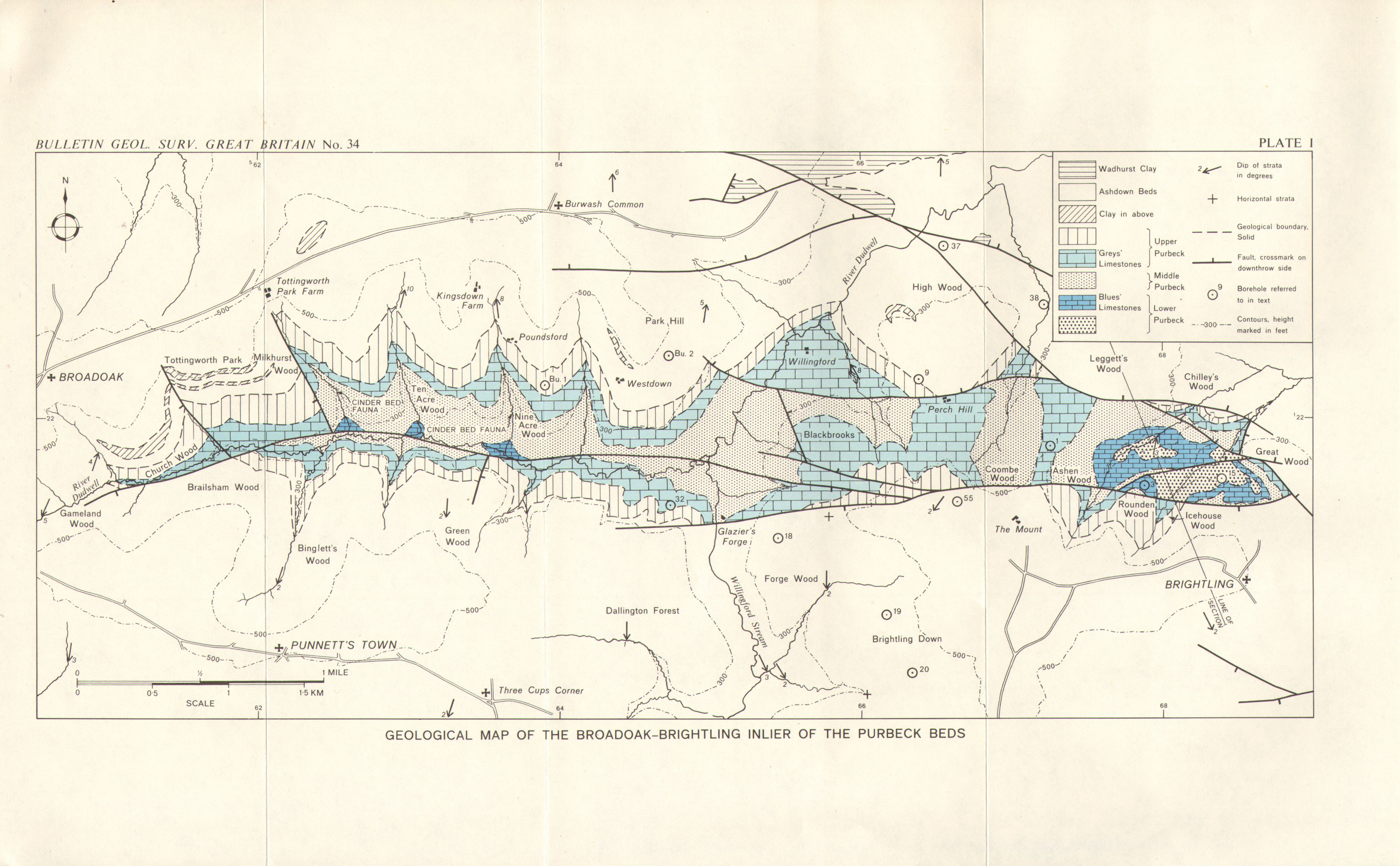
Geological map of the Broadoak-Brightling inlier of the Purbeck Beds. From Anderson & Bazley (1971)

- Anderson, Frederick William; Dunham, Kingsley Charles (1966). The Geology of Northern Skye: Explanation of the Portree (80) and Parts of the Rubha Hunish (90), Applecross (81) and Gairloch (91) Sheets (2 ed.). H.M. Stationery Office. ISBN 978-0-11-887412-0. OCLC 1052813047.
- —— (1985). "Ostracod faunas in the Purbeck and Wealden of England" (PDF). Journal of Micropalaeontology. 4 (2): 1–67. Bibcode:1985JMicP...4....1A. doi:10.1144/jm.4.2.1. S2CID 129871398.
- ——; Bazley, R.A.B. (1971). The Purbeck Beds of the Weald (England). H.M. Stationery Office.
