= Herbert Bolton (palaeontologist) =

British palaeontologist (1863–1936)

Herbert Bolton FRSE FGS (1863 – 18 January 1936) was a British palaeontologist and director of the Bristol Museum and Art Gallery for nearly 20 years. He was known as an authority on fossil insects.

He was born in Bacup, Lancashire, England and attended classes at night school whilst working in a mill. He afterwards studied at the Royal College of Science, London and Owens College, Manchester, where he was awarded an M.Sc. Trained in geology and paleontology, he worked as assistant keeper (1890–1898) and curator (1898–1911) at Manchester Museum before becoming Director of the Bristol Museum and Art Gallery (1911–1930).

He published several books, including the two volume Monograph of the Fossil insects of the British Coal Measures (1922). He was awarded the Murchison Fund for 1922 by the Geological Society.

He died in retirement in Reading, Berkshire. His daughter Edith (born 1893) became a botanist.
