= Talbot Whitehead =

British geologist

Talbot Haes Whitehead FRSE FGS (1890–1966) was a 20th-century British geologist.

== Life ==
He was born in London on 24 May 1890. He studied Sciences at University College, London, graduating BSc in 1912. In 1913, aged only 23, he was elected a Fellow of the Geological Society. He was appointed as a Geologist to the British Geological Survey in 1914, but this was disrupted by the war.

In the First World War he served with the Royal Fusiliers and Suffolk Regiment, and saw action at Gallipoli and on the Somme. He reached the rank of Captain and was severely wounded in action and spent the final year working with the Intelligence section of the War Office.

Returning to the BGS he was promoted to District Geologist in 1935 and was responsible in particular for ensuring British coal and iron ore supplies during the Second World War. He was promoted to Assistant Director in 1945 in succession to Murray Macgregor. He was awarded the Murchison Fund by the Geological Society in 1933.

He was elected a Fellow of the Royal Society of Edinburgh in 1946 for his contributions to geology. His proposers were W. F. P. McLintock, Sir Edward Battersby Bailey, Murray Macgregor, James Ernest Richey, Sir A. E. Trueman and Arthur Holmes.

He retired in 1952 and died on 5 April 1966.

== Publications ==
- The Geology of the Southern Part of the South Staffordshitre Coalfield
- The Welsh Borderland
- Geology of the Country between Dudley and Bridgnorth
- Geology of the Country around Birmingham

== Family ==
In 1920 he married Nora Margaret Wilson.
