= Nancy Kirk (geologist) =

British geologist

Nancy Kirk (1916–2005) was a British geologist who developed original theories regarding the life and habits of graptolites. She was a protégée of Owen Thomas (O.T.) Jones, a Welsh geology professor with an undergraduate in Natural Sciences.

During her time at Newnham College, Cambridge, she originally intended to study Botany, but soon switched to Geology where she receive "first class marks" in her final exams in 1939. She was awarded her PhD in geology in 1949 for her work along the Church Stretton fault zone and the area west of the Knighton Sheet afterwards she worked at Birmingham University. In 1953 she was appointed assistant lecturer in the Geology Department at Aberystwyth University, and became a full lecturer a couple years later in 1955. Even after her retirement in 1983, Kirk continued in the department.

== Early life ==
Nancy Kirk originally lived in Mansfield, Nottinghamshire. She resided there from her birth on 15 June 1916 until 1935 (around 19 years later) when she left her hometown to attend Newnham College in Cambridge. Nancy and her older brother were raised mainly by their father, as their mother had died when Nancy was very young.

During this time, her father was employed at a local factory where he worked as an office boy, eventually taking on a management role. Consequently, Kirk was used to living a more conserved lifestyle growing up. For example, while she was attending school, she was known to bicycle home after the term was finished - as she was unable to afford to take the train at the time. Despite her financial difficulties when she was younger, Nancy made use of her time and money putting it into the things she had a passion for. Her interests included art, gardening, and the admiration and collection of artifacts; the latter being a passion for which she saved most of her money, putting it towards any pieces that had greatly intrigued her.

== Education ==
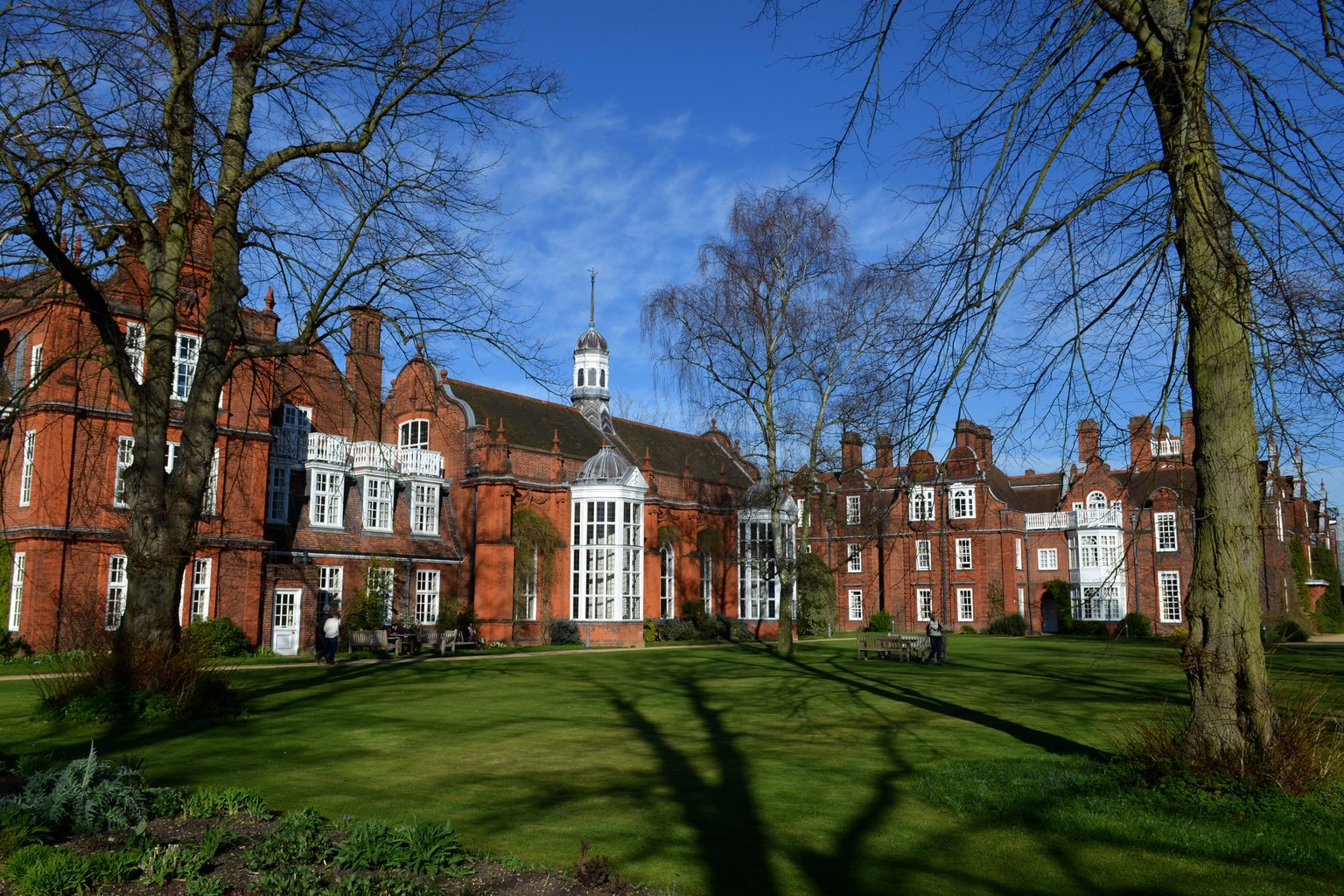
Image of Newnham College in Cambridge where Kirk pursued geology.

Kirk attended Mansfield's Queen Elizabeth's Girls' Grammar School where she won a competition in 1985, which granted her an opportunity to study in the faculty of natural sciences in Newnham College, Cambridge. Though she had originally planned to continue studying botany, Nancy developed a newfound interest in geology after finding great inspiration from the professors in the geology department: Brian Harland, Teddy Bullard, and Professor O. T. Jones.

In the year 1939, a time when women could not hold degrees, she was awarded the Bathurst Prize based on the exceptional grades she received during her studies in geology. She then received the Harkness Scholarship as well as the Bathurst Research Studentship which gave her an opportunity to begin research (under professor O. T. Jones) in what is now known as Powys, Wales. Kirk left Cambridge in the wake of World War II when she was sent to work at the Royal Ordnance Factory in 1942. Shortly after the war, in 1945 Nancy was able to return to Cambridge. She remained at Cambridge for the rest of her studies and received her PhD later in 1949, this was when females could finally receive degrees. After receiving her doctorate, Kirk went to work in Birmingham at the university for two years before moving to live in her area of research, a country between Pontfaen, Breconshire, and Presteigne, Radnorshire.

== Research ==
In 1942, her research was put aside due to World War II. She returned to Cambridge in 1945 on a two-year Jenner Research Fellowship. Nancy's research took a vast majority of her time, especially her work on graptolites in the 1970s. Graptolites are marine invertebrate species that are believed to be around during the palaeozoic period. Nancy Kirk was able to carry out her research via the study of graptolite fossils.

After receiving her PhD in 1949, she continued her geological mapping. Nancy became an assistant lecturer in 1953 then eventually a full lecturer in 1955 in the geology faculty at Aberystwyth University. Nancy was known to care a lot for her students to succeed and put a lot of effort into her teaching. She presented her ideas about the evolutions of the graptolites in the late 1960s and carried out her research until her official retirement in 1983. Nancy began a major study on graptolites with the help from Dr. Denis Bates although their work remains to be published.

Her research in the 1980s when she was working with the University College of Wales, in Aberystwyth began to focus on graptolites.

== Field work ==
In the 1950s, Kirk had done a lot of fieldwork. Though her earlier work was not officially published, she had established a series of maps and conducted research around the Welsh borders. The work was later used to help build the foundation of further studies in the area.

After completing her fieldwork studies at the time, Nancy presented her findings at three meetings of the Geological Society of London. On one occasion, however, Nancy Kirk and Pam Robinson had been unable to attend a gathering after, as the dining club that the rest of the members had gone to had been exclusive to only men.

Reports on the fieldwork she did can be found in a part of her PhD thesis, which is stored in the university library of Cambridge. In 1954 she was awarded the Murchison Fund for the work she accomplished.

The map that she originally submitted to get published had actually been more descriptive and covered an area greater than her official PhD did – features which caused her to receive backlash from editors and referees who felt that the map was much too large and had too much detail. Defending her paper, Kirk explained how and why the information she had was important: because it was critical for comprehending the map. Eventually, she was able to convince them, but she had to shorten her written work in the end because the Geological Society due to rationing that was occurring at the time.

As a result, she created three draft texts. These draft texts still exist today and so do her field slips, however the original map cannot be found.

== Graptolites ==
Graptolites are colony creatures that belong to the subclass Graptolithina of the Pterobranchia class. Fossils dating from the Middle Cambrian to the Lower Carboniferous are the main source of information about these filter-feeding creatures.

It wasn't until the late 1960s that Kirk took an interest in graptolites. She originally used graptolites for processes of identification and correlation in her research after her professor O.T.’s lead. This was because of the graptolites burst in population beginning in about the mid-Cambrian fossil records. Consequently, these marine fossils were a useful index fossil within the field; however, they suddenly nearly vanished from record about 200 million years later. Her findings were far more Jurassic than she had originally envisioned, graptolites then became her main focus of study by this fluke mistake. Reviewing her paleontology work from previous years before teaching, she gained an interest in graptolites and their sexual dimorphism.

Kirk then worked on the studying the graptolite with Dennis Bates. Her success was largely due to the use of a scanning electron microscope (SEM) to examine specimens, and her collaboration with other previous works. She used this research and SEM photos to publish a paper about her extrapolations regarding the nature of the "soft parts" of these organisms, as there have only been carbonized fossils of skeletal remains ("hard parts") found. She was also, in unison, exploring how graptolites lived. There is some debate on both of these subjects and the evidence we have is limited, we do not have early life fossils of the young graptolites. Kirk and Bates suggested this may be because graptolites were born as small larva that would be too soft to fossilize, then later in life once they attached themselves to the ocean floor, they would harden or solidify and this could potentially be the fossils we have found today.

Kirk's work on graptolites was considered controversial, before she came in.

== Awards ==
While at Newnham College, Cambridge, she received the Bathurst Prize, a Harkness Scholarship, and a Bathurst Research Studentship. In 1954, Kirk won The Murchison Fund of The Geological Society of the UK.

== Personal life and legacy ==
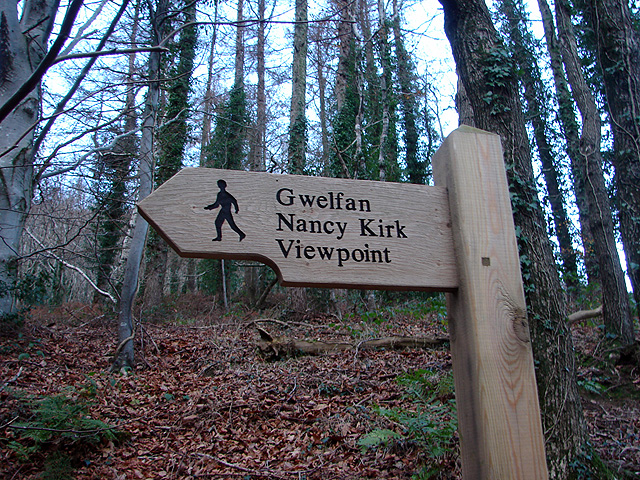
Nancy Kirk Viewpoint, Pant Da Nature Reserve

Kirk is fondly remembered by her students for her generosity, and colorful language. She actively put time into caring for her students and properly teaching the curriculum. Kirk put effort into the brightest and weakest students equally, making sure all of them moved forward and were able to learn what she was teaching. In contrast, back when she was working in the Royal Ordinance Factory (1942-1945), she boisterously challenged authority with her own ideas on how to run the factory more efficiently. This landed her a ban from "any further checking of machinery".

Kirk was someone who preferred to live in isolation, and be able to spend time in her gardens as she had a taste for naturism. In her three-acre site close to Llanatan in the Ystwyth Valley, Kirk had her rose gardens, but replaced them with other flowers such as azaleas and rhododendrons. She started off growing her gardens from cuttings, but soon was able to grow new varieties in her garden from seeds. She also had an interest in art, which lead her to start pottery and become quite talented at it, especially when it came to making the glazes. Bill Flitches, a colleague from her department, who provided her with the pots to use. Kirk soon started to grow miniature gardens at her bungalow, located near Aberystwyth where she moved soon later. Nancy Kirk, dedicated to her work and her garden, lived independently and never ended up marrying.

It was reported on her death that she was a committed Marxist, however, Kirk wasn't bothered with any of the modern political figures, nor fond of the modern consumerism trends. The Red Flag was played at her service.

After her death, the Nancy Kirk Viewpoint was created through donations by former students and colleagues, situated at the northernmost point of Pant Da nature reserve.
