= Dougal Graham =

- Born: c. 1724; Raploch, Stirling
- Died: 1779
- Known for: The "Skellat" Bellman of Glasgow

Dougal Graham, born in the Raploch, Stirlingshire, Scotland, around 1725 and died in 1779, became the skellat bellman of Glasgow at some time around 1770. In addition he was a prolific author of Scottish chapbooks and provides the best prose examples of mid 18th century vernacular Scots. In his youth he followed the Jacobite and Hanoverian forces around Britain as a non-combatant. His The History of the Rebellion in Britain in the Years, 1745 & 1746 gave an account in doggerel of his experiences and sold very well.

William George Black's article in the Dictionary of National Biography, 1900, proffers a little more detail on this figure's life and works−

..., chapbook writer and bellman, was born, it is believed, at Raploch, near Stirling, in 1724. He was much deformed, and found the wandering life of a 'chapman' (or pedlar) more to his taste than any settled trade; but when the highland army of Prince Charles Edward was on its way south in September 1745, he gave up such occupation as he had, and followed the prince. It is probable he was merely a camp-follower, as he can scarcely have been a soldier, but he accompunied the forces to Derby, and back to Scotland, and was present at Culloden (16 April 1746). Five months later he published A full, particular, and true Account of the Rebellion in the year 1745–46.

Composed by the Poet, D. Graham,
In Stirlingshire he lives at hame.

To the tune of "The Gallant Grahams," etc. This work is written throughout in a rough doggerel, but is historically useful as the undoubted testimony of an eye-witness. Its popularity was very great. No copies of the first or second (1752) editions are known to exist. Graham settled in Glasgow, and is said to have become a printer, but this is doubtful; at all events he became 'skellat,' bellman or town-crier, of Glasgow about 1770. He is described as "a bit wee gash bodie under five feet," as being lame in one leg, "with a large hunch on his back, and another protuberance on his breast." He died on 20 July 1779. Graham wrote, under assumed names, a large number of chapbooks, such as Jockey and Maggy's Courtship, The History of Buckhaven, Comical Transactions of Lothian Tom, History of John Cheap, the Chapman, Leper the Taylor, The History of Haverel Wives, Simple John and his Twelve Misfortunes, etc. All his works were exceedingly popular, and early editions have become very rare. Although coarse, they are not wanting in humour, and they are valuable to the student of folklore as containing very numerous references to current superstitions. Sir Walter Scott warmly appreciated Graham's talent, and so late as 1830 entertained the idea of printing a correct copy of the original edition of the rhyming history of the rebellion as his contribution to the Maitland Club publications. The idea was not carried out. Graham's collected writings were edited with notes, together with a biographical and bibliographical introduction, and a sketch of the chap literature of Scotland, by George MacGregor, 2 vols. 1883 (250 copies only).
