= Dugald Mackichan =

Scottish minister & missionary (1851-1932)

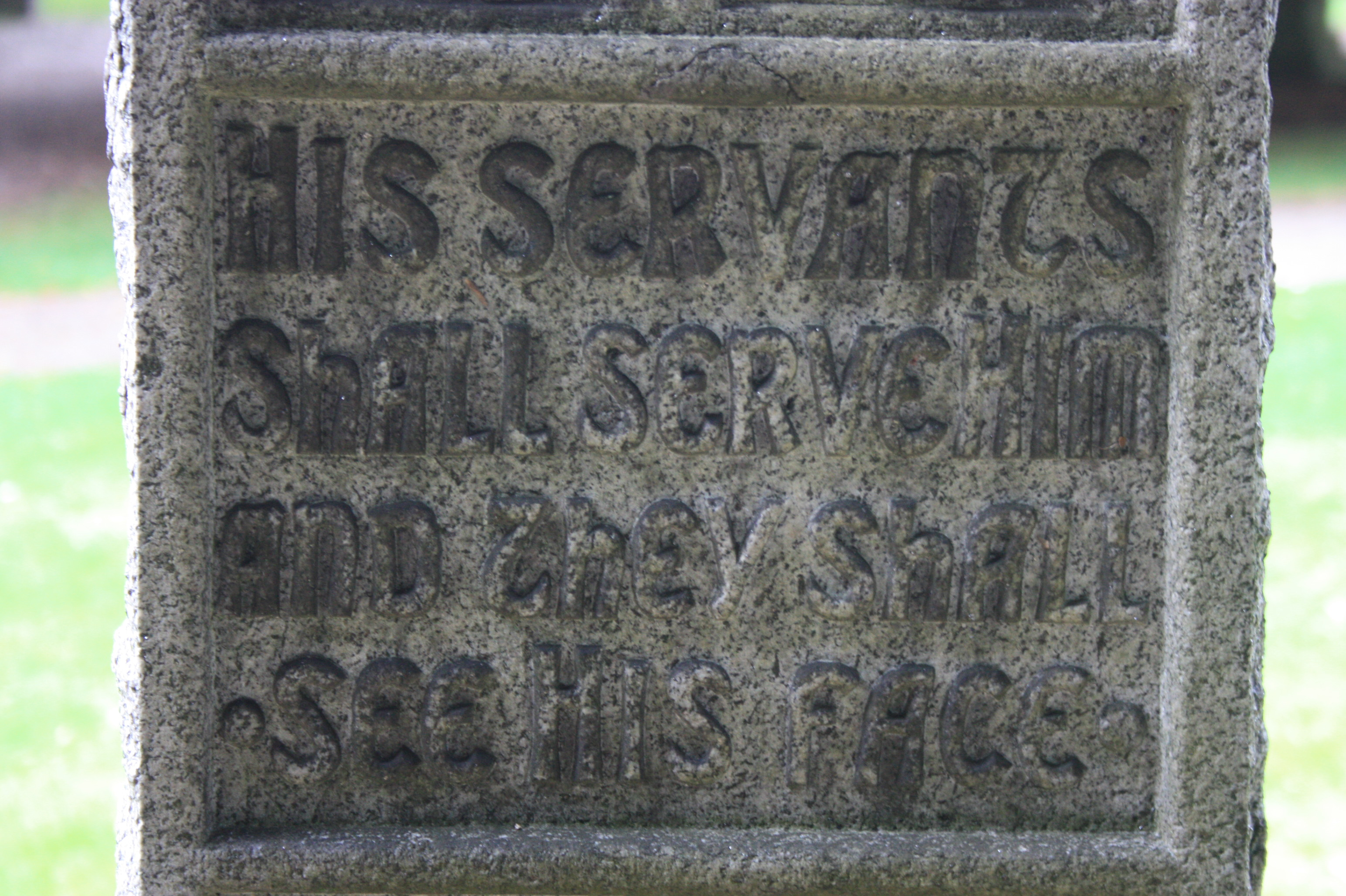
The inscription on Dugald Mackichan's grave, Dean Cemetery

Dugald Mackichan FRSE (1851–1932) was a Scottish minister and missionary in India. He was also a physicist. He was Vice Chancellor of the University of Bombay 1888 to 1891 and Mackichan Hall there is named in his honour. He served as Moderator of the General Assembly of the United Free Church of Scotland in 1917.

== Life ==
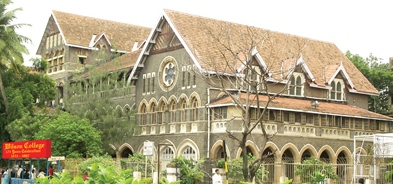
The Wilson College, Mumbai (Bombay)

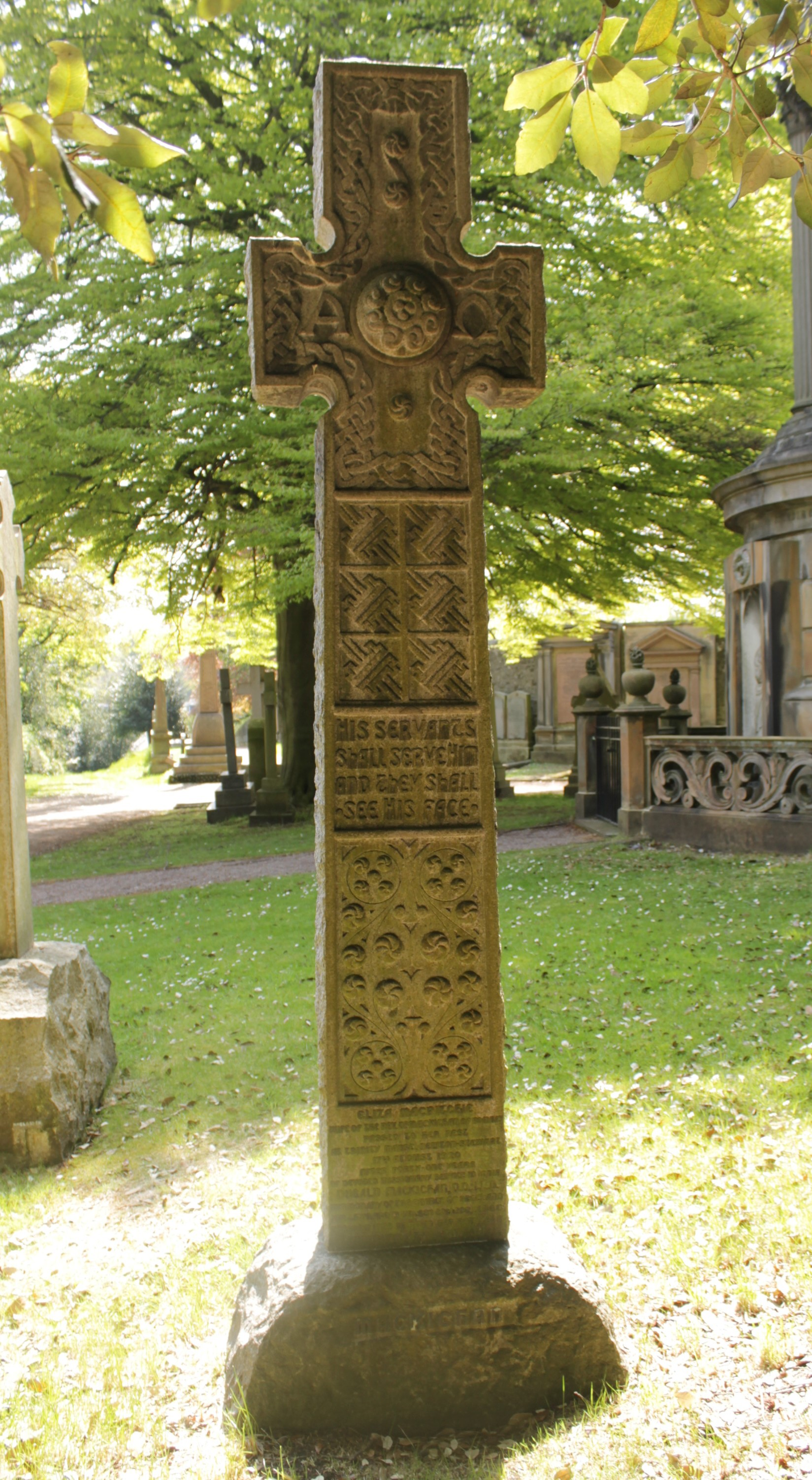
The grave of Rev Dugald Mackichan, Dean Cemetery

He was born in Glasgow in 1851 the son of Alexander Mackichan, a tobacco and snuff merchant, living at 277 Argyle Street. He attended Glasgow High School.

In initially studying science, he graduated MA in 1869 from Glasgow University. He then studied divinity and graduated BD in 1874.

In 1874 he went to India and joined the University of Bombay to lecture in physics and religious studies. He was principal of Wilson College 1884–1920. He served as Vice Chancellor of the university for three years during his tenure. In 1898 he attended the total solar eclipse of January 22 as part of K D Naegamvala’s observing expedition.

He was proficient in both Sanskrit and Marathi. He received two honorary doctorates: DD in 1884 and LLD in 1901.

He returned to Scotland and became a minister of the United Free Church of Scotland, being elected its Moderator in 1917 and being succeeded in 1918 by Rev Robert James Drummond of the Lothian Road UF Church.

In 1926 he was elected a fellow of the Royal Society of Edinburgh. His proposers were Sir James Alfred Ewing, Sir Edmund Taylor Whittaker, Sir D'Arcy Wentworth Thompson and Charles Glover Barkla. He died on 7 April 1932.

He is buried with his wife in Dean Cemetery in western Edinburgh. The grave lies under the trees in the south-west inner section.

== Publications ==
- The Missionary Ideal in the Scottish Churches (1927)
- Forty-five Years in India (1934)

== Family ==
In 1877 he was married to the missionary, Eliza MacRitchie (died 1920) daughter of Rev Malcolm Ritchie.

His daughter married a Rev Dr Williamson, an American missionary in India.
