= Dugald Stewart Walker =

American illustrator (1883-1937)

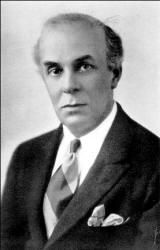
- Dugald Stewart Walker
- Born: 1883; Richmond, Virginia, U.S.
- Died: 1937 (aged 53–54); Richmond, Virginia, U.S.
- Resting place: Hollywood Cemetery
- Education: University of Virginia, New York School of Art
- Known for: Illustrator

Dugald Stewart Walker (1883 – 1937) was an early twentieth century American illustrator.

== Early life ==
Dugald Stewart Walker was a native of Richmond, Virginia, to Norvell Walker. He worked as an insurance agent at an early age. He studied drawing at the University of Virginia and the New York School of Art.

== Work ==
=== Illustration ===
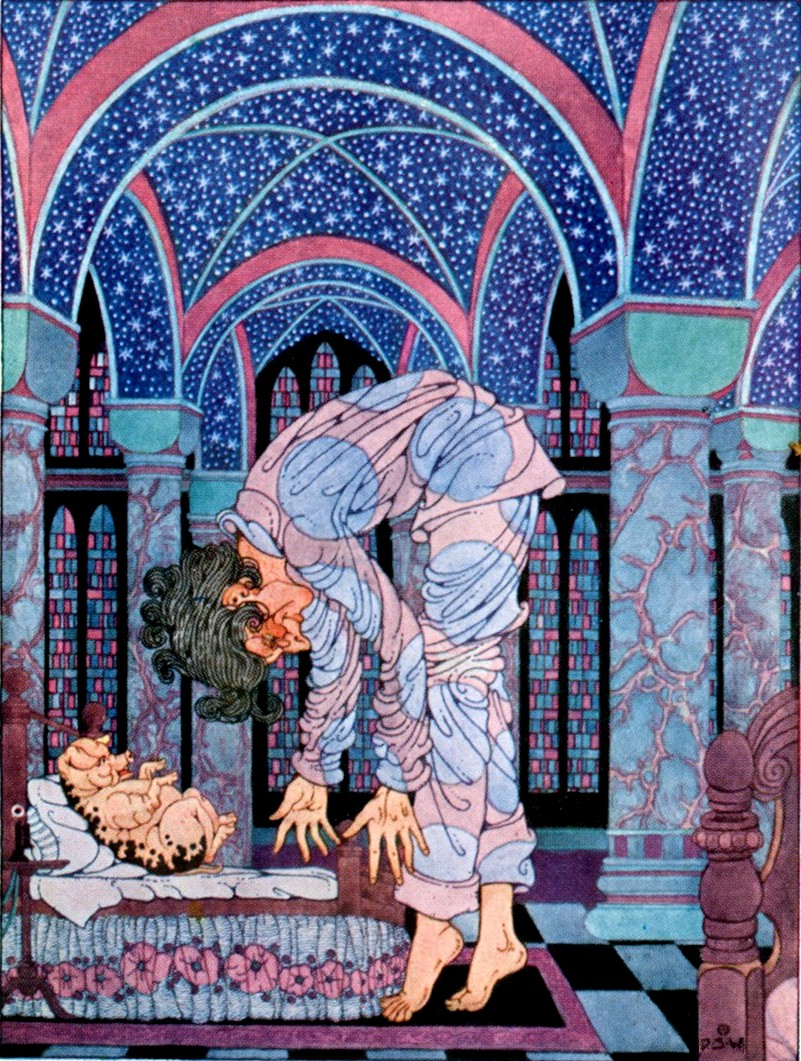
"I did not call you over to give me a bath," cried Squeaky Snythergen (1923)

Walker's first comprehensive suite of colour and monotone illustrations appeared in Stories for Pictures (1912) and in the Foreword for that title written by Mackay, Walker was described in the following terms:

"Dugald Stewart Walker, a new artist of remarkable talent, suggesting Rackham and Dulac but entirely original in spirit and execution."

Two years after that debut, his generously illustrated version of Fairy Tales from Hans Christian Andersen (1914) appeared - a title that benefited significantly from Walker's editorial involvement in the project - and over the following decade, many other commissions followed. Walker's Foreword to Fairy Tales from Hans Christian Andersen (1914) provides some insight into his approach, inspiration and intentions through his work:

"I have never been anywhere except Richmond, Virginia, and New York, because I have always been told that only grown-up people were allowed to travel. But the good East Wind and the kindly Moon have taken me on rapturous journeys high above the world to get an enchanted view of things. In this book I have put some of my discoveries, but if you are looking here for real likeness of the things that any one could see if he were grown up, you had better close the covers now. You cannot expect me to draw an exact picture of the North Pole or of a Chinese lady's feet or of a sea-cucumber. But if you are interested in what the East Wind or the Father Stork or the Moon told me, then look with my eyes and you will not mind very much if the courtiers in the ogre's court, or the dock leaves in the Garden of Paradise, are not just as a grown-up person thinks they should be. After all is said and done, what the young ones say about it is the all-important matter."

A decade after his significant literary contribution to Fairy Tales from Hans Christian Andersen (1914), Walker published a short story (dedicated to Charles White Whittlesey) entitled The Dust of Seven Days. The frontispiece to that Limited Edition appears to depict Mr Valiant-for-Truth from The Pilgrim's Progress as he is transported to Heaven - a particularly fitting subject given Walker's dedication.

His work was noted for its fine detail, elaborate stippling, and lavish design.

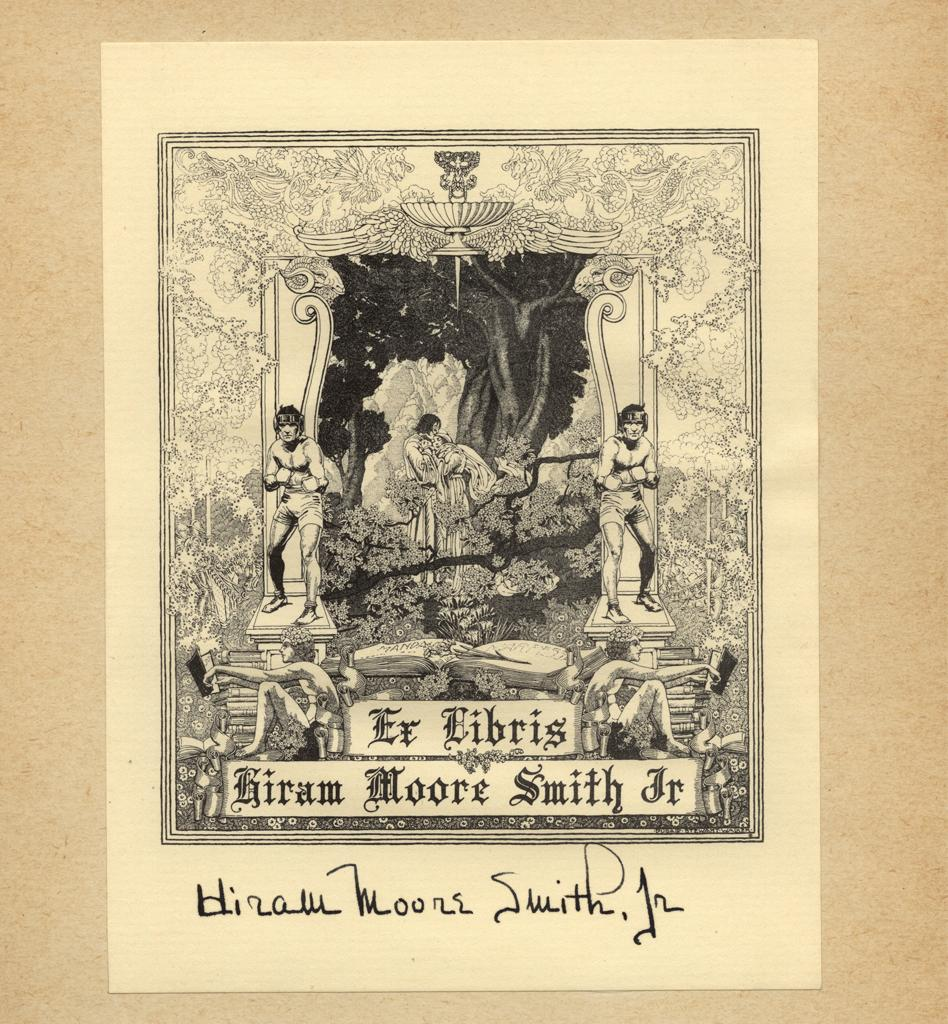
Bookplate by Dugald Stewart Walker

=== Bookplates ===
Walker sold his art in many forms. Though his gallery work brought him international acclaim, it was not popular in Richmond, where he sold his art instead in the form of prints on commissioned bookplates and cards. These monochromatic prints are reminiscent of Aubrey Beardsley. Walker's bookplates use the personalized iconography of his clients—images associated with a client's person, or occupation—and included them in modernist heraldic images.

== Personal life ==
Walker died on February 26, 1937, at a hospital in Richmond. He was buried in Hollywood Cemetery.

== Works ==
=== Author ===
- Dream Boats: And Other Stories, Portraits and Histories of Fauns, Fairies, Fishes and Other Pleasant Creatures. (1918)
- Sally's ABC (1929)
- The Dust of Seven Days (1924)

=== Illustrator ===
- Stories for Pictures (1912)
- Fairy Tales from Hans Christian Andersen (1914)
- The Boy Who Knew What the Birds Said (1918)
- Dream Boats and Other Stories (1918)
- The Wishing-Fairy's Animal Friends (1921)
- Rainbow Gold (1922)
- Snythergen (1923)
- The Six Who Were Left in a Shoe (1923)
- Many Wings (1923)
- Squiffer (1924)
- The Golden Porch (1925)
- Wonder Tales from China Seas (1925)
- Orpheus with His Lute (1926)
- Mopsa the Fairy (1927)
- Garden of the Heart compiled by Frances Esty (1930).
