= Dugal =

Dugal is a surname with multiple possible origins – French, Scottish, or Punjabi. In French, Dugal can be a patronymic fusing "of the" with the personal name "Gal". In French Canadian, Dugal can be an altered form of the personal name "Tugal" which itself is derived from the Germanic "Tugwald".

The Scottish name Dugal is derived from the Gaelic personal name Dùghall (variously spelt), or else from a reduced form of the surname MacDougall (which is an Anglicised surname originating from a patronymic form of Dùghall, Dubhghall, etc.). The Gaelic Dùghall and Dubhghall are composed of elements dubh and gall, meaning "dark" and "stranger."

In other cases, the surname is of Punjabi origin, as a Khatri and Sikh name based upon the name of a Khatri clan. This Indian surname is more often spelt Duggal. Dugal is also a surname of a Marathi family originally given by the rulers of the Peshwa dynasty meaning the third line people in the war.

== People ==
- Rasika Dugal (born 1985) , Indian actress
- Jules Dugal (1888–1975), Canadian ice hockey coach
- Louis-Auguste Dugal (1869–1926), Canadian politician
- Marianne Dugal, Canadian musician
