= John Dougall (merchant) =

- Born: 8 July 1808; Paisley, Scotland
- Died: 18 August 1886 (aged 78); Montreal, Quebec
- Occupations: Merchant, Newspaper editor
- Known for: Montreal Witness
- Relatives: James Dougall (brother)

John Dougall (8 July 1808 – 18 August 1886) was a merchant and the founder of the Montreal Witness.

== Biography ==
Dougall was born in Paisley, Scotland and was raised in the cloth trade there. He emigrated to Canada in 1826 and was followed by his brother.

He and his brother James Dougall began with the selling of dry goods, first in Quebec, and later moving the business to Montreal and York, in the Toronto region. They were later joined by their father in 1828.

In 1845, he founded the Montreal Witness (1845–1938), hostile to Catholics. For example, he persisted in accusing the mayor of Montreal, Charles Wilson, for the Gavazzi Riots.

In 1871, Dougall also founded the New York Daily Witness, which had failed by 1878, but his companion New York Weekly Witness survived, and was later run by Dougall's son James, publishing until 1920.

His daughter Lily Dougall was a writer. His son J.R. (John Redpath) Dougall was a journalist, social reformer, and businessman who took over editorship of the Montreal Daily Witness and Weekly Witness in 1871 when his father left for New York.
