= Fred W. Anderson =

American legislator and lawyer

Member of the Illinois House of Representatives
- In office 1957–1958

Personal details
- Party: Democratic
- Education: University of Chicago
- Occupation: Politician, lawyer

Fred W. Anderson was an American legislator and lawyer.

From Downers Grove, Illinois, Anderson received his bachelor's and law degrees from the University of Chicago. In 1929, Anderson was admitted to the Illinois bar and practiced law in Downers Grove. In 1957 and 1958, Anderson served in the Illinois House of Representatives and was a Democrat.
