= List of United Kingdom locations: Gm-Gq =

The United Kingdom

This is part of the list of United Kingdom locations: a gazetteer of place names in the United Kingdom showing each place's locality and geographical coordinates.

== Gn ==
Location	Locality	Coordinates (links to map & photo sources)	OS grid reference
Gnosall	Staffordshire	52.78°N 02.25°W	SJ8321
Gnosall Heath	Staffordshire	52.77°N 02.26°W	SJ8220

== Go ==
=== Goa-Gon ===
Location	Locality	Coordinates (links to map & photo sources)	OS grid reference
Goadby	Leicestershire	52.57°N 00.89°W	SP7598
Goadby Marwood	Leicestershire	52.82°N 00.84°W	SK7826
Goatacre	Wiltshire	51.49°N 01.98°W	SU0177
Goatfield	Argyll and Bute	56.15°N 05.20°W	NN0100
Goatham Green	East Sussex	50.95°N 00.57°E	TQ8120
Goathill	Dorset	50.95°N 02.47°W	ST6717
Goathland	North Yorkshire	54.39°N 00.72°W	NZ8301
Goathurst	Somerset	51.10°N 03.07°W	ST2534
Goathurst Common	Kent	51.24°N 00.13°E	TQ4952
Gobley Hole	Hampshire	51.20°N 01.12°W	SU6145
Gobowen	Shropshire	52.89°N 03.04°W	SJ3033
Godalming	Surrey	51.17°N 00.62°W	SU9643
Goddards	Buckinghamshire	51.60°N 00.87°W	SU7890
Goddard's Corner	Suffolk	52.26°N 01.34°E	TM2868
Goddard's Green	Kent	51.07°N 00.58°E	TQ8134
Goddards Green	West Sussex	50.96°N 00.17°W	TQ2820
Goddard's Green	Berkshire	51.38°N 01.05°W	SU6666
Godden Green	Kent	51.27°N 00.22°E	TQ5555
Goddington	Bromley	51.36°N 00.11°E	TQ4765
Godley	Tameside	53.45°N 02.07°W	SJ9595
Godleybrook	Staffordshire	52.99°N 02.04°W	SJ9744
Godley Hill	Tameside	53.44°N 02.06°W	SJ9694
Godleys Green	East Sussex	50.95°N 00.05°W	TQ3719
Godmanchester	Cambridgeshire	52.31°N 00.18°W	TL2470
Godmanstone	Dorset	50.77°N 02.48°W	SY6697
Godmersham	Kent	51.21°N 00.94°E	TR0650
Godney	Somerset	51.17°N 02.74°W	ST4842
Godolphin Cross	Cornwall	50.13°N 05.35°W	SW6031
Godre'r-graig	Neath Port Talbot	51.73°N 03.81°W	SN7506
God's Blessing Green	Dorset	50.82°N 01.95°W	SU0303
Godshill	Isle of Wight	50.62°N 01.26°W	SZ5281
Godshill	Hampshire	50.92°N 01.75°W	SU1714
Godstone	Staffordshire	52.91°N 01.98°W	SK0135
Godstone	Surrey	51.24°N 00.06°W	TQ3551
Godwinscroft	Hampshire	50.76°N 01.73°W	SZ1996
Godwell	Devon	50.37°N 03.91°W	SX6455
Godwick	Norfolk	52.76°N 00.81°E	TF9022
Goetre	Monmouthshire	51.73°N 02.98°W	SO3205
Goferydd	Isle of Anglesey	53.30°N 04.70°W	SH2082
Goff's Oak	Hertfordshire	51.71°N 00.09°W	TL3203
Gogar	City of Edinburgh	55.93°N 03.34°W	NT1672
Goginan	Ceredigion	52.41°N 03.94°W	SN6881
Golan	Gwynedd	52.95°N 04.20°W	SH5242
Golant	Cornwall	50.35°N 04.64°W	SX1254
Golberdon	Cornwall	50.51°N 04.37°W	SX3271
Golborne	Wigan	53.46°N 02.58°W	SJ6197
Golcar	Kirklees	53.64°N 01.85°W	SE1016
Golch	Flintshire	53.28°N 03.26°W	SJ1677
Goldcliff	City of Newport	51.54°N 02.92°W	ST3683
Gold Cliff	City of Newport	51.52°N 02.90°W	ST3781
Golden Balls	Oxfordshire	51.66°N 01.20°W	SU5597
Golden Cross (Herstmonceux)	East Sussex	50.86°N 00.31°E	TQ6310
Golden Cross (Chiddingly)	East Sussex	50.88°N 00.17°E	TQ5312
Golden Green	Kent	51.20°N 00.33°E	TQ6348
Golden Grove	Carmarthenshire	51.85°N 04.06°W	SN5819
Golden Hill	Hampshire	50.75°N 01.63°W	SZ2695
Golden Hill (Spittal)	Pembrokeshire	51.87°N 04.95°W	SM9724
Golden Hill (Pembroke)	Pembrokeshire	51.68°N 04.92°W	SM9802
Golden Hill	City of Bristol	51.48°N 02.60°W	ST5876
Goldenhill	City of Stoke-on-Trent	53.07°N 02.22°W	SJ8553
Golden Park	Devon	50.95°N 04.52°W	SS2320
Golden Pot	Hampshire	51.18°N 00.99°W	SU7043
Golden Valley	Herefordshire	52.13°N 02.49°W	SO6649
Golden Valley	Gloucestershire	51.89°N 02.14°W	SO9022
Golden Valley	Derbyshire	53.05°N 01.37°W	SK4251
Golder Field	Herefordshire	52.24°N 02.64°W	SO5661
Golders Green	Barnet	51.57°N 00.21°W	TQ2488
Goldfinch Bottom	Berkshire	51.37°N 01.28°W	SU5064
Goldhanger	Essex	51.73°N 00.75°E	TL9008
Gold Hill	Dorset	50.91°N 02.25°W	ST8213
Goldington	Bedfordshire	52.13°N 00.43°W	TL0750
Goldsborough (Harrogate)	North Yorkshire	53.99°N 01.42°W	SE3856
Goldsborough (Lythe, near Whitby)	North Yorkshire	54.51°N 00.71°W	NZ8314
Gold's Cross	Bath and North East Somerset	51.33°N 02.59°W	ST5960
Golds Green	Sandwell	52.53°N 02.03°W	SO9893
Goldsithney	Cornwall	50.11°N 05.44°W	SW5430
Goldstone	Shropshire	52.84°N 02.44°W	SJ7028
Goldthorn Park	Wolverhampton	52.56°N 02.13°W	SO9196
Goldthorpe	Barnsley	53.53°N 01.30°W	SE4604
Goldworthy	Devon	50.97°N 04.29°W	SS3922
Golford	Kent	51.09°N 00.55°E	TQ7936
Golftyn	Flintshire	53.22°N 03.07°W	SJ2870
Golgotha	Kent	51.18°N 01.23°E	TR2648
Gollachy	Moray	57.66°N 03.02°W	NJ3964
Gollawater	Cornwall	50.30°N 05.16°W	SW7550
Gollinglith Foot	North Yorkshire	54.21°N 01.77°W	SE1580
Golly	Wrexham	53.11°N 03.00°W	SJ3358
Golsoncott	Somerset	51.14°N 03.40°W	ST0239
Golspie	Highland	57.96°N 03.97°W	NH8399
Golynos	Torfaen	51.72°N 03.08°W	SO2504
Gomeldon	Wiltshire	51.11°N 01.72°W	SU1935
Gomersal	Kirklees	53.73°N 01.69°W	SE2026
Gometra	Argyll and Bute	56.48°N 06.28°W	NM361412
Gomshall	Surrey	51.21°N 00.45°W	TQ0847
Gonalston	Nottinghamshire	53.01°N 01.00°W	SK6747
Gonamena	Cornwall	50.50°N 04.45°W	SX2670
Gonerby Hill Foot	Lincolnshire	52.92°N 00.66°W	SK9037
Gonfirth	Shetland Islands	60.33°N 01.33°W	HU3761

=== Goo ===
Location	Locality	Coordinates (links to map & photo sources)	OS grid reference
Good Easter	Essex	51.78°N 00.34°E	TL6212
Gooderstone	Norfolk	52.58°N 00.59°E	TF7602
Goodleigh	Devon	51.08°N 04.01°W	SS5934
Goodley Stock	Kent	51.24°N 00.06°E	TQ4452
Goodmanham	East Riding of Yorkshire	53.87°N 00.66°W	SE8843
Goodmayes	Redbridge	51.55°N 00.10°E	TQ4686
Goodnestone (Dover)	Kent	51.24°N 01.22°E	TR2554
Goodnestone (Swale)	Kent	51.31°N 00.92°E	TR0461
Goodrich	Herefordshire	51.86°N 02.62°W	SO5719
Goodrington	Devon	50.41°N 03.57°W	SX8858
Good's Green	Worcestershire	52.42°N 02.32°W	SO7881
Goodshaw	Lancashire	53.72°N 02.28°W	SD8125
Goodshaw Chapel	Lancashire	53.73°N 02.28°W	SD8126
Goodshaw Fold	Lancashire	53.73°N 02.30°W	SD8026
Goodstone	Devon	50.52°N 03.72°W	SX7871
Goodwick / Wdig	Pembrokeshire	52.00°N 05.00°W	SM9438
Goodworth Clatford	Hampshire	51.17°N 01.48°W	SU3642
Goodyers End	Warwickshire	52.46°N 01.51°W	SP3385
Goodyhills	Cumbria	54.80°N 03.40°W	NY1046
Goole	East Riding of Yorkshire	53.69°N 00.88°W	SE7423
Goom's Hill	Worcestershire	52.18°N 01.97°W	SP0254
Goonabarn	Cornwall	50.35°N 04.88°W	SW9554
Goonbell	Cornwall	50.29°N 05.20°W	SW7249
Goon Gumpas	Cornwall	50.23°N 05.17°W	SW7442
Goonhavern	Cornwall	50.33°N 05.12°W	SW7853
Goonhusband	Cornwall	50.07°N 05.27°W	SW6625
Goonlaze	Cornwall	50.18°N 05.20°W	SW7137
Goonown	Cornwall	50.30°N 05.20°W	SW7250
Goon Piper	Cornwall	50.21°N 05.07°W	SW8139
Goonvrea	Cornwall	50.29°N 05.23°W	SW7049
Gooseberry Green	Essex	51.62°N 00.41°E	TQ6795
Goose Eye	Bradford	53.85°N 01.97°W	SE0240
Gooseford	Devon	50.70°N 03.88°W	SX6791
Goose Green	Cumbria	54.25°N 02.70°W	SD5484
Goose Green (Tendring)	Essex	51.88°N 01.10°E	TM1425
Goose Green (Wix)	Essex	51.90°N 01.09°E	TM1327
Goose Green	Hampshire	50.86°N 01.57°W	SU3007
Goose Green	Hertfordshire	51.76°N 00.04°W	TL3509
Goose Green (Hadlow)	Kent	51.22°N 00.34°E	TQ6450
Goose Green (Biddenden)	Kent	51.10°N 00.62°E	TQ8437
Goose Green	Lancashire	53.69°N 02.80°W	SD4722
Goose Green	Norfolk	52.44°N 01.10°E	TM1187
Goose Green	South Gloucestershire	51.54°N 02.41°W	ST7183
Goose Green (Harting)	West Sussex	50.98°N 00.90°W	SU7721
Goose Green (Thakeham)	West Sussex	50.95°N 00.42°W	TQ1118
Goose Green	Wigan	53.52°N 02.66°W	SD5603
Gooseham	Cornwall	50.91°N 04.53°W	SS2216
Gooseham Mill	Cornwall	50.92°N 04.52°W	SS2317
Goose Hill	Hampshire	51.35°N 01.24°W	SU5362
Goosehill	Wakefield	53.68°N 01.44°W	SE3721
Goosehill Green	Worcestershire	52.24°N 02.10°W	SO9361
Goosemoor	Devon	50.69°N 03.33°W	SY0689
Goosemoor	Staffordshire	52.75°N 02.26°W	SJ8217
Goosemoor Green	Staffordshire	52.69°N 01.91°W	SK0611
Goosenford	Somerset	51.03°N 03.08°W	ST2427
Goose Pool	Herefordshire	52.02°N 02.78°W	SO4636
Goosewell	Devon	51.20°N 04.07°W	SS5547
Goosey	Oxfordshire	51.61°N 01.49°W	SU3591
Goosnargh	Lancashire	53.81°N 02.68°W	SD5536
Goostrey	Cheshire	53.22°N 02.34°W	SJ7770

=== Gor-Goz ===
Location	Locality	Coordinates (links to map & photo sources)	OS grid reference
Gorbals	City of Glasgow	55.84°N 04.25°W	NS5964
Gorcott Hill	Warwickshire	52.31°N 01.86°W	SP0968
Gord	Shetland Islands	60.04°N 01.22°W	HU4329
Gorddinog	Gwynedd	53.23°N 03.99°W	SH6773
Gordon	Scottish Borders	55.67°N 02.57°W	NT6443
Gordonbush	Highland	58.05°N 03.96°W	NC8409
Gordonsburgh	Moray	57.68°N 02.95°W	NJ4366
Gordonstown (Banff and Buchan)	Aberdeenshire	57.59°N 02.73°W	NJ5656
Gordonstown (Formartine)	Aberdeenshire	57.43°N 02.48°W	NJ7138
Gore	Dorset	50.96°N 02.58°W	ST5918
Gore	Kent	51.24°N 01.29°E	TR3055
Gorebridge	Midlothian	55.83°N 03.05°W	NT3461
Gore End	Hampshire	51.36°N 01.41°W	SU4163
Gorefield	Cambridgeshire	52.67°N 00.08°E	TF4111
Gorehill	West Sussex	50.97°N 00.60°W	SU9820
Gore Pit	Essex	51.83°N 00.71°E	TL8719
Gore Street	Kent	51.33°N 01.25°E	TR2765
Gorgie	City of Edinburgh	55.93°N 03.25°W	NT2272
Gorhambury	Hertfordshire	51.75°N 00.39°W	TL1107
Goring-on-Thames or Goring	Oxfordshire	51.52°N 01.13°W	SU6081
Goring-by-Sea	West Sussex	50.81°N 00.42°W	TQ1103
Goring Heath	Oxfordshire	51.50°N 01.06°W	SU6579
Gorleston-on-Sea	Norfolk	52.56°N 01.71°E	TG5203
Gornalwood	Dudley	52.50°N 02.13°W	SO9190
Gorran Churchtown	Cornwall	50.24°N 04.82°W	SW9942
Gorran Haven	Cornwall	50.23°N 04.80°W	SX0041
Gorran High Lanes	Cornwall	50.25°N 04.83°W	SW9843
Gorrenberry	Scottish Borders	55.26°N 02.85°W	NY4697
Gorrig	Ceredigion	52.05°N 04.33°W	SN4042
Gors / Y Gors	Ceredigion	52.37°N 04.01°W	SN6377
Gorse Covert	Cheshire	53.42°N 02.51°W	SJ6692
Gorsedd	Flintshire	53.27°N 03.27°W	SJ1576
Gorse Hill	Swindon	51.57°N 01.78°W	SU1586
Gorse Hill	Trafford	53.45°N 02.30°W	SJ8095
Gorseinon	Swansea	51.66°N 04.05°W	SS5898
Gorseness	Orkney Islands	59.05°N 03.03°W	HY4119
Gorsethorpe	Nottinghamshire	53.17°N 01.11°W	SK5965
Gorseybank	Derbyshire	53.07°N 01.56°W	SK2953
Gorsgoch	Ceredigion	52.12°N 04.22°W	SN4850
Gorslas	Carmarthenshire	51.79°N 04.07°W	SN5713
Gorsley	Gloucestershire	51.92°N 02.46°W	SO6825
Gorsley Common	Herefordshire	51.92°N 02.48°W	SO6725
Gorstey Ley	Staffordshire	52.67°N 01.91°W	SK0609
Gorstage	Cheshire	53.24°N 02.58°W	SJ6172
Gorstan	Highland	57.61°N 04.71°W	NH3862
Gorstella	Cheshire	53.15°N 02.97°W	SJ3562
Gorst Hill	Worcestershire	52.34°N 02.38°W	SO7472
Gorstyhill	Cheshire	53.04°N 02.38°W	SJ7450
Gorsty Hill	Staffordshire	52.85°N 01.85°W	SK1029
Gorteneorn	Highland	56.73°N 05.87°W	NM6367
Gortenfern	Highland	56.74°N 05.92°W	NM6068
Gorton	Manchester	53.46°N 02.18°W	SJ8896
Gortonallister	North Ayrshire	55.51°N 05.12°W	NS0329
Gortonronach	Argyll and Bute	56.07°N 05.32°W	NR9392
Gosbeck	Suffolk	52.15°N 01.14°E	TM1555
Gosberton	Lincolnshire	52.86°N 00.15°W	TF2431
Gosberton Cheal	Lincolnshire	52.83°N 00.19°W	TF2228
Gosberton Clough	Lincolnshire	52.84°N 00.23°W	TF1929
Goscote	Walsall	52.60°N 01.97°W	SK0201
Goseley Dale	Derbyshire	52.77°N 01.52°W	SK3220
Gosfield	Essex	51.93°N 00.58°E	TL7829
Gosford	Devon	50.76°N 03.29°W	SY0997
Gosford	Herefordshire	52.30°N 02.69°W	SO5368
Gosford	Oxfordshire	51.81°N 01.29°W	SP4913
Gosford Green	Coventry	52.39°N 01.50°W	SP3478
Gosforth	Newcastle upon Tyne	55.00°N 01.64°W	NZ2368
Gosforth	Cumbria	54.41°N 03.45°W	NY0603
Gosforth Valley	Derbyshire	53.29°N 01.49°W	SK3478
Gosland Green	Suffolk	52.12°N 00.56°E	TL7650
Gosling Green	Suffolk	52.04°N 00.87°E	TL9742
Gosmere	Kent	51.27°N 00.89°E	TR0257
Gosmore	Hertfordshire	51.92°N 00.28°W	TL1827
Gospel Ash	Staffordshire	52.51°N 02.25°W	SO8391
Gospel End	Staffordshire	52.53°N 02.16°W	SO8993
Gospel Green	West Sussex	51.07°N 00.65°W	SU9431
Gospel Oak	Camden	51.54°N 00.15°W	TQ2885
Gosport (Portsmouth)	Hampshire	50.79°N 01.16°W	SU5900
Gosport (Test Valley)	Hampshire	50.99°N 01.44°W	SU3922
Gossabrough	Shetland Islands	60.52°N 01.05°W	HU5283
Gossard's Green	Bedfordshire	52.07°N 00.60°W	SP9643
Gossington	Gloucestershire	51.71°N 02.39°W	SO7302
Gossops Green	West Sussex	51.10°N 00.21°W	TQ2536
Gotham	Dorset	50.89°N 01.88°W	SU0811
Gotham	East Sussex	50.85°N 00.41°E	TQ7009
Gotham	Nottinghamshire	52.86°N 01.21°W	SK5330
Gothelney Green	Somerset	51.12°N 03.07°W	ST2537
Gotherington	Gloucestershire	51.95°N 02.05°W	SO9629
Gothers	Cornwall	50.38°N 04.87°W	SW9658
Gott	Shetland Islands	60.19°N 01.22°W	HU4346
Gott	Argyll and Bute	56.51°N 06.83°W	NM0346
Gotton	Somerset	51.04°N 03.08°W	ST2428
Goudhurst	Kent	51.10°N 00.45°E	TQ7237
Goulceby	Lincolnshire	53.29°N 00.12°W	TF2579
Goulton	North Yorkshire	54.42°N 01.27°W	NZ4704
Gourdie	City of Dundee	56.47°N 03.05°W	NO3532
Gourdon	Aberdeenshire	56.82°N 02.29°W	NO8270
Gourock	Inverclyde	55.95°N 04.82°W	NS2477
Govan	City of Glasgow	55.85°N 04.31°W	NS5565
Govanhill	City of Glasgow	55.83°N 04.26°W	NS5862
Gover Hill	Kent	51.24°N 00.33°E	TQ6352
Goverton	Nottinghamshire	53.04°N 00.95°W	SK7050
Goveton	Devon	50.30°N 03.75°W	SX7546
Govig	Western Isles	57.97°N 07.05°W	NB0109
Govilon	Monmouthshire	51.81°N 03.07°W	SO2613
Gowanbank	Angus	56.64°N 02.88°W	NO4651
Gowanwell	Aberdeenshire	57.45°N 02.20°W	NJ8841
Gowdall	East Riding of Yorkshire	53.69°N 01.06°W	SE6222
Gowerton	Swansea	51.64°N 04.03°W	SS5996
Gowhole	Derbyshire	53.34°N 01.98°W	SK0183
Gowkhall	Fife	56.08°N 03.52°W	NT0589
Gowkthrapple	North Lanarkshire	55.75°N 03.92°W	NS7953
Gowthorpe	East Riding of Yorkshire	53.97°N 00.84°W	SE7654
Goxhill	East Riding of Yorkshire	53.87°N 00.20°W	TA1844
Goxhill	North Lincolnshire	53.67°N 00.33°W	TA1021
Goytre	Neath Port Talbot	51.58°N 03.76°W	SS7889
Gozzard's Ford	Oxfordshire	51.67°N 01.33°W	SU4698
