= Gorran =

Gorran may refer to:

== Geographic places ==
- St Goran, a civil parish in Cornwall which includes the settlements of:
  - Gorran Churchtown
  - Gorran Haven
- Gorran, County Londonderry, a townland in County Londonderry, Northern Ireland

== People ==
- Nicholas of Gorran, a French preacher

== Political parties ==
- Gorran Movement, the Movement for Change in Iraqi Kurdistan
