= Gordonstown =

Gordonstown is a name shared by two settlements in Aberdeenshire, Scotland:

- Gordonstown, Banff and Buchan, in Ordiquhill parish
- Gordonstown, Formartine, in Auchterless parish

== See also ==
- Gordonstoun, an unrelated school in Moray, Scotland
