= A95 road =

Road in Scotland

A95

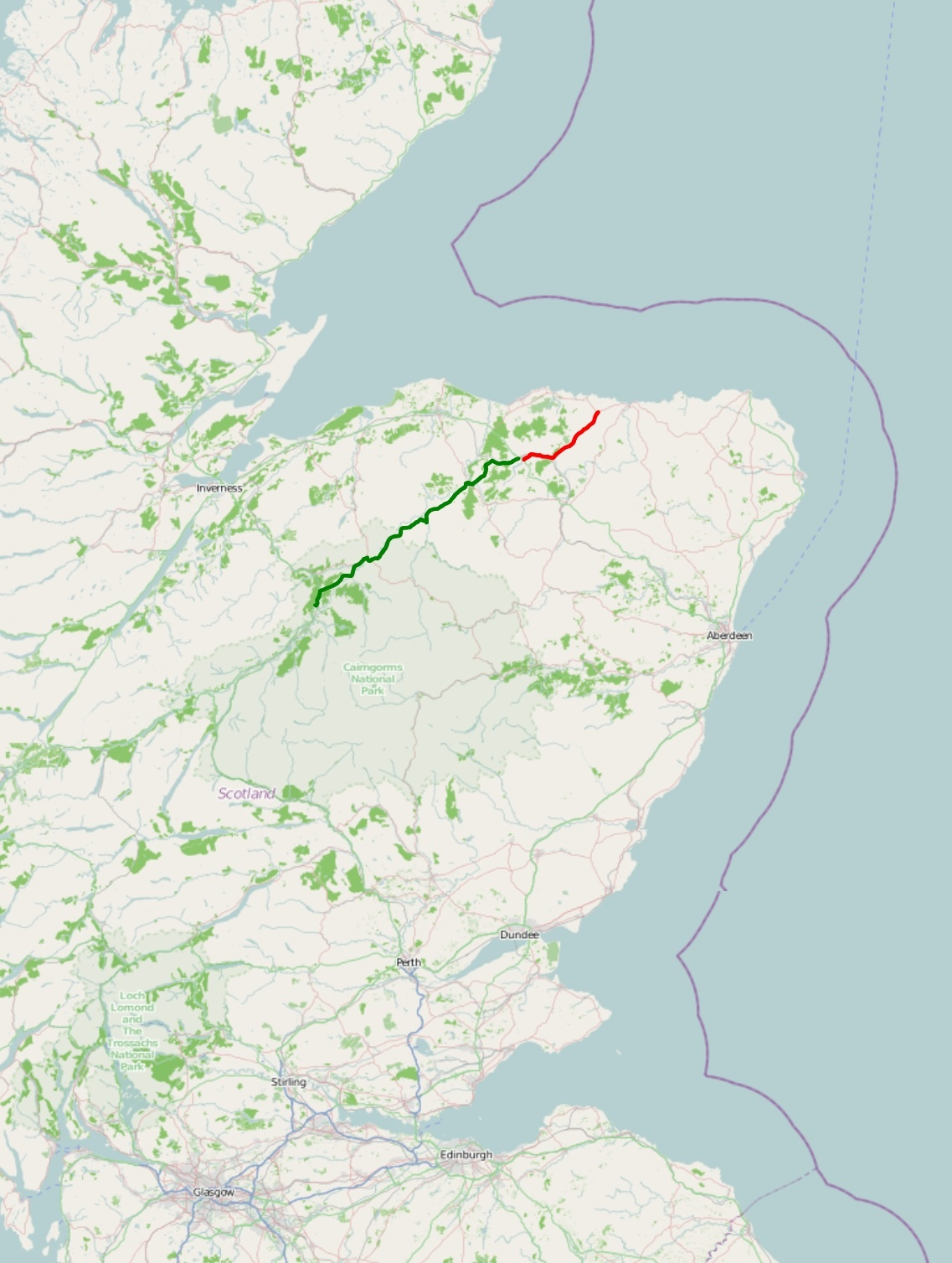
- Click map to enlarge

Route information
- Length: 62.7 mi (100.9 km)

Major junctions
- Southwest end: A9 near Aviemore; 57.2153°N 3.8235°W
- A96 near Keith
- North end: A98 near Boyndie; 57.6498°N 2.6392°W

Location
- Country: United Kingdom
- Constituent country: Scotland
- Council areas: Highland, Moray, Aberdeenshire
- Primary destinations: Aviemore, Grantown-on-Spey, Banff

Road network
- Roads in the United Kingdom; Motorways; A and B road zones
| ← A94 | → A96 |

The A95 road is a major road of north-east Scotland connecting the A9 road in the Highlands to the A98 road near the coast.

== Route ==
It leaves the A9 four miles north of Aviemore.

It then goes:

- through Drumullie;
- near to Dulnain Bridge – junction with A938 road;
- through Craggan
- near to Grantown-on-Spey – junctions with A939 road;
- through Cromdale
- through Mains of Dalvey;
- over the Bridge of Avon;
- through Aberlour;
- through Craigellachie – junctions with A941 road;
- through Maggieknockater, Mulben, Tauchers and Rosarie;
- joins the A96 road west of Keith leaving it east of that town;
- through Farmtown, Drumnagarroch, Glenbarry, Gordonstown and Cornhill

It ends with a junction with the A98 road between Portsoy and Banff.

== Junction list ==
| Council area | Location | mi | km | Destinations | Notes |
|---|---|---|---|---|---|
| Highland | | 0.0 | 0.0 | A9 – Perth, Inverness | Southwest terminus |
| Highland | | 9.6– 10.2 | 15.4– 16.4 | A938 west – Carrbridge, Dulnain Bridge, Skye of Curr | Eastern terminus of A938 |
| Highland | | 12.4 | 20.0 | A939 north to Old Military Road / A940 – Nairn, Grantown-on-Spey, Forres | Southwest terminus of A939 concurrency |
| Highland | | 13.3 | 21.4 | A939 south to A93 – Braemar, Tomintoul | Northeast terminus of A939 concurrency |
| Moray | Craigellachie | 35.1 | 56.5 | A941 south (Edward Avenue) – Dufftown, Cabrach | Southwest terminus of A941 concurrency |
| Moray | Craigellachie | 35.3 | 56.8 | A941 north – Elgin, Rothes | Rothes signed northeast only; northeast terminus of A941 concurrency |
| Moray | | 46.4 | 74.7 | A96 west – Inverness, Elgin | Southwest terminus of A96 concurrency |
| Moray | Keith | 47.3 | 76.1 | A96 east (Church Road) / Mid Street – Aberdeen | No access to Mid Street from A95; northeast terminus of A96 concurrency |
| Aberdeenshire | | 62.7 | 100.9 | A98 to A96 – Inverness, Fraserburgh | Northeast terminus |
1.000 mi = 1.609 km; 1.000 km = 0.621 mi: Concurrency terminus; Incomplete access
