= Lamledra House =

House in Cornwall, England

Coordinates: 50.237°N 4.788°W

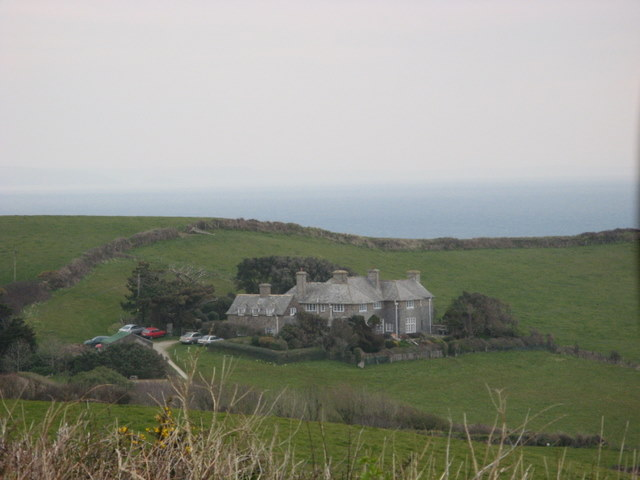
Lamledra House

Lamledra House is a house near Gorran Haven in Cornwall, England, UK. It is situated immediately above Vault Beach. It was built in 1911 by the barrister, John Fischer Williams, and extended in the 1920s. It was formerly the vacation residence of the Oxford academics Herbert and Jenifer Hart, who inherited the house with her sister from their father.
