= David Grieve =

Scottish lawyer and amateur geologist

David Grieve FRSE PRPSE FSA FGS FEGS (1808–1889) was a Scottish lawyer and amateur geologist. He served as president of the Royal Physical Society of Edinburgh from 1874 to 1877.

== Life ==
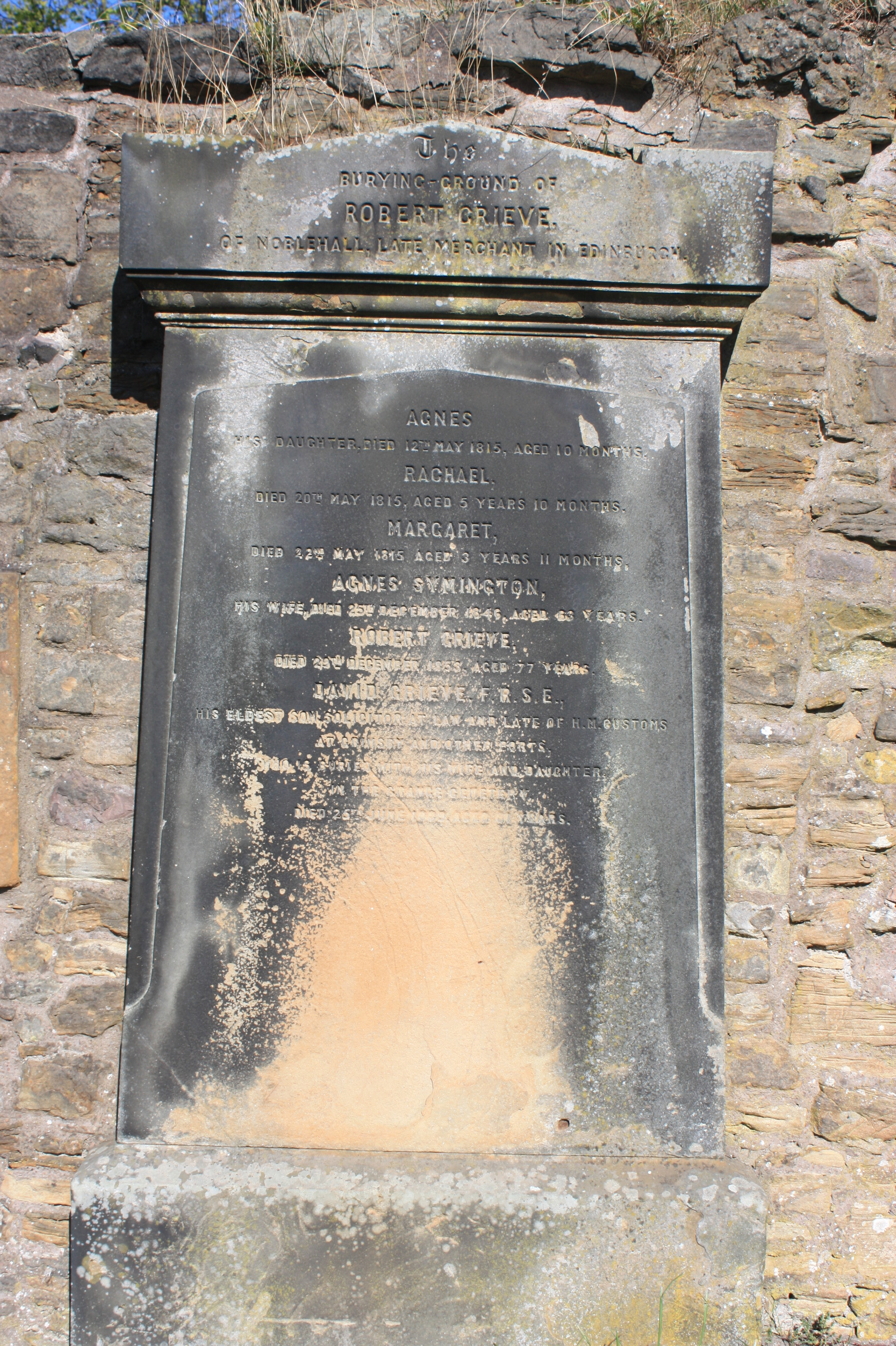
The Grieve family grave in Greyfriars Kirkyard, Edinburgh

He was born in Leith on 9 February 1808, probably the son of Agnes Symington (d.1846) and Robert Grieve (1776–1855), a ship-chandler on The Shore. He studied law at the University of Edinburgh.

He spent much of his working life in his role as a Collector for HM Customs. This was first based at Banff in Scotland before being relocated to the south coast of England, being based at both Grimsby and Dover.

He was a member of a local geological society in Banff and presented it with a rare sample of graptolite in 1853. Here he was both a colleague and friend of Charles William Peach, father to Ben Peach.

In 1872 he was elected a Fellow of the Royal Society of Edinburgh his proposer being James McBain. He is known to have made several studies in the quarry within Arthur’s Seat south-east of the city.

At the time of his Presidency of the RPSE he was living at 2 Keir Street, off Lauriston Place.

He died in Edinburgh on 25 June 1889. He is buried in the Grange Cemetery. He is also memorialised on his parents' grave in the western section of Greyfriars Kirkyard.
