= Royal Physical Society of Edinburgh =

Scottish learned society

The Royal Physical Society of Edinburgh was a learned society based in Edinburgh, Scotland "for the cultivation of the physical sciences".

The society was founded in 1771 as the Physico-Chirurgical Society but soon after changed its name to the Physical Society. After being granted a Royal Charter in 1778 it became the Royal Physical Society of Edinburgh.

It absorbed a number of other societies over the next fifty years, including the Edinburgh Medico-Chirurgical Society in 1782 (not to be confused with the extant Medico-Chirurgical Society of Edinburgh, founded in 1821), the American Physical Society in 1796 (not to be confused with the extant American Physical Society, founded in 1899), the Hibernian Medical Society in 1799, the Chemical Society in 1803, the Natural History Society in 1812 and the Didactic Society in 1813.

The society occupied a lecture hall in Nicholson Street, Edinburgh, complete with library. From 1854 to 1965, it published the journal Proceedings of the Royal Physical Society of Edinburgh, devoted to articles on experimental biology and natural history.

Members of the society were known as Fellows and permitted to use the post-nominal letters FRPSE. Presidents were elected at intervals, sometimes more than one for each year.

Some of the records of the Society, for the period 1828–1884, are maintained by the Royal Scottish Geographical Society.

== Presidents of the Society ==
- 1776–77 John Grieve
- 1813 John Roche
- 18nn Henry von Heydeloff
- 1828 Richard Tuite
- c.1837 William B. Carpenter
- 1840 Edward Forbes
- 1846–48 Robert Halliday Gunning
- 1851–54 Hugh Miller
- 1856 Robert Chambers
- 1858–59 Andrew Murray
- 1858–59 Professor Balfour
- 1861–64 James McBain
- 1861 William Rhind
- 1862 Thomas Strethill Wright
- 1863 Alexander Bryson
- 1863–66 Sir William Turner
- 1864 David Page
- 1865–68 Stevenson Macadam
- 1866–68 John Duns
- 1870–73 Robert Brown
- 1874–77 David Grieve
- 1876 John Alexander Smith
- 1876–79 Ramsay Heatley Traquair
- 1880 John Duns
- 1881–84 Ramsay Heatley Traquair
- 1885–88 Sir William Turner
- 1888–91 Ramsay Heatley Traquair
- 1895 John Struthers
- 1906–09 John Graham Kerr
- 1909?–1912 J Arthur Thomson
- 1912–15 Orlando Charnock Bradley
- 1916 Professor Arthur Robinson
- 1918–21 James Hartley Ashworth
- 1921–24 Professor D'Arcy Wentworth Thompson
- 1933–36 Charles Henry O'Donoghue
