= Maggieknockater =

Coordinates: 57.49630°N 3.14619°W

Maggieknockater: Scottish Gaelic: Magh an Fhùcadair
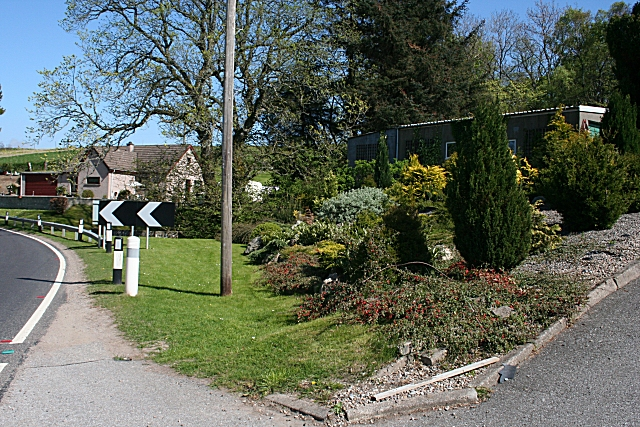
- Maggieknockater

- Location within Moray
- OS grid reference: NJ317458
- Council area: Moray
- Lieutenancy area: Banffshire
- Country: Scotland
- Sovereign state: United Kingdom
- Post town: ABERLOUR
- Postcode district: AB38
- Police: Scotland
- Fire: Scottish
- Ambulance: Scottish
- UK Parliament: Moray West, Nairn and Strathspey
- Scottish Parliament: Moray

Maggieknockater (Scottish Gaelic: Magh an Fhùcadair, meaning "field of the fuller" or "plain of the hilly ridge") is a hamlet on the A95 road between Craigellachie and Mulben in Scotland in the Moray council area, in the county of Banffshire.

Until the early 1970s there was a large apiary which was well known in the region and has lived on in the Scottish country dance "The Bees of Maggieknockater". At nearby Gauldwell Castle (now only with one partial wall left standing), Mary, Queen of Scots is reputed to have spent the night. The school was closed in the 1960s and the chapel was turned into a home in the early 1970s. What was once a smithy is now a garage still in the hands of the Maclean family. Maggieknockater formerly had a post office; it opened in June 1876 and closed in 1940.

Maggieknockater is situated in the heart of Scotland's Malt Whisky Trail, situated less than 4 miles (6.4 km) from Dufftown, home of the world-famous Glenfiddich Distillery.

Less than 2 miles (3 km) heading east along the A95 from Maggieknockater is the site for Moray's most demanding mountain biking trails, "The Moray Monster Trails". The trails were regenerated and improved during 2005 and 2006.
