= Andrew Murray (naturalist) =

Scottish lawyer, botanist, zoologist and entomologist

Andrew D. Murray
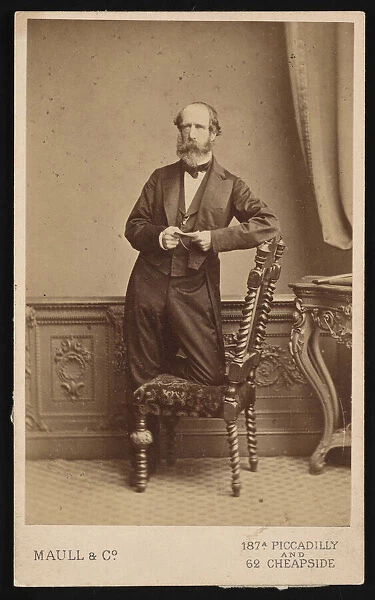
- Born: 19 February 1812; Edinburgh
- Died: 10 January 1878 (aged 65); Kensington, London
- Known for: Botanist, zoologist and entomologist
- Awards: Fellow of the Royal Society of Edinburgh; Fellow of the Linnean Society, President of the Royal Physical Society of Edinburgh
- Scientific career
- Author abbrev. (botany): A.Murray bis
- Author abbrev. (zoology): Murray

Andrew Dickson Murray FRSE FRPSE FLS (19 February 1812, Edinburgh – 10 January 1878, Kensington) was a Scottish lawyer, botanist, zoologist and entomologist. Murray studied insects which caused crop damage, specialising in the Coleoptera. In botany, he specialised in the Coniferae, in particular the Pacific Rim conifer species.

He served as president of the Royal Physical Society of Edinburgh during 1858–59.

== Life ==
He was born at 17 Forth Street in Edinburgh, on 19 February 1812, and was son of William Murray WS of Conland (now part of Glenrothes) and Duncrivie (near Kinross), and his wife Mary Thompson (d.1871).

Murray was apprenticed in law under his father, and became a Writer to the Signet in 1837, joined the firm of Murray & Rhind, and for some time practised in Edinburgh.

His earliest scientific papers were entomological, and did not appear until he was forty. On the death of the Rev. John Fleming, professor of natural science in New College, Edinburgh, in 1857, Murray took up his work for one session, and in the same year he became a fellow of the Royal Society of Edinburgh.

On the foundation of the Oregon Exploration Society, he became its secretary, and this apparently first aroused his interest in Western North America and in the Coniferae. In 1858–59, Murray acted as president of the Botanical Society of Edinburgh, and in 1860, abandoning the legal profession, he came to London and became assistant secretary to the Royal Horticultural Society (1860–5). In 1861, he was elected fellow of the Linnean Society. In 1868, he joined the scientific committee of the Royal Horticultural Society, and in 1877 was appointed its scientific director. In 1868, he began the collection of economic entomology for the Science and Art Department, now at the Bethnal Green Museum.

In 1869, he went to St. Petersburg as one of the delegates to the botanical congress, and in 1873 to Utah and California to report on some mining concessions. This latter journey seems to have permanently injured his health. He died at Bedford Gardens, Campden Hill, Kensington, on 10 January 1878.

His chief contributions to entomology deal with Coleoptera, the unfinished monograph of the Nitidulariae, in the Linnean Transactions (vol. xxiv. 1863–4), undertaken at the suggestion of Dr. J. E. Gray, being perhaps the most important. His chief work on the Coniferae was to have been published by the Ray Society, but was never completed.

Murray has been described as a forgotten pioneer in cave biology.

== Opposition to natural selection ==
Murray was a prominent opponent of the Darwin-Wallace model of natural selection. Murray believed that hybridization was a better explanation for mimicry than natural selection. He contended that hybridization, modification and reversion to type had been set in motion by God. Murray used the argument of the absence of intermediate evolutionary forms. He cited the example of eyeless insects of the same genera existing in isolated caves in distant parts of the world as evidence against natural selection. Darwin described his objection as an "ingenious difficulty" but suggested he had little doubt that such insects were examples of living fossils.

In 1860, Murray reviewed Darwin's On the Origin of Species in the Proceedings of the Royal Society of Edinburgh. He had sent proof-sheets of his review to Darwin before it was published. Darwin in a letter to Murray wrote "I thank you from my heart for your most kind letter. I never knew or heard of a hostile Reviewer doing so kind & generous an action."

Some later biographers have described Murray as holding creationist views. However, in his book The Geographical Distribution of Mammals (1866), he stated his issue was with natural selection, not the origin of species and that he "thoroughly accepted the theory that species are not produced by independent creation, but that, under the operation of a general law, the germs of organisms produce new forms different from themselves, when particular circumstances call the law into action." In December, 1868 he presented an anti-Darwinian paper to the Linnean Society.

== Selected publications ==
- 1853 Catalogue of the Coleoptera of Scotland Edinburgh, London, W. Blackwood and sons.
- 1860 On Mr Darwin's theory of the origin of species. Proceedings of the Royal Society of Edinburgh 4: 274–291.
- 1860 On the Disguises of Nature; Being An Inquiry into the Laws which regulate External Form and Colour in Plants and Animals. Edinburgh New Philosophical Journal 11: 66–90.
- 1861 On the pediculi infesting the different races of man Trans. Roy. Soc. Edinb. 22: 567
- 1866 The Geographical Distribution of Mammals
- 1867 List of Coleoptera received from Old Calabar. Annals and Magazine of Natural History (3rd series) 19: 167–179.
- 1868 The Journal of Travel and Natural History. London: Williams & Norgate.
- 1870 Mimicry and Hybridisation. Nature 3: 54–56.
- 1870 On the geographical relations of the chief coleopterous faunae. J. Linn. Soc. 11: 1–89.
- 1871 Mimicry versus Hybridisation. Nature 3: 186–187.
- 1877 Economic entomology Chapman and Hall, London.

== Sources ==
- Anonym 1878 [Murray, A.] Entomologist's Monthly Magazine (3) 14 1877-78 215-216
- Anonym 1879 [Murray, A.] Petites Nouv. Ent. 2 (Nr. 190) 207.
- Kraatz, G. 1878 [Murray, A.] Dtsch. ent. Ztschr. 22 229.
- Marseul, S. A. de 1883 Les Entomologistes et leurs Écrits (Entomologists and their writings) L'Abeille (4) 21(=3) 61-120 106–107.,
- Musgrave, A. 1932 Bibliography of Australian Entomology 1775–1930. Sydney 233.
- Westwood, J. O. 1877 [Murray, A.] Trans. Ent. Soc. London, London [1877] XXXIX.
