= Charles William Peach =

British naturalist and geologist

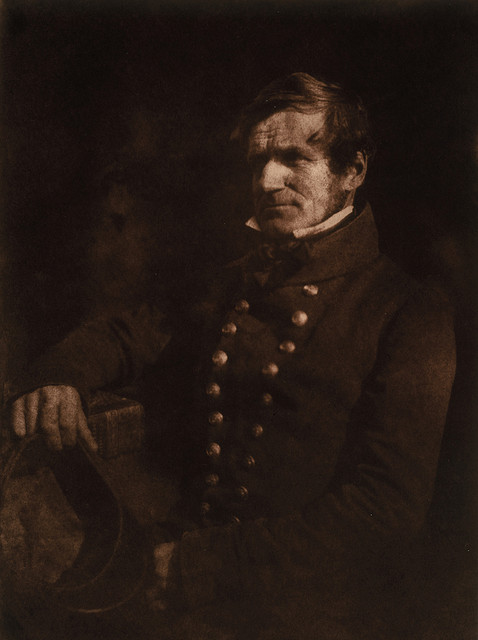
Charles William Peach, 1844

Charles William Peach ALS (30 September 1800 – 28 February 1886) was a British naturalist and geologist. He discovered fossils in Cornwall, after it had been stated by the geologist William Conybeare that there were no fossil-bearing rocks in Cornwall.

Charles William Peach resided at a house in Fowey, a pretty house (then Victoria Cottage) overlooking the English Channel, where he was visited by Alfred Lord Tennyson and Charles Darwin, they would take regular boat trips across St Austell Bay to Mevagissey. Tennyson would be a regular visitor and convalesced at Victoria Cottage during illness.

== Biography ==
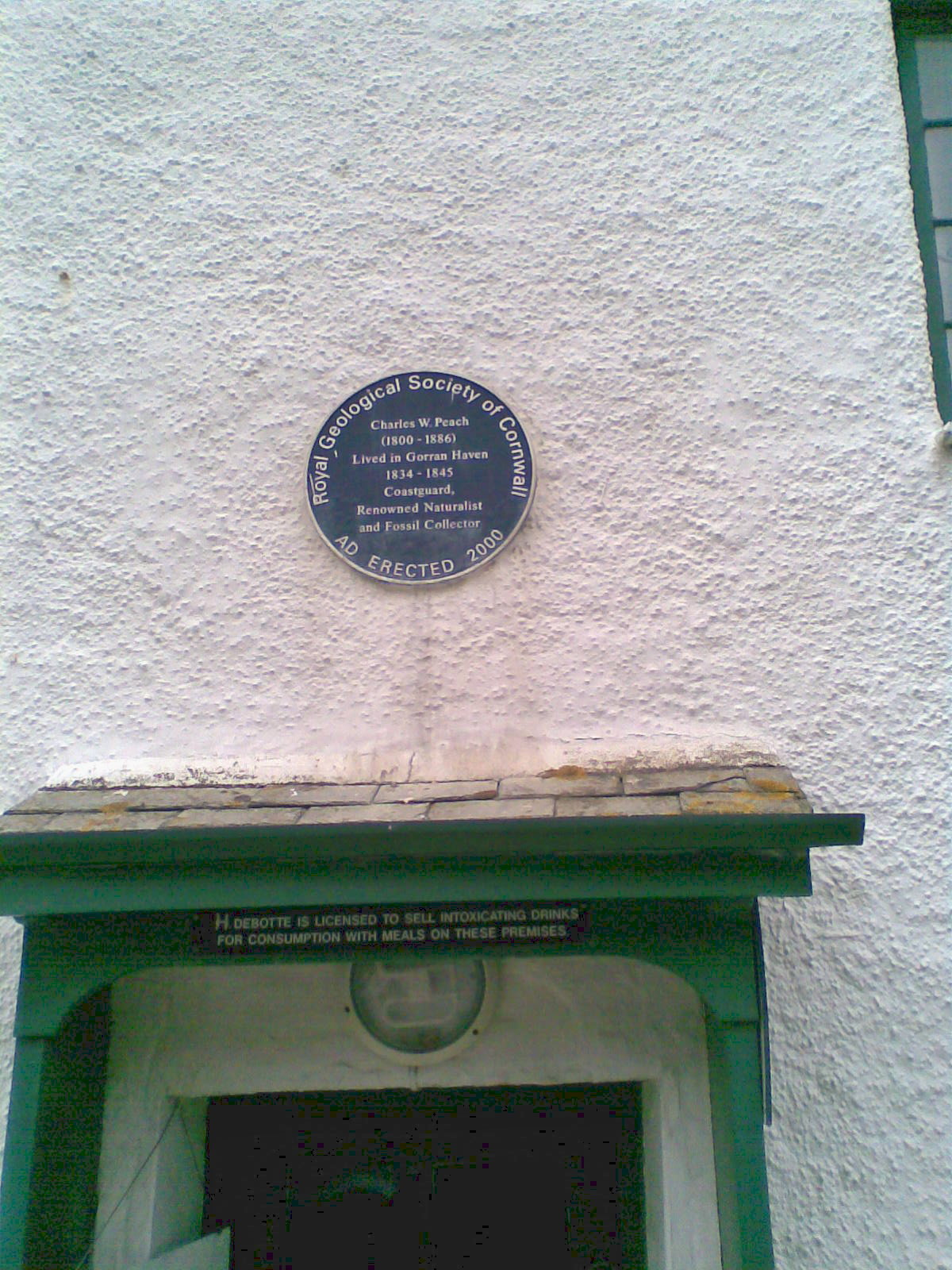
Plaque commemorating C. W. Peach, placed on the former Customs House at Gorran Haven, Cornwall, UK by the Royal Geological Society of Cornwall

He was born at Wansford, then in Northamptonshire; his father at the time was a yeoman farmer, saddler and harness-maker, and innkeeper, farming about eighty acres (0.32 km^{2}) of land. He received an elementary education at Wansford and at Folkingham in Lincolnshire; and assisted for several years in the inn and farm. Peach did not like the drunken behaviour he saw in the inn, and abstained from alcohol all his life.

Unhappy with his situation at home, Peach applied for the position of riding officer in the Revenue Coastguard. He was appointed in January 1824, and took up his station at Weybourne in Norfolk. He had never seen the sea and as he walked along the shore seaweeds and other marine organisms attracted his attention, and these he zealously collected. His duties during the next few years led him to remove successively to Sheringham, Hasboro (Happisburgh), Cromer, and Cley, all in Norfolk.

In the course of his rambles, he met the Rev. James Layton, curate at Catfield, who lent him books and assisted in laying the foundations of accurate knowledge. About the year 1830, he was transferred to Charmouth in Dorset, thence to Beer, and Paignton in Devon, and to Gorran Haven near Mevagissey in Cornwall.

Here he continued to pursue his zoological studies and supplied many specimens to George Johnston, who was preparing his History of the British Zoophytes (1838). It was in Gorran Haven that he started to study fossils and found fossils in some of the older rocks previously regarded as not fossil-bearing; the discovery of which proved the presence of Bala Beds (Ordovician or Lower Silurian) in the neighbourhood of Gorran Haven.

In 1841, he read a paper before the British Association at Plymouth On the Fossil Organic Remains found on the south-east coast of Cornwall, and in 1843 he brought before the Royal Geological Society of Cornwall an account of his discovery of fish remains in the Devonian slates near Polperro. Peach was transferred for a time to Fowey, where he nursed Alfred Lord Tennyson who had fallen on the moors. Tennyson became a firm friend, Peach gets a mention in Tennyson's poem "Maud", (Peach's daughter). Posted in 1849 to Scotland, he went first to Peterhead in 1849 where he befriended fellow customs officer and geologist, David Grieve, and went from there to Wick (1853), where he made acquaintance with Robert Dick of Thurso. During his stay in Peterhead, where he was Comptroller of Customs, he met with Hugh Miller and collected "Buchan Flints". He collected fishes from the Old Red Sandstone; and during a sojourn at Durness he first found fossils in the Cambrian limestone (1854). Peach was honoured with medals from the Royal Cornwall Polytechnic Society.

Mrs Peach was presented a specially printed book, (from Queen Victoria by the Prince Consort.

He supplied Charles Darwin with cirripede (barnacle) specimens collected on the Cornish coast, and the hulls of oceangoing ships in dry-dock (which it was his duty, as a Customs Officer, to license); thus barnacles from all over the world, these formed the earliest calibration point for Darwin's work on the origin of species. Peach was moved to Peterhead in Scotland and thence to Wick in the rank of Comptroller of Customs. Here he also acted as Consul for Norway.

=== Personal life ===
Peach married and was the father of seven children. He retired from the government service in 1861 due to a customs treaty with France requiring a reduction of officers. He moved to Edinburgh in May 1865 whereupon he commenced a new field of research and study into the plant fossils of the Carboniferous rocks of the area. 1870-1874 President RGS Edinburgh. He died at Edinburgh on 28 February 1886.

One of his sons was the geologist Benjamin Neeve Peach, ASRM, LL.D etc. Director the Royal Geological Survey Scotland. BNP's geological map is still used in universities around the world. it was Ben Peach that discovered how older rocks could be found above younger rocks.

== Sources ==
- Bonney, Thomas George (1895). "Peach, Charles William" . In Lee, Sidney (ed.). Dictionary of National Biography. Vol. 44. London: Smith, Elder & Co.
- Oldroyd, David. "Peach, Charles William (1800–1886)". Oxford Dictionary of National Biography (online ed.). Oxford University Press. doi:10.1093/ref:odnb/21665. (Subscription, Wikipedia Library access or UK public library membership required.)
