= Trevarrick =

Trevarrick (Cornish: Trevardhek) is a hamlet in the parish of St Goran in Cornwall, England, United Kingdom.

Trevarrick lies within the Cornwall Area of Outstanding Natural Beauty (AONB). Almost a third of Cornwall has AONB designation, with the same status and protection as a National Park.
