= Farmtown =

Coordinates: 57°32′55″N 02°49′23″W

Farmtown (Farmton on Ordnance Survey maps) is a village in the Moray council area of Scotland.

Farmtown lies on the junction of the A95 and B9117 roads east of the town of Keith.
