= The Gwineas =

Group of rocks off the coast of Cornwall

The Gwinges / Gull Rock
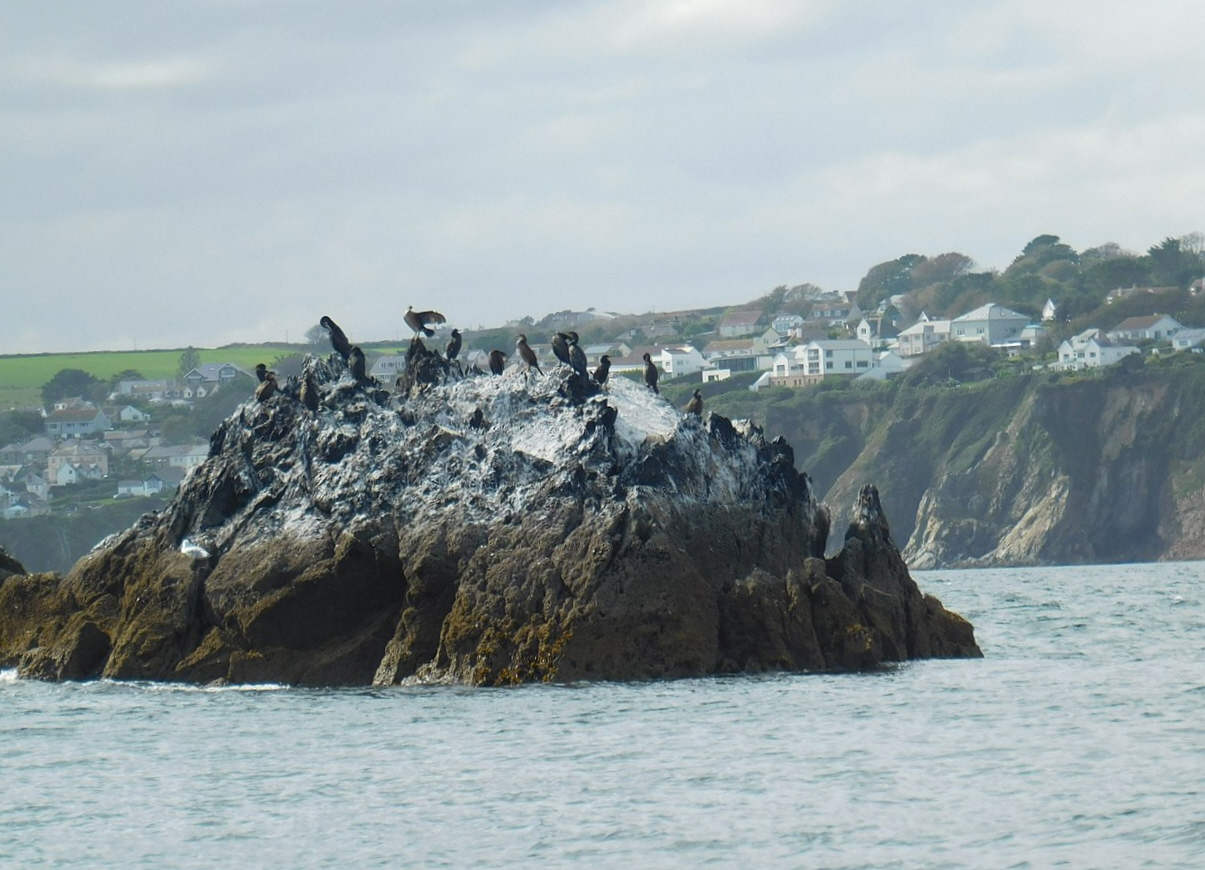

- Map showing location of The Gwineas

Geography
- Location: Off Gorran Haven, Cornwall, England
- Coordinates: 50°14′43″N 4°45′43″W
- Type: Rock protruding above the water's surface.
- Area: 0.01 km^{2} (0.0039 sq mi)
- Highest elevation: 2 m (7 ft)

Administration
- United Kingdom

Demographics
- Population: 0 (2021)

The Gwineas, also known as The Gwinges, are a set of approximately fifteen rocks in the extreme southern English Channel, off the coast of the fishing village of Gorran Haven, Cornwall, on the south-west coast of Great Britain, remarkable for its seals, dolphins, gannets, and cormorants. There is not too much known about the Gwineas.

== History ==
The Gwineas are believed to have been a hill surrounded by a forest. Over time this became an islet and then, eventually, an isolated rock as it is today.

== Shipwrecks ==
While the visible Gwineas has been the site of several shipwrecks, the Yaw, a submerged rock to the east, has been the cause of more wrecks. Although the bell buoy is called 'Gwineas', it is there to mark the Yaw. As an eastern cardinal buoy, it flashes in groups of three, indicating that it is located to the east of the hazard. It is kept in place with four large anchors attached to chains, the flashing light is solar-powered, and it is serviced at least once a year.

=== SS Ardangorm ===
On Thursday 4 January 1940, the SS Ardangorm, a 5,000-ton vessel, struck the Gwineas in an ESE gale at night when en route from Cardiff to Fowey in ballast.

The Fowey lifeboat launched at 3.45am thirty five minutes after distress flares were seen. At daylight 11 crew were rescued by the lifeboat. This left 25 crew aboard. The lifeboat landed the 11 and requested assistance from tugs. In the afternoon, after an Admiralty tug had arrived, it was decided the ship could not be saved. The lifeboat took off the remaining crew and returned to Fowey at 4.18pm. The ship's back broke on 10 January and wood and other material washed ashore to be salvaged by villagers.

=== Pallas ===
On the 7th April 1895 the mainly steel-built Russian barque 'Pallas' was wrecked on Great Perhaver Beach after grounding on The Gwineas in an easterly gale. The vessel's cargo was timber, and all the crew were rescued. A large amount of steel wreckage once survived in the shallows.
