= Vault Beach =

Beach in Cornwall, England

Coordinates: 50.23194°N 4.79442°W

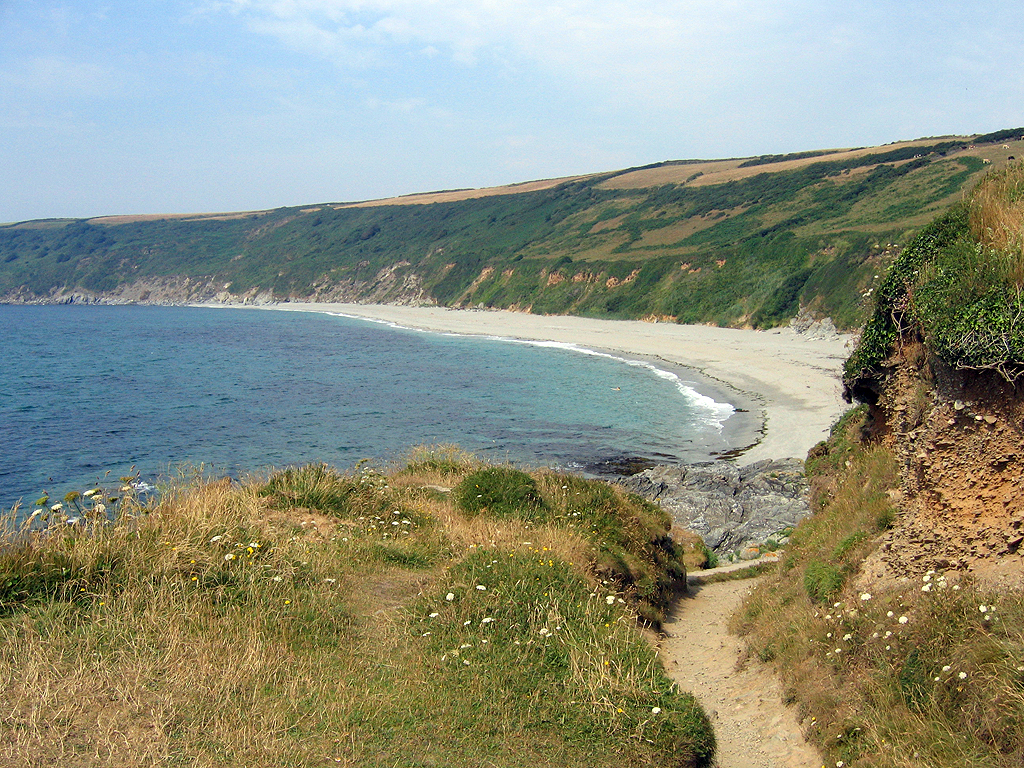
Vault Beach seen from the north

Vault Beach (or Bow Beach) is situated on the south coast of Cornwall, England, UK, near Gorran Haven. The beach consists mainly of shingle but does have some sand at low tide. Vault Beach faces southeast onto the English Channel and lies between Cadythew Rocks in the north and Dodman Point at the southern end.

Car parking is available in Gorran Haven and Lamledra which are both some distance from the beach. Toilet facilities are available at Gorran Haven. The southern end of the beach tends to attract naturists.

Vault beach was named Vault as during the wind powered days of sail should a ship or boat mess up its navigation and flounder upon the Dodman (Deadman) the bodies would normally wash up on this stretch of beach. The Dodman was quite easy to mistake with Lands End and with the wrong winds could end up with disastrous consequences.
