= Gorddinog =

Coordinates: 53.243216°N 3.989356°W

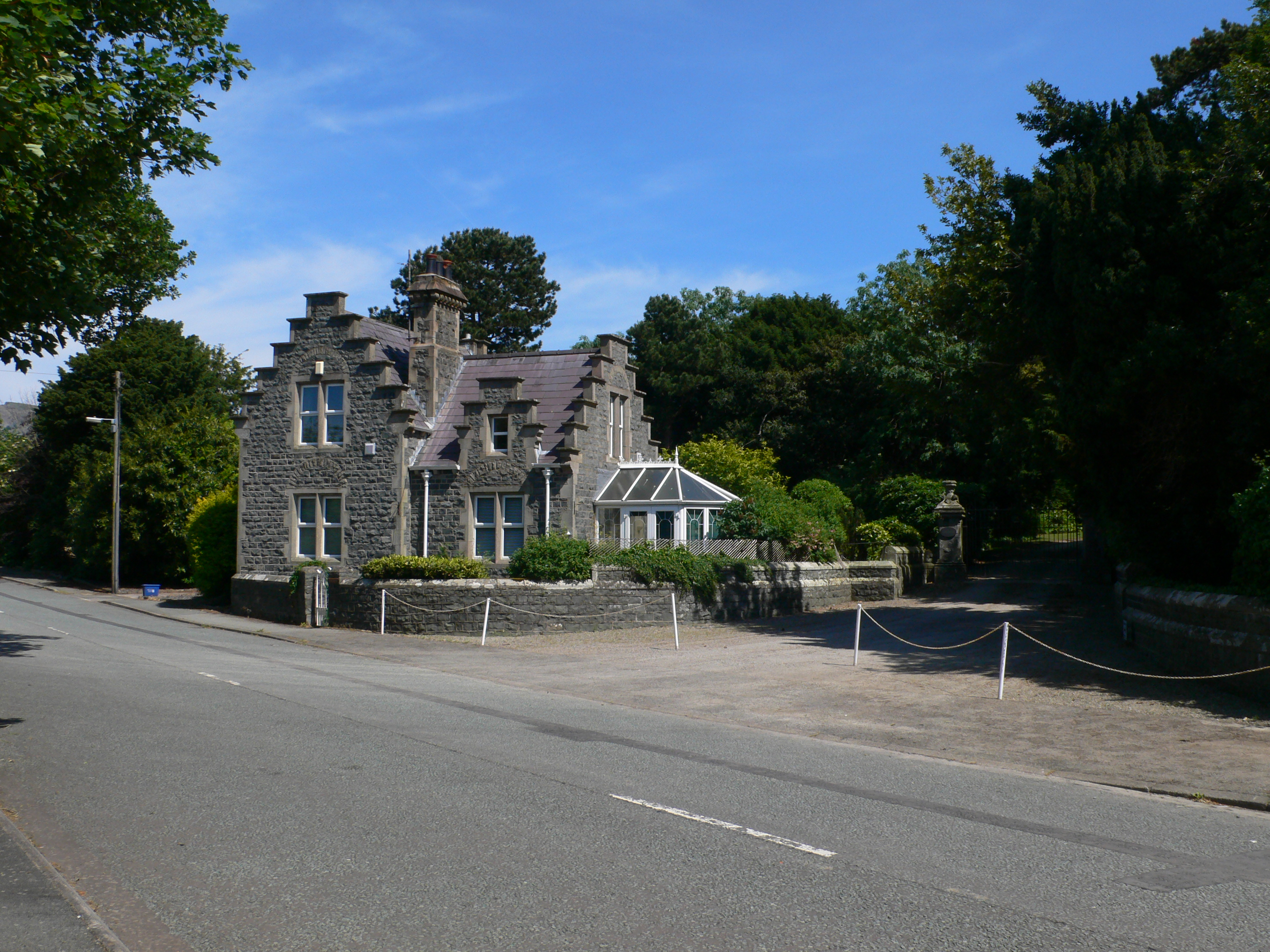

- Location within Conwy
- Community: Llanfairfechan
- Principal area: Conwy
- Country: Wales
- Sovereign state: United Kingdom
- Post town: LLANFAIRFECHAN
- Postcode district: LL33
- Police: North Wales
- Fire: North Wales
- Ambulance: Welsh
- UK Parliament: Ynys Môn
- Senedd Cymru – Welsh Parliament: Bangor Aberconwy

Gorddinog is a hamlet and former estate within the community of Llanfairfechan in Conwy County Borough, North West Wales. It is located at the county boundaries between Conwy and Gwynedd.

The hanlet is located directly to the south of Llanfairfechan town centre. The Menai Strait lies directly across from the hamlet, separated by the A55 road (North Wales Expressway) between Holyhead and Chester.

== History ==
The hamlet was once a part of the Gorddinog Estate, and was under Arllechwedd Uchaf. Where it was a township, alongside Bodsilin, Dwygyfylchi and Llanfair. These were all originally part of the historic county of Caernarfonshire.

However, since 1996 these villages and the town of Llanfair (now Llanfairfechan), are now split between the present day counties of Conwy County Borough and Gwynedd.

== Present day ==
Today, the hamlet remains mostly quiet with the majority of traffic using now using the A55 Expressway. However, local residents and visitors can reach the nearby town of Llanfairfechan. Using the older roads such as Gwylit Road and Aber Road.

== See also ==
- List of localities in Wales by population
