= Gollawater =

Coordinates: 50.3133°N 5.157°W

- Location within Cornwall
- OS grid reference: SW753507
- Civil parish: Perranzabuloe
- Unitary authority: Cornwall
- Ceremonial county: Cornwall
- Region: South West
- Country: England
- Sovereign state: United Kingdom
- Post town: Truro
- Postcode district: TR4

Gollawater is a hamlet in the parish of Perranzabuloe, Cornwall, England.
