= Ben Peach =

British geologist (1842–1926)

Ben Peach FRS FRSE FGS
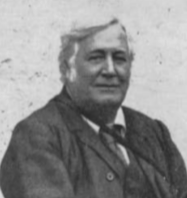
- Born: 6 September 1842; Gorran Haven, Cornwall, UK
- Died: 29 January 1926 (aged 83)
- Education: Royal School of Mines
- Father: Charles William Peach
- Awards: Wollaston Medal
- Scientific career
- Fields: geology

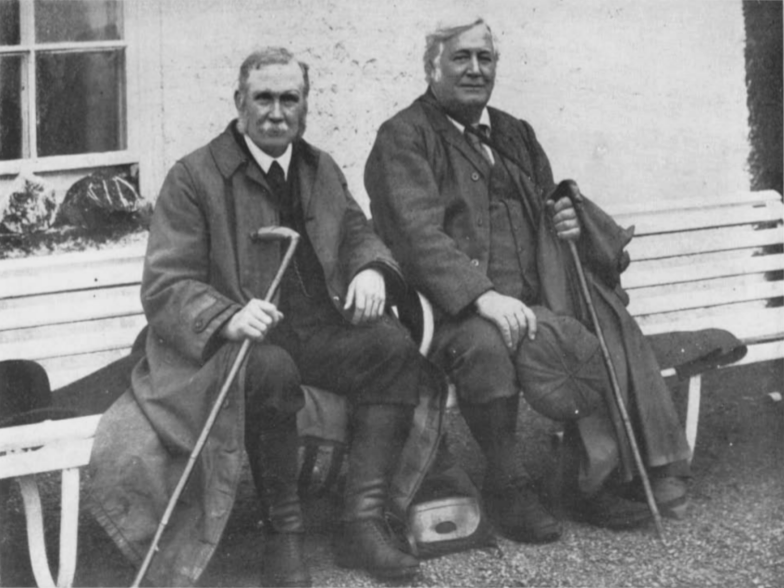
Ben Peach (right) and John Horne outside the Inchnadamph Hotel, 1912

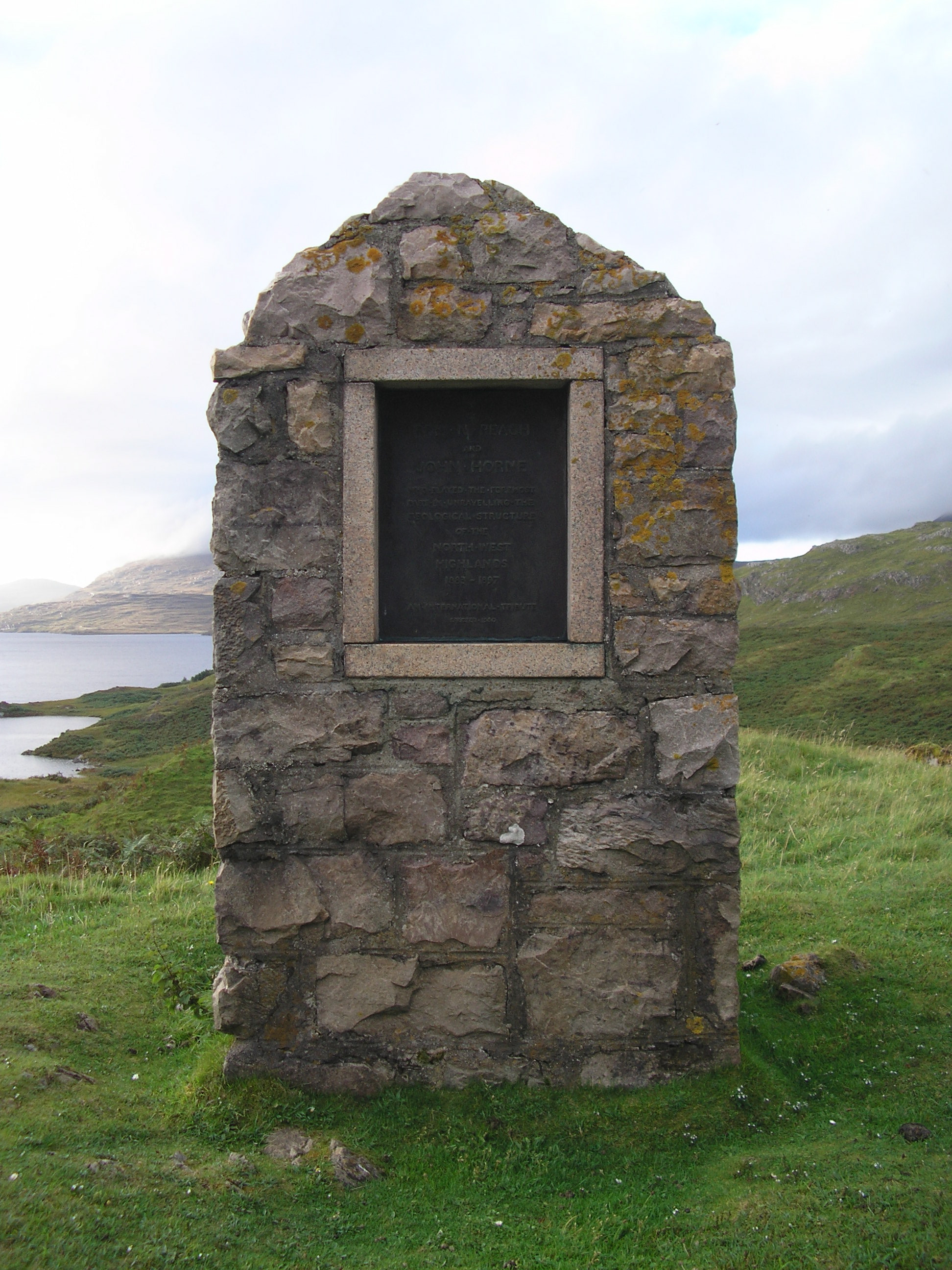
Peach and Horne monument

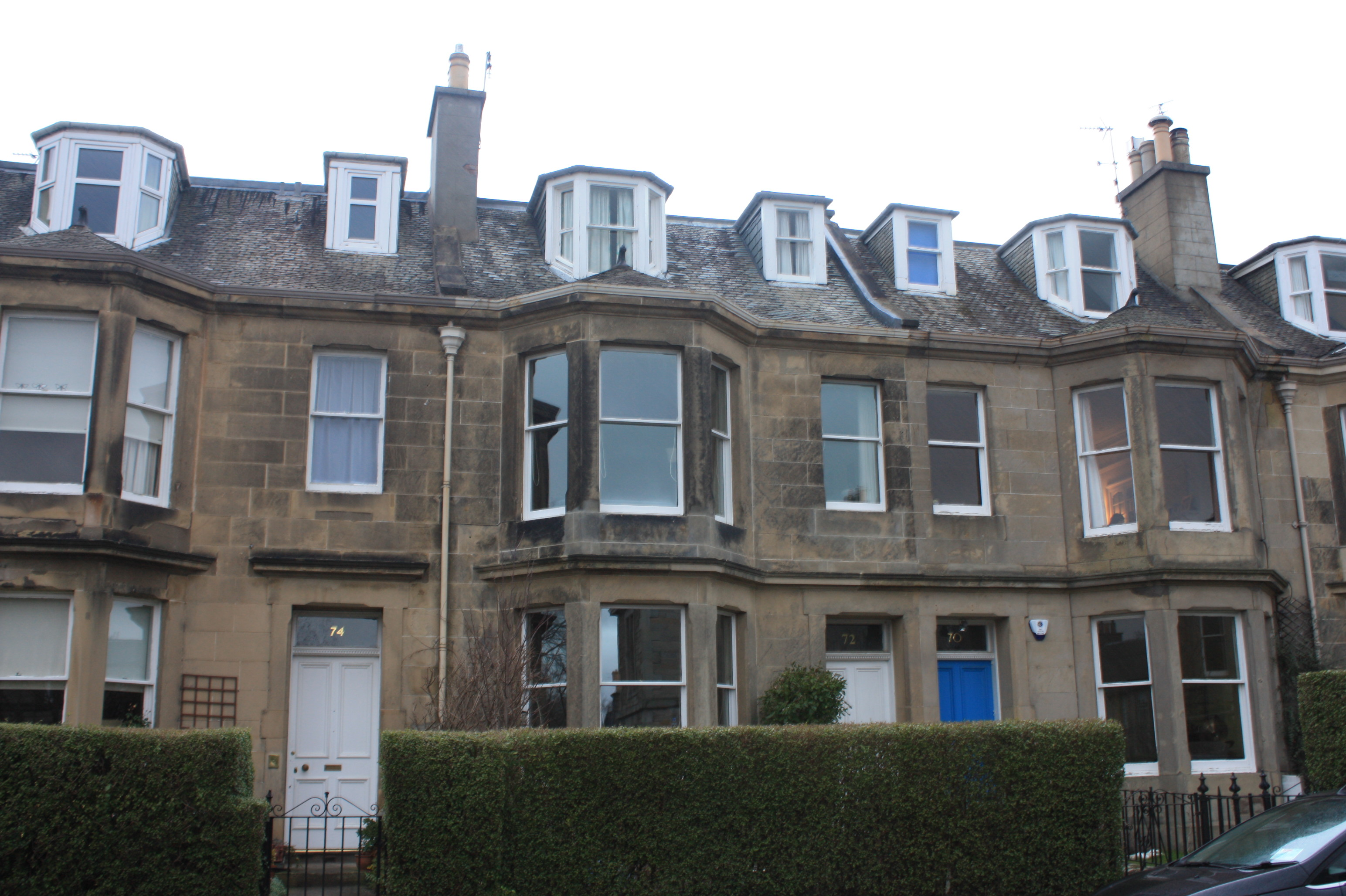
Peach's modest mid-terraced villa at 72 Grange Loan, Edinburgh

Benjamin Neeve Peach (6 September 1842 – 29 January 1926) was a British geologist. He is best remembered for his work on the Northwest Highlands and Southern Uplands with John Horne, by which they resolved the long-running "Highlands Controversy" with the 1907 publication The Geological Structure of the North-West Highlands of Scotland.

== Life ==
Peach was born at Gorran Haven in Cornwall on 6 September 1842 to Jemima Mabson and Charles William Peach, an amateur British naturalist and geologist. He was educated at the Royal School of Mines in London and then joined the Geological Survey in 1862 as a geologist, moving to the Scottish branch in 1867. H

In 1881 he was elected a Fellow of the Royal Society of Edinburgh. His proposers were Archibald Geikie, Sir Charles Wyville Thomson, Peter Guthrie Tait and Robert Gray. He won the Society's Neill Prize for the period 1883–86. He served as the Society's Vice President from 1912 to 1917.

He was elected a Fellow of the Royal Society in 1892. The citation on his candidacy form read: "District Surveyor of the Geological Survey of Scotland. Past President of the Physical Society of Edinburgh. Recipient of the Wollaston Donation Fund of the Geological Society in 1887. For thirty years actively engaged on the Geological survey, during which time he has mapped many of the most complicated districts of Scotland. Has charge of the surveying of the NW Highlands, and has taken the leading part in unravelling the remarkable structural complications of that region. Author of various papers on palaeontological subjects: – 'On some New Crustaceans from the Lower Carboniferous Rocks of Eskale and Liddesdale' (Trans Roy Soc Edin, vol xxx, p. 73); 'On some new species of Fossil Scorpions from the Carboniferous Rocks of Scotland' (ibid, p 399); 'Further Researches among the Crustacea and Arachnida of the Carboniferous Rocks of the Scottish Border' (ibid, p 511); 'On some Fossil Myriapods from the Lower Old Red Sandstone of Forfarshire (Proc Roy Phys Soc Edin, vol vii, p 179). Joint author with Mr J Horne of many papers on stratigraphical and physical geology, including : – 'The Glaciation of the Shetland Isles' (Quart Journ Geol Soc, vol xxxv, p 778); 'The Glaciation of the Orkney Islands' (ibid, vol xxxvi, p 648); 'The Old Red Sandstone of Shetland' (Proc Roy Phys Soc Edin, vol v, p 30); 'The Glaciation of Caithness (ibid, vol vi, p 316); 'Report on the Geology of the North-West of Sutherland' (Nature, vol xxxi, p 31); 'The Old Red Sandstone Volcanic Rocks of Shetland' (Trans Roy Soc Edin, vol xxxii, p 539); 'Report on the Recent Work of the Geological Survey in the North-West Highlands of Scotland, based on the Field Maps of B N Peach, J Horne, W Gunn, C T Clough, L Hinxman, and H M Cadell' (Quart Journ Geol Soc, vol xliv, p. 378). "

He was awarded the honorary degree Doctor of Laws (LL.D.) from the University of Edinburgh in 1903.

In 1905 he succeeded Ramsay Heatley Traquair as President of the Geological Society of Glasgow. He was succeeded in time in 1908 by John Walter Gregory.

He was awarded the Wollaston Medal of the Geological Society in 1921.

A monument to the work of Peach and Horne was erected at Inchnadamph, close to the Moine Thrust where they did some of their best-known work. The inscription reads: "To Ben N Peach and John Horne who played the foremost part in unravelling the geological structure of the North West Highlands 1883–1897. An international tribute. Erected 1930.".

Peach was twice married. His first wife was Jeanie Bannatyne with whom he had four daughters and two sons. He then married Margaret Anne MacEwen, with whom he had two sons. His later home was at 72 Grange Loan in Edinburgh.

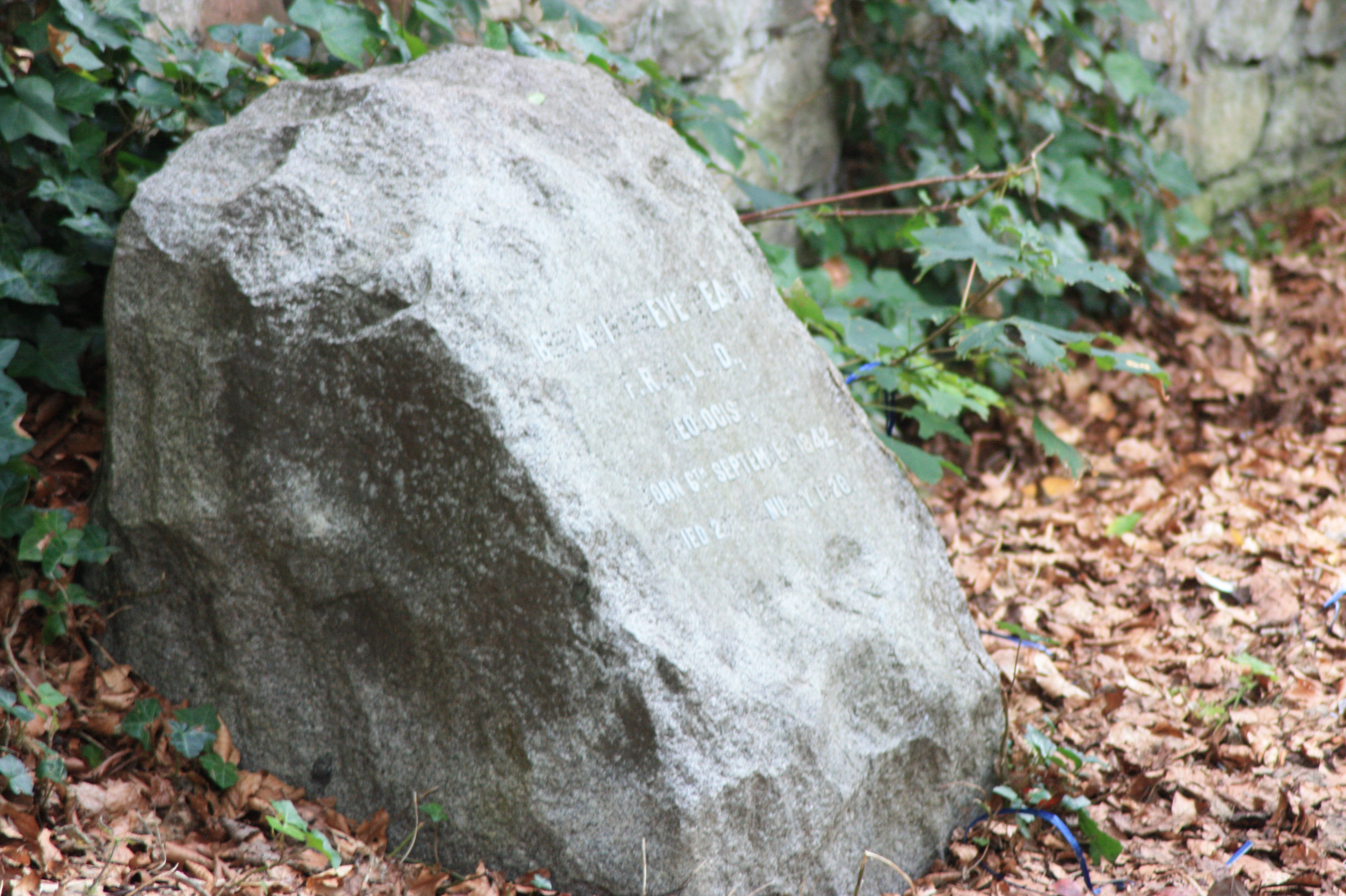
The grave of Ben Peach, Morningside Cemetery

He died of a cerebral thrombosis at his niece's house at 33 Comiston Drive on 29 January 1926. He is buried in Morningside Cemetery, Edinburgh. The grave lies in the fenced western section, and is inaccessible without prior arrangement.

== Notable persons working with Peach ==
Peach's survey team included several notable geologists including: Charles Barrois, William Savage Boulton, Charles Hawker Dinham, Thomas John Jehu, Aubrey Strahan, Sidney Hugh Reynolds and James Ernest Richey.

== See also ==
- Knockan Crag
- Inchnadamph
- North West Highlands Geopark
- Geology of Scotland
- Ordnance Gazetteer of Scotland: A Graphic and Accurate Description of Every Place in Scotland (Peach co-contributed its section on geology)
