= Goonabarn =

Coordinates: 50.357°N 4.873°W

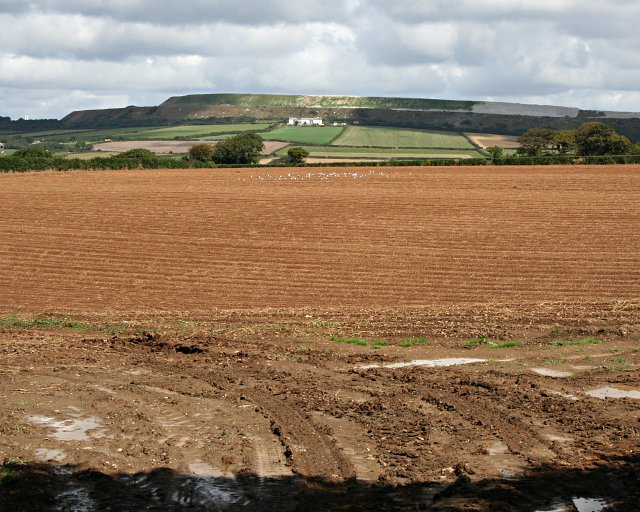
- A ploughed field near Goonabarn

- Location within Cornwall
- OS grid reference: SW957547
- Civil parish: St Stephen-in-Brannel
- Unitary authority: Cornwall
- Ceremonial county: Cornwall
- Region: South West
- Country: England
- Sovereign state: United Kingdom
- Post town: St Austell
- Postcode district: PL26

Goonabarn is a hamlet in the parish of St Stephen-in-Brannel, Cornwall, England.
