= Gore End =

Hamlet in Hampshire, England

Coordinates: 51.369835°N 1.39956°W

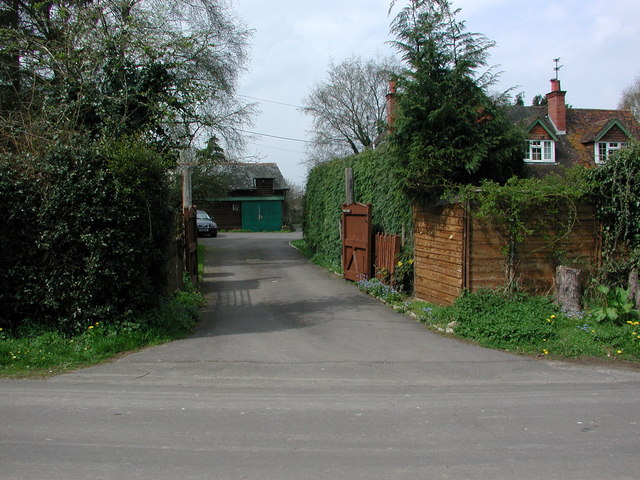
- Cottage in Gore End

- Location within Hampshire
- OS grid reference: SU4189463590
- Civil parish: East Woodhay
- District: Basingstoke and Deane
- Shire county: Hampshire
- Region: South East
- Country: England
- Sovereign state: United Kingdom
- Post town: NEWBURY
- Postcode district: RG20
- Dialling code: 01264
- Police: Hampshire and Isle of Wight
- Fire: Hampshire and Isle of Wight
- Ambulance: South Central
- UK Parliament: North West Hampshire

Gore End is a hamlet in the Basingstoke and Deane district of Hampshire, England. It is in the civil parish of East Woodhay. The hamlet is situated in the North Wessex Downs Area of Outstanding Natural Beauty on the Hampshire-Berkshire border. Its nearest town is Newbury, which lies approximately 4.2 miles (6.8 km) north-east from the village.
