= Goonhusband =

Hamlet in Cornwall, England

Coordinates: 50.081°N 5.271°W

- Location within Cornwall
- OS grid reference: SW661252
- Civil parish: Helston
- Unitary authority: Cornwall
- Ceremonial county: Cornwall
- Region: South West
- Country: England
- Sovereign state: United Kingdom
- Post town: Helston
- Postcode district: TR12

Goonhusband is a hamlet in the parish of Helston, Cornwall, England.
