= Gorran Churchtown =

Coordinates: 50.246°N 4.809°W

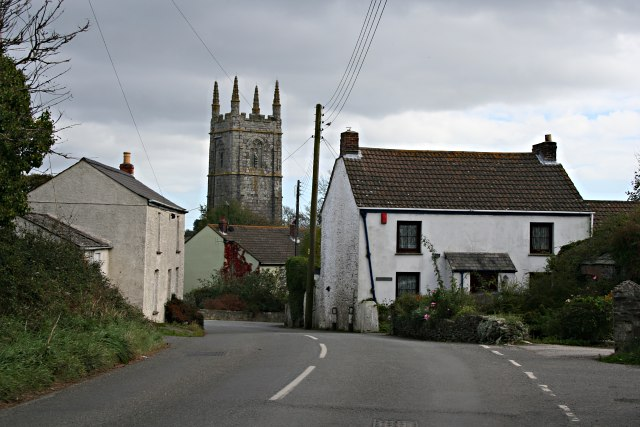
- Gorran Churchtown with tower of St Goran's church in the background

- Location within Cornwall
- OS grid reference: SW998422
- Civil parish: St Goran
- Unitary authority: Cornwall
- Ceremonial county: Cornwall
- Region: South West
- Country: England
- Sovereign state: United Kingdom
- Post town: St Austell
- Postcode district: PL26

Gorran Churchtown is a village in the parish of St Goran (where the 2011 census population was included ), Cornwall, England. Gorran Churchtown is situated approximately nine miles (14 km) south-southwest of St Austell; Gorran Haven, the largest settlement in the parish, is a mile to the east.

Gorran Churchtown lies within the Cornwall Area of Outstanding Natural Beauty (AONB).

== St Goran Church ==
The Church of St Goran is part of a wider benefice involving St Just (Gorran Haven) and St Michael Caerhays. All three are part of the Diocese of Truro.

=== Refurbishment of the Bell Tower ===
Prior to 2015, the Church's bell tower had a ring of 6 bells. After fundraising effort and receipt of a grant from the Heritage Lottery Fund, St Goran were able to preserve their existing Georgian bells in a traditional wooden frame while installing a refurbished set of 8 Victorian bells from the former church of St Mary the Virgin in Chatham, Kent.

Of the pre-2015 ring of bells, two modern castings were removed - leaving four Pennington bells cast in 1772 in situ. The Taylor 5th bell is now the tenor of the augmentation from three to six at Ab Kettleby, Leicestershire. The Gillett & Johnston 2nd is to become the tenor of a ring of ten bells at Vernet les Bains, France.

=== Renovations to the Interior ===
Since 2011, the Church has undergone numerous significant changes to the interior in an attempt to make the church more accessible for its parishioners and more effective as a community space.

This began in 2011 with replacing the Lady Chapel's pews with chairs and improving the hand rail. A year later, the Norman font (dating from around 1180) was moved from the back of the church to the Lady Chapel in order to make room for more renovation at the back.

In 2014, Fundraising efforts began in earnest to create a community space separate from the main body of the church. Building was completed in 2016 and now includes small and large meeting spaces, a kitchen, a gallery area and course facilities for visiting bell ringers. The new space was opened by the Bishop of Truro (then Tim Thornton) on 9 September 2016.
