= Goonown =

Coordinates: 50.306°N 5.199°W

Goonown: Cornish: Goonown
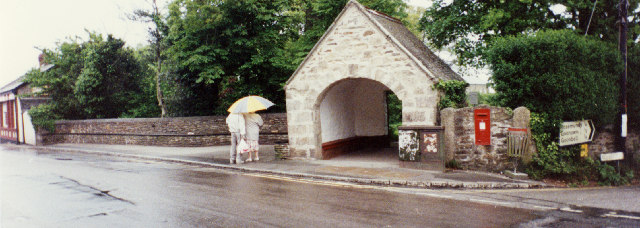
- Garden of Rest southwest gate, St Agnes

- Location within Cornwall
- OS grid reference: SW723500
- Unitary authority: Cornwall
- Ceremonial county: Cornwall
- Region: South West
- Country: England
- Sovereign state: United Kingdom
- Post town: St Agnes
- Postcode district: TR5

Goonown (Cornish: Goonown, meaning moorland of fear) is a hamlet near St Agnes in Cornwall, England, UK. There is a Methodist chapel and a 19th-century graveyard in Goonown.
