= Gonamena =

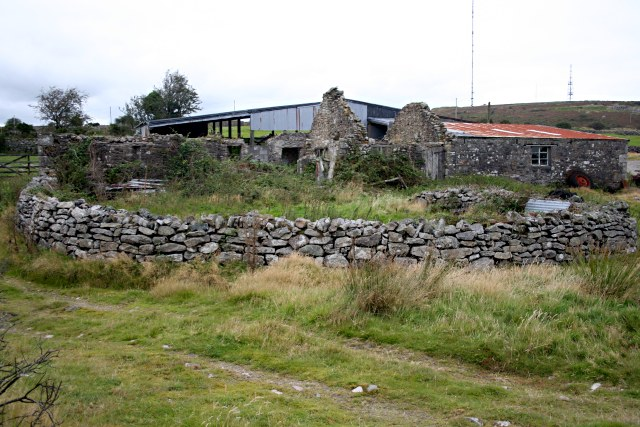
- Farm buildings near Gonamena

- Location in Cornwall
- Location: Minions, Cornwall, England
- Products: Tin, Chalcopyrite and Cuprite

Gonamena is a site of disused mines in Cornwall, England. It is half a mile south of Minions.

== See also ==
- Mining in Cornwall and Devon – Mining in the English counties
