= Goon Gumpas =

Village in Cornwall, England

Coordinates: 50.23875°N 5.16787°W

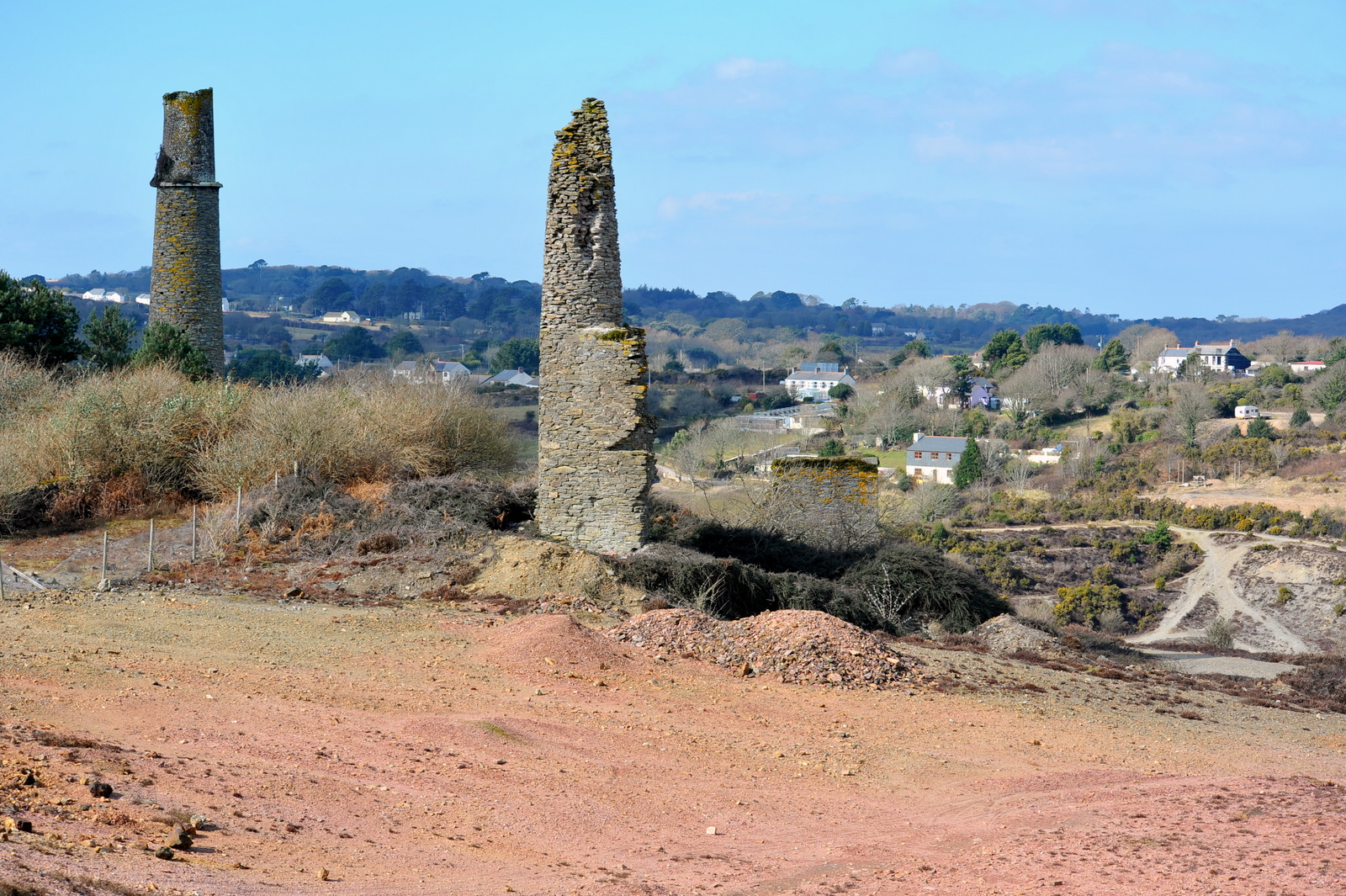
Part of Goon Gumpas (in the mid-distance on the right) as seen from Wheal Maid

Goon Gumpas is a hill and a small settlement in west Cornwall, England, UK. It is two miles (3 km) east of Redruth in a former mining area at grid reference SW 747 427. Just to the south is the mining sett of the former Wheal Maid. It is in the civil parish of Gwennap. Aphex Twin, a Cornwall native, named a track from his Richard D. James Album after Goon Gumpas.
