= Gorsley =

Village in Gloucestershire, England

Coordinates: 51.92979°N 2.46680°W

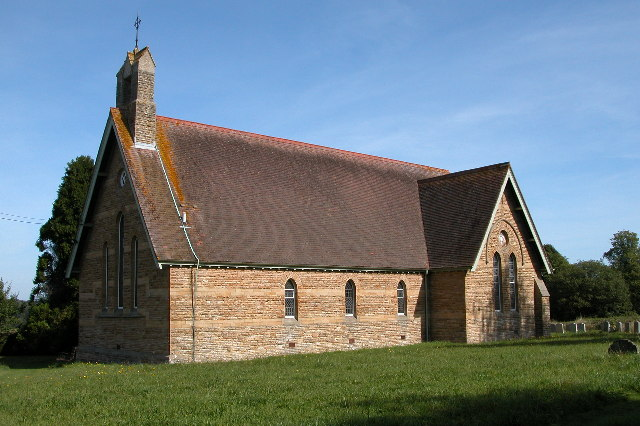
- Christ Church, Gorsley

- Location within Gloucestershire
- Civil parish: Gorsley and Kilcot
- District: Forest of Dean
- Shire county: Gloucestershire
- Region: South West
- Country: England
- Sovereign state: United Kingdom
- Post town: ROSS-ON-WYE
- Postcode district: HR9
- Dialling code: 01989
- Police: Gloucestershire
- Fire: Gloucestershire
- Ambulance: South Western
- UK Parliament: Forest of Dean

Gorsley is a small village in the Forest of Dean district of Gloucestershire, England, forming part of the civil parish of Gorsley and Kilcot. Nearby Gorsley Common and Little Gorsley are both in Herefordshire.

== Location and amenities ==
Gorsley is 4.7 km (2.9 mi) west of Newent, 10 km (6.2 mi) east of Ross-on-Wye and about 19 km (12 mi) south of Ledbury. The village is near junction 3 of the M50, one of the first motorways built in Britain in 1960. The slip roads on the junction end in right angled turns which often surprise motorists used to the more gradual, modern junction designs.

The Anglican church parish is combined with Cliffords Mesne. A stone Baptist chapel opened in 1852.

Gorsley limestone is named for the area. Stone from area quarries were used to build Victorian era buildings. Victorian maps show a number of quarries and lime kilns in the area.

The village pub is The Roadmaker, originally named The New Inn. It is owned and run by four ex-British Army Ghurka soldiers.

== Gallery ==
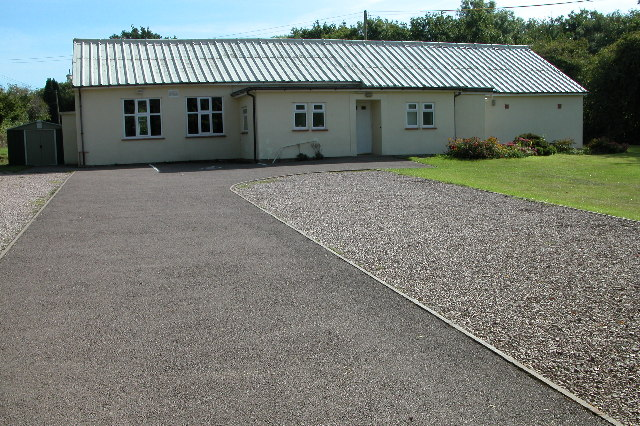
Gorsley Village Hall - September 2005

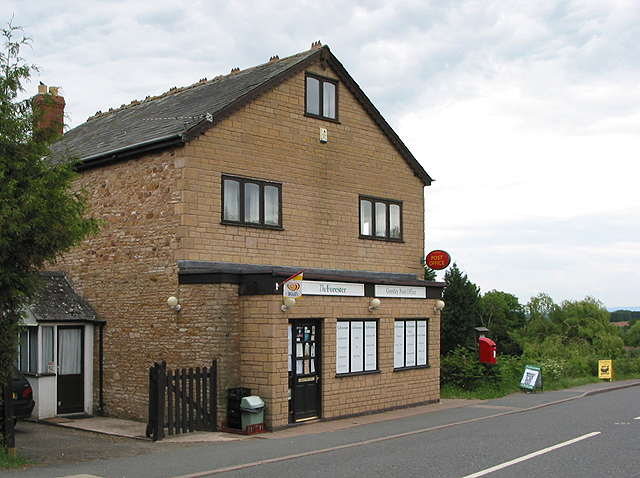
Gorsley Post Office

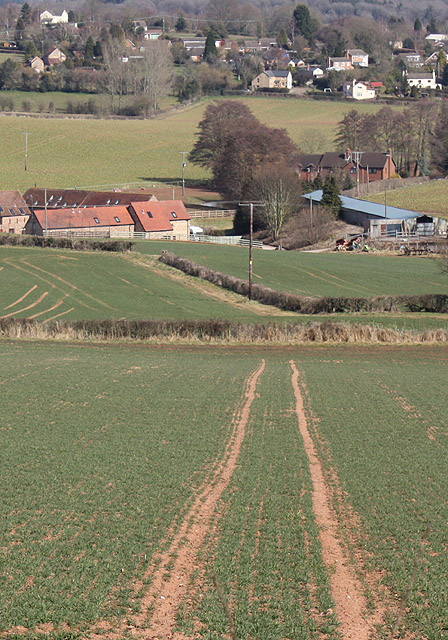
View to Gorsley Common

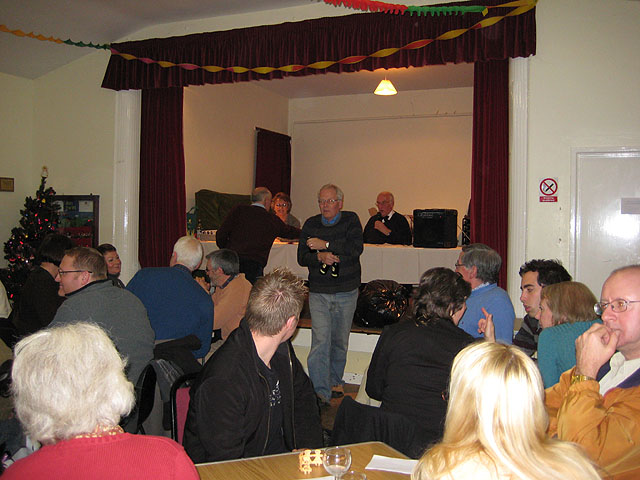
Quiz night in Gorsley Village Hall, 2008

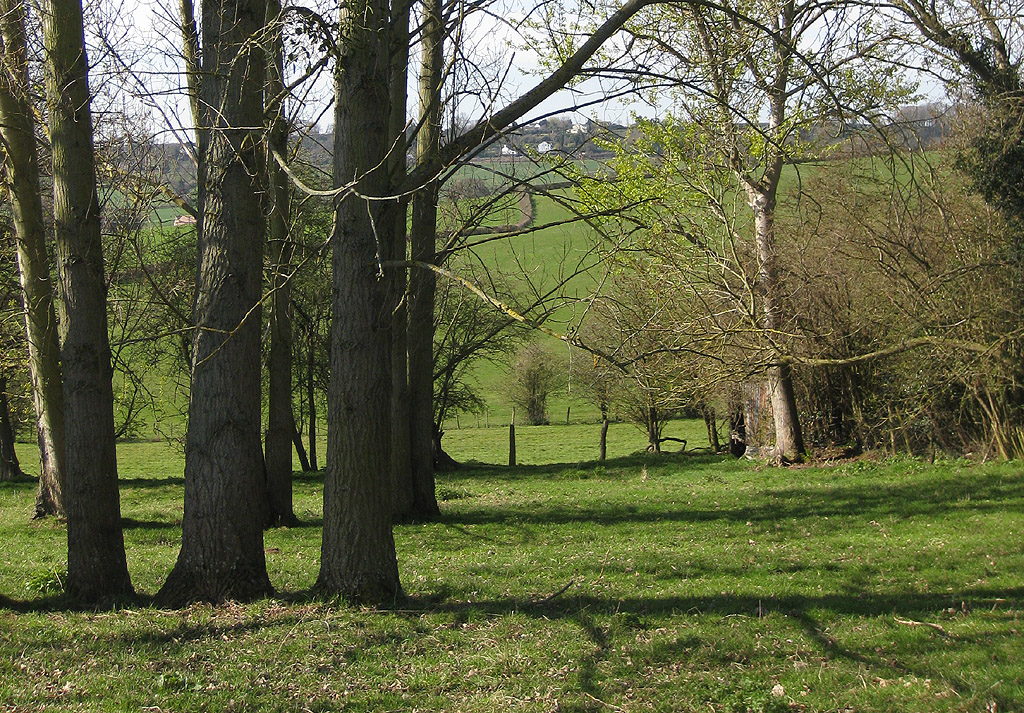
View to Linton ridge from Gorsley Common
