= Gorran High Lanes =

Coordinates: 50.252°N 4.824°W

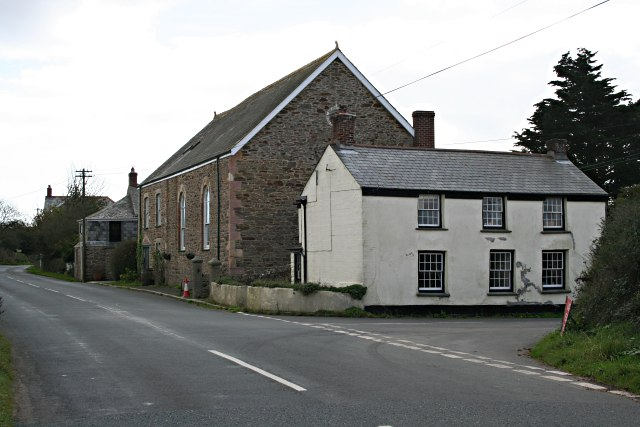
- Methodist chapel and house at Gorran High Lanes

- Location within Cornwall
- OS grid reference: SW988430
- Civil parish: St Goran
- Unitary authority: Cornwall
- Ceremonial county: Cornwall
- Region: South West
- Country: England
- Sovereign state: United Kingdom
- Post town: St Austell
- Postcode district: PL26

Gorran High Lanes, known locally as Gorran Highlanes, is a hamlet in the parish of St Goran in mid Cornwall, England.
