= Gorsley Common =

Village in Herefordshire, England

- Village
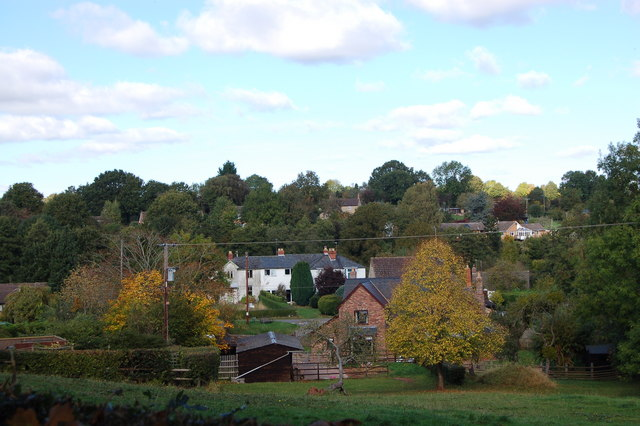

- Location within Herefordshire
- Coordinates: 51°55′47.78″N 2°28′28.2″W
- Country: England
- Region: West Midlands
- County: Herefordshire

Gorsley Common is a village in Herefordshire, west of Gorsley and Kilcot and east of Linton.
