= Gooseham Mill =

Hamlet in Cornwall, England

Coordinates: 50°55′46″N 4°30′43″W

Gooseham Mill is a hamlet in the parish of Morwenstow, Cornwall, England.

The hamlet lies below Gooseham hamlet, in the Marsland valley. The county border with Devon follows Marsland Water through the valley, thus a few of the hamlet's buildings on the north side of the stream are in Devon.
