= Goonlaze =

Coordinates: 50.1889°N 5.197°W

Goonlaze: Cornish: Goonlas
- Location within Cornwall
- OS grid reference: SW719370
- Civil parish: Stithians
- Unitary authority: Cornwall
- Ceremonial county: Cornwall
- Region: South West
- Country: England
- Sovereign state: United Kingdom
- Post town: Truro
- Postcode district: TR3

Goonlaze (Cornish: Goonlas, meaning green/blue/grey moorland) is a hamlet in the parish of Stithians, Cornwall, England.

It is also the name of a suburb on the east side of St Agnes, on the north coast of Cornwall.
