= Gorran Haven =

Coordinates: 50.241°N 4.793°W

Gorran Haven: Cornish: Porthust
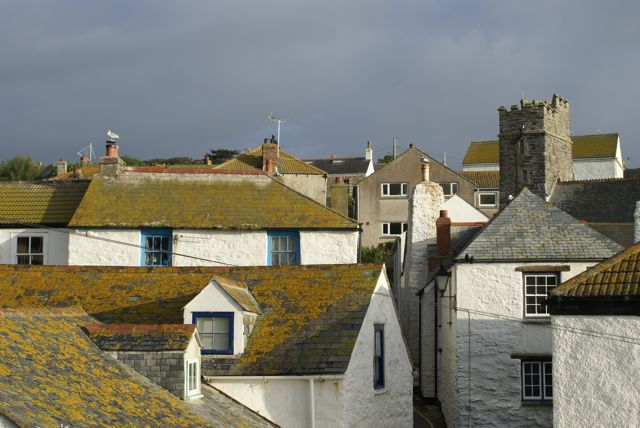
- Gorran Haven

- Location within Cornwall
- Population: 1,271 (Parish, 2001)
- OS grid reference: SX009414
- Civil parish: St Goran
- Unitary authority: Cornwall
- Ceremonial county: Cornwall
- Region: South West
- Country: England
- Sovereign state: United Kingdom
- Post town: ST. AUSTELL
- Postcode district: PL26
- Dialling code: 01726
- Police: Devon and Cornwall
- Fire: Cornwall
- Ambulance: South Western
- UK Parliament: St Austell and Newquay

Gorran Haven (Cornish: Porthust) is a fishing village, in the civil parish of St Goran, on the south coast of Cornwall, England, UK. It is about 2 miles (3.2 km) south of Mevagissey and lies within the Cornwall Area of Outstanding Natural Beauty (AONB).

== Overview ==
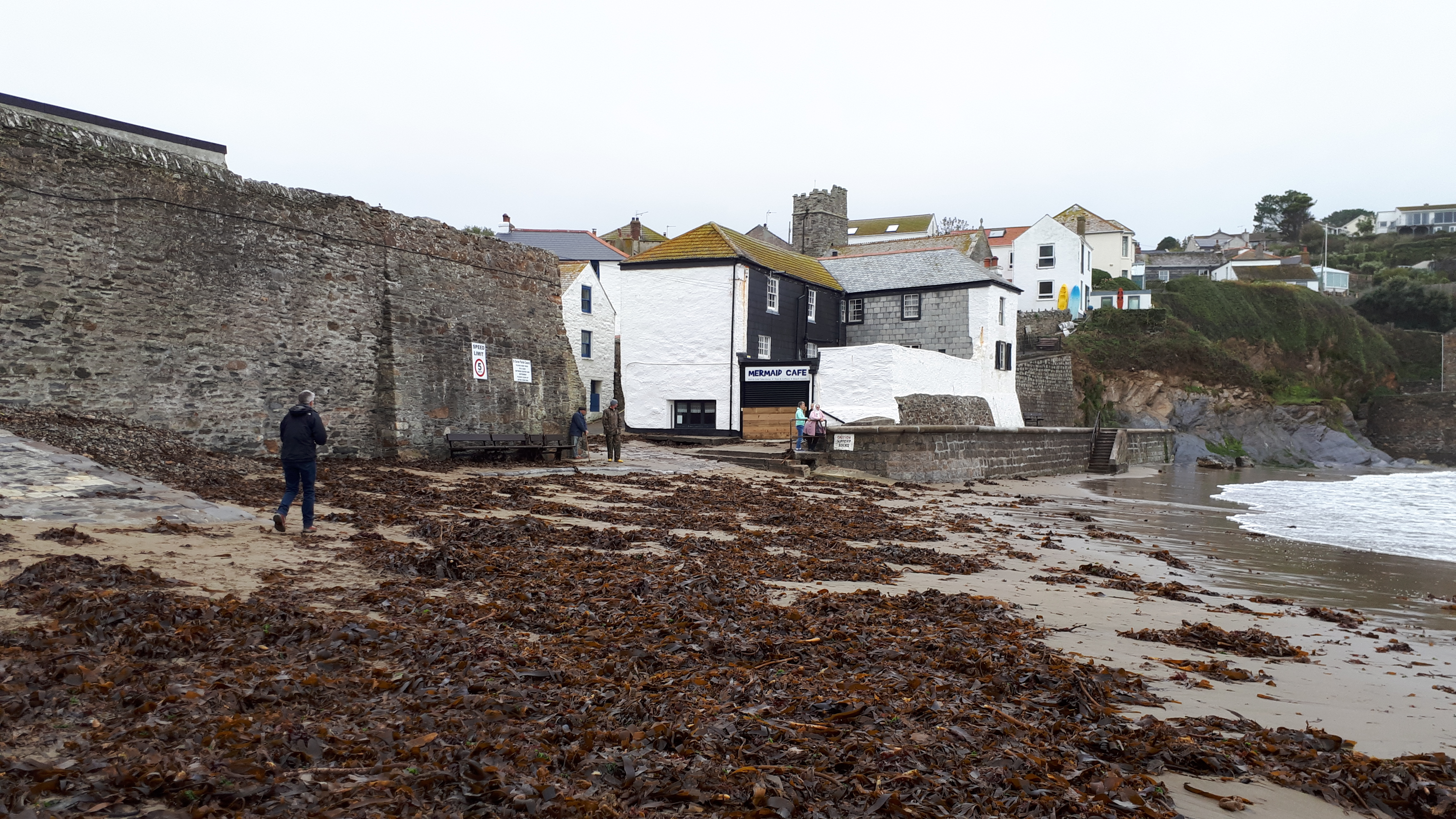
Gorran Haven seaweed

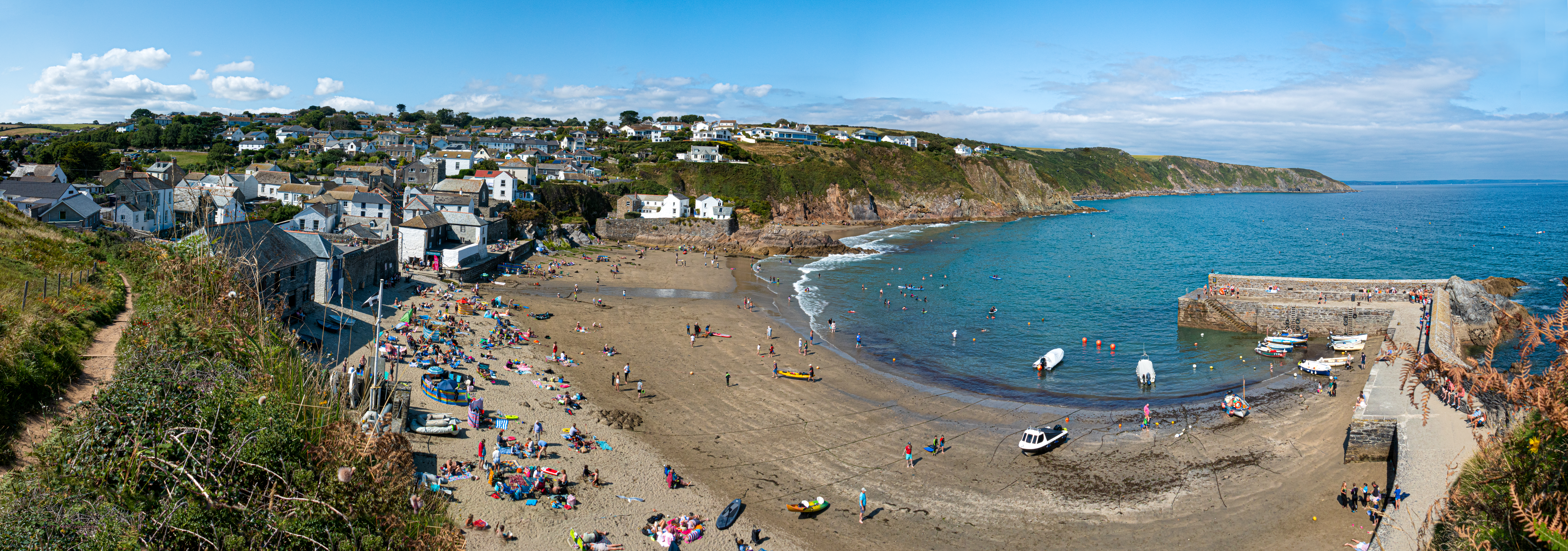
Gorran Haven, Cornwall at low tide on a summer afternoon.

The village lies in a cove between two sandy beaches. Vault Beach (also known as Bow beach) is south of Gorran Haven and Great Perhaver Beach is to the north, both beaches are naturist beaches.

Gorran Haven was an ancient fishing harbour; its first pier was built in the 15th century. In the 18th and 19th centuries it became a port handling merchandise brought from Fowey by barges and lighters. The pier was rebuilt in the 1820s and reconstructed in 1888. There are two churches in the village, Haven Church (previously Mount Zion), and St Just Church. St Just Church had been used as a fish cellar for over a century. In 1812 the Congregationalists of Mevagissey moved into the Haven using St Just as their Meeting House and referring to it as the old Chapel Cellar. Haven Church is a non-denominational church.

The Cinema Museum in London holds home movies of the village in the 1950s.

== Notable residents ==
- Sir Richard Dearlove (1945– ), civil servant, was born in and spent his early childhood in the village.
- Charles William Peach (1800–1886), naturalist and geologist, lived in the village and worked in the surrounding landscape, there is a plaque to his memory in the village.
- Ben Peach (1842–1926), son of Charles, geologist, was born in the village.
- Colin Wilson (1931–2013), author, lived in the village for over 50 years.

== See also ==
- Gorran Churchtown
- Gorran Highlanes
- St Goran
- The Gwineas
