= Gordonstown, Formartine =

Gordonstown: Scottish Gaelic: Baile Ghòrdain; Scots: Gordonstoun
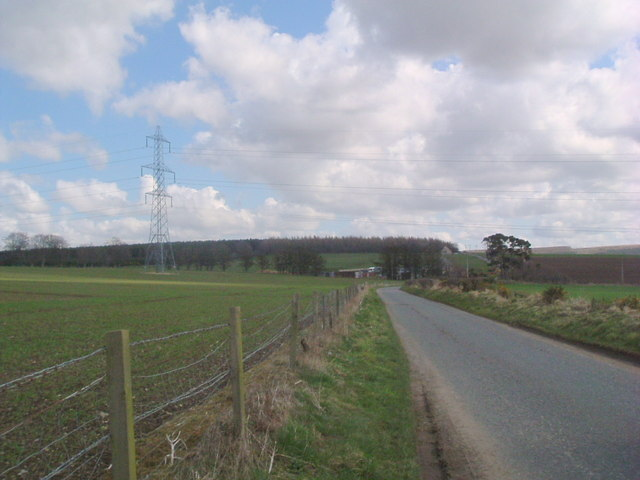
- Rural road near Gordonstown (Formartine)

- Location within Aberdeenshire
- OS grid reference: NJ715385
- Council area: Aberdeenshire
- Lieutenancy area: Aberdeenshire
- Country: Scotland
- Sovereign state: United Kingdom
- Post town: INVERURIE
- Postcode district: AB51
- Dialling code: 01651
- Police: Scotland
- Fire: Scottish
- Ambulance: Scottish

Gordonstown is a rural settlement in the Formartine area of Aberdeenshire, Scotland.

== Geography ==
Gordonstown lies along the road from Badenscoth to Fyvie, near to its junction with the B9001 road at Badenscoth.

== Education ==
The area is served by nearby primary schools at Auchterless and Rothienorman.

== Wind farm ==
Gordonstown Wind Farm, consisting of five turbines, came into operation in March 2013.
