= St Goran =

Civil parish in Cornwall, England

Coordinates: 50.244°N 4.812°W

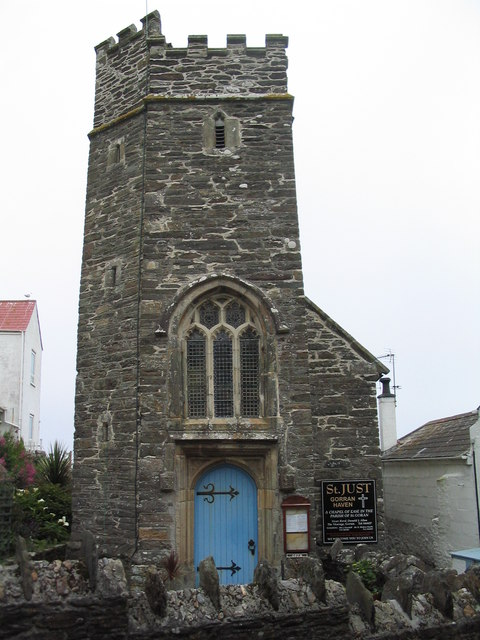
- Chapel of St Just, Gorran Haven

- Location within Cornwall
- Population: 1,243 (2021 census)
- Civil parish: St Goran
- Unitary authority: Cornwall
- Shire county: Cornwall
- Region: South West
- Country: England
- Sovereign state: United Kingdom
- Police: Devon and Cornwall
- Fire: Cornwall
- Ambulance: South Western

St Goran is a coastal civil parish in Cornwall, England, UK, six miles (10 km) south-southwest of St Austell. The largest settlement in the parish is the coastal village of Gorran Haven, a mile to the east with a further cluster of homes at Trevarrick. The population (including Boswinger) at the 2011 census was 1,411.

The parish is bounded by the sea to the east and south. It is bordered by St Michael Caerhays parish to the west and by St Ewe and Mevagissey parishes to the north.

The patron saint Guron or Goronus is said to have come here from Bodmin. The parish church is a fine building of the 15th century though the foundation is Norman. Features of interest include the bench ends and the late medieval font. At Gorran Haven is a 15th-century chapel of St Just, restored in the 1860s. At Bodrugan, there are some remains of the medieval manor house of the Bodrugans which also had a chapel.

Thomas Tonkin, MP and historian, is buried at the parish church.

== Cornish wrestling ==
William Nott from St Goran was a farmer who had much Cornish wrestling competition success at the end of the 1600s and was known as the "philosopher".

Charles Dawe from St Goran was referred to by Thomas Tonkin as being without equal in the early 1700s.
