= Gordonstown, Banff and Buchan =

Gordonstown
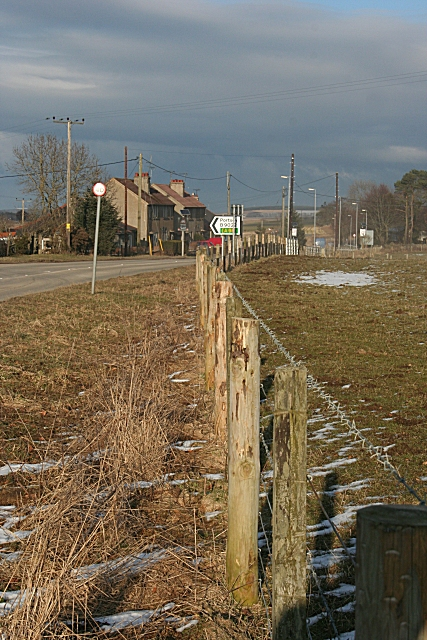
- Junction of the A95 and B9022 roads at Gordonstown (Banff and Buchan)

- Location within Aberdeenshire
- OS grid reference: NJ564565
- Council area: Aberdeenshire
- Country: Scotland
- Sovereign state: United Kingdom
- Post town: BANFF
- Postcode district: AB45
- Dialling code: 01466
- Police: Scotland
- Fire: Scottish
- Ambulance: Scottish
- UK Parliament: Aberdeenshire North and Moray East
- Scottish Parliament: Banffshire and Buchan Coast
- Website: aberdeenshire.gov.uk

Gordonstown is a rural settlement close to Cornhill in the Banff and Buchan area of Aberdeenshire, Scotland.

== Geography ==
Gordonstown is situated at the junction where the B9022 road to Portsoy leaves the A95 Keith to Banff road.

== Education ==
Ordiquhill School is a primary school located within the settlement and serving the surrounding area.
