= Máire Mulcahy =

Irish zoologist and ecologist

- Born: 1937; Cork, Ireland
- Died: 28 November 2023 (aged 85–86); Wilton, County Cork
- Occupations: zoologist; ecologist
- Years active: 1950s–2023
- Spouses: Edmund Noel Mulcahy (m. 1958–1968); Brian McCarthy (m. 1993; died 2011)
- Children: 1, 3 step-children

Máire F. Mulcahy (1937 – 28 November 2023) was an Irish zoologist and ecologist, with an expertise in fish and shellfish health and disease. She was the first female vice-president of an Irish University and the founding chair of the Marine Institute Ireland. She served as a vice-president of University College Cork (UCC).

The Mulcahy medal for the highest achieving zoology student in UCC is named in her honour.

== Background ==
Mulcahy attended St Angela's College and graduated from University College Cork (UCC) in 1958. She attained a doctorate in biochemistry from the University of Manchester.

She married Edmund (Noel) Mulcahy in 1958. Noel, a national chess master, died in the Aer Lingus Vickers Viscount crash in 1968.

== Career ==
Mulcahy was made a professor of Zoology at UCC. During her tenure she reinstated L. P. W. Renouf's natural history museum there. In 1989 she was made a vice-president of UCC. In 1990 she was appointed chair of the newly founded Marine Institute, having worked on its creation since the 1970s. Mulcahy was instrumental in the foundation of Science Foundation Ireland's Marine and Renewable Energy Ireland (MaREI) programme.

== Publications ==
- Davenport, John; Black, Kenneth D.; Burnell, Gavin; Cross, Tom; Culloty, Sarah; Ekaratne, Suki; Furness, Bob; Mulcahy, Maire; Thetmeyer, Helmut (2009). Aquaculture: The Ecological Issues. Germany: Wiley. ISBN 9781444311259.
- Culloty, S.C.; Mulcahy, M.F. (2007). "Bonamia ostreae: a review". Marine Environment and Health Series (29). Galway: Marine Institute.
- Culloty, S.C.; Cronin, M.A.; Mulcahy, M.F. (2003). "Possible limitations of diagnostic methods recommended for the detection of the protistan, Bonamia ostreae in the European flat oyster, Ostrea edulis". Bulletin of the European Association of Fish Pathologists (23): 67–71.
- Culloty, S.C.; Cronin, M.A.; Mulcahy, M.F. (2001). "An investigation into the relative resistance of Irish flat oysters Ostrea edulis L. to the parasite Bonamia ostreae (Pichot et al. 1980)". Aquaculture. 199 (199): 229–244. Bibcode:2001Aquac.199..229C. doi:10.1016/S0044-8486(01)00569-5.
- Culloty, S.C.; Novoa, B.; Pernas, M.; Longshaw, M.; Mulcahy, M.F.; Feist, S.W.; Figueras, A. (1999). "Susceptibility of a number of bivalve species to the protozoan parasite Bonamia ostreae and their ability to act as a vector for this parasite". Diseases of Aquatic Organisms. 37 (37): 73–80. Bibcode:1999DisAO..37...73C. doi:10.3354/dao037073. hdl:10261/26131.
- Mulcahy, M. F.; Kelly, T.C.; Holland, C. (1998). "Parasites and pathology of Irish freshwater animals". Studies in Irish Limnology. Dublin: Congress of Societas Internationalis Limnologiae.
- Culloty, S.C.; Mulcahy, M.F. (1996). "Season-, age-, and sex-related variations in the prevalence of bonamiasis in flat oyster (Ostrea edulis L.) on the south coast of Ireland". Aquaculture. 144 (144): 53–63. Bibcode:1996Aquac.144...53C. doi:10.1016/S0044-8486(96)01290-2.
- Reilly, P.; Mulcahy, M.F. (1993). "Humoral antibody response in Atlantic salmon (Salmo salar L.) immunised with extracts derived from the ectoparasitic caligid copepods, Caligus elongatus (Nordmann, 1832) and Lepeophtheirus salmonis (Kroyer, 1838)". Fish & Shellfish Immunology. 3 (3): 59–70. Bibcode:1993FSI.....3...59R. doi:10.1006/fsim.1993.1006.
