= Tuskar Rock =

Tuskar Rock may refer to one of the following:

- Tuskar Rock, Ireland, an island off County Wexford
- Tuskar Rock air disaster at Tuskar Rock, Ireland, in 1968
- Tuskar Rock, a publishing imprint founded in 2008 by author Colm Tóibín and literary agent Peter Straus

== See also ==
- Tusker Rock, Bristol Channel, Wales
