= Flight 712 =

Flight 712 may refer to the following aviation accidents:

- Aer Lingus Flight 712, crashed on 24 March 1968
- BOAC Flight 712, crashed on 8 April 1968
