= Marine Institute Ireland =

State agency

Marine Institute
- Foras na Mara

Agency overview
- Formed: 1991; 35 years ago
- Jurisdiction: Government of Ireland
- Headquarters: Galway, Ireland; 53.24776°N 8.97814°W
- Employees: 237 (as of 2021)
- Minister responsible: Martin Heydon
- Agency executives: Rick Officer, CEO; Martin Sisk, Chairperson
- Parent department: Department of Agriculture, Food and the Marine
- Website: www.marine.ie

The Marine Institute (Irish: Foras na Mara) is a state agency in Ireland that provides government, public agencies and the maritime industry with scientific, advisory and economic development services, aiming to inform policy-making, regulation and the sustainable management and growth of the country's marine resources. Founded in 1991 on foot of a 1974 report, the institute undertakes and promotes marine research and development. The agency's staff and operations are governed by a ministerially-appointed board. Based at its headquarters near Galway, it has an office in Dublin and two research vessels.

== History ==
Following the recommendation of the 1974 National Science Council report Ireland, Science and the Sea, the Marine Institute was established by the Irish government under the Marine Institute Act of 1991 "to undertake, to co-ordinate, to promote and to assist in marine research and development and to provide such services that, in the opinion of the Institute will promote economic development and create employment and protect the marine environment".

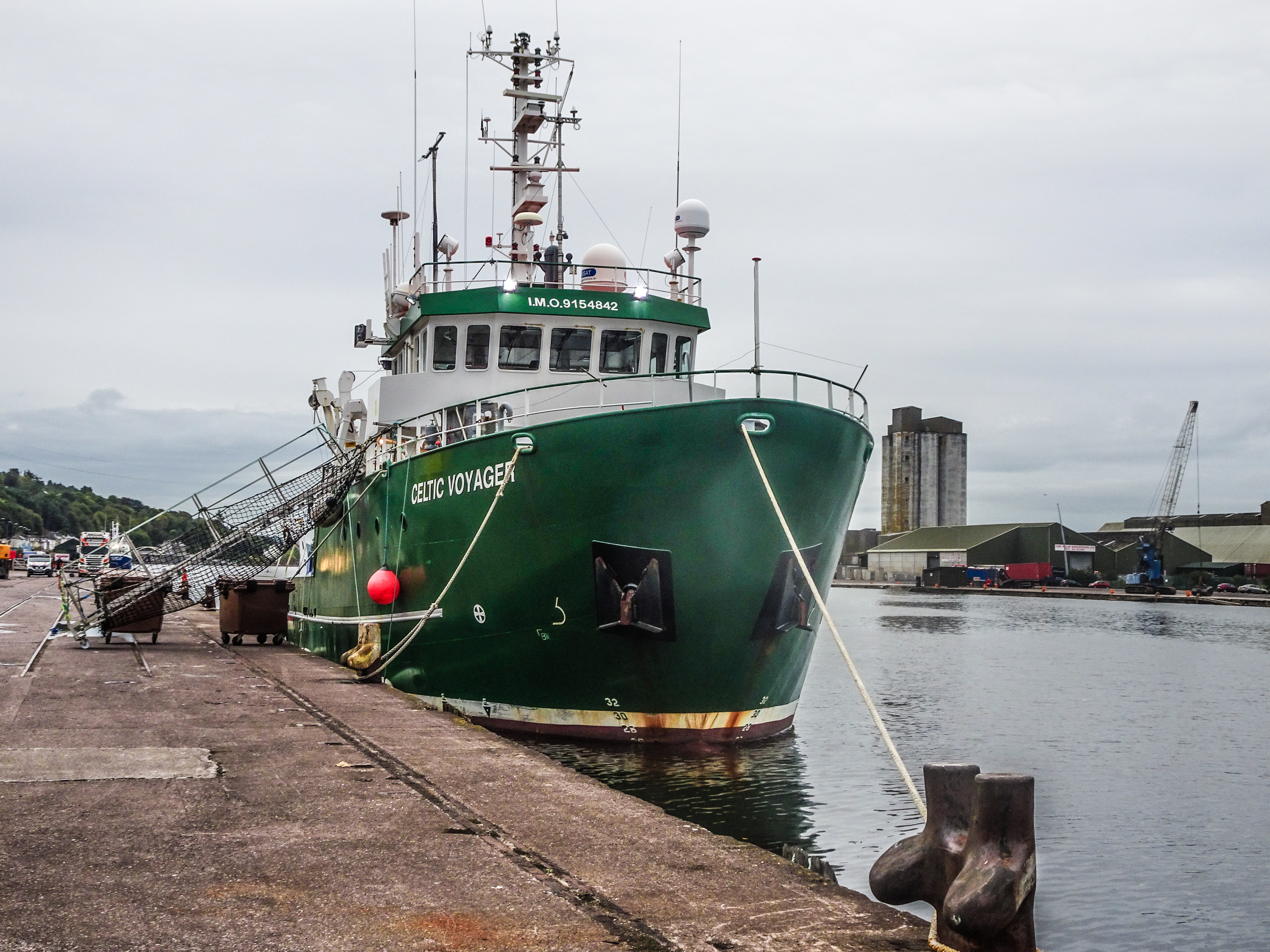
RV Celtic Voyager was launched in 1998.

Starting with the appointment of its chair – Dr Máire Mulcahy – and chief executive officer – Dr Peter Heffernan – followed by four programme managers in Marine Environment, Marine Food, Marine Technology and Marine Leisure and Tourism in 1995, the Marine Institute grew to include the Irish Marine Data Centre and the then marine research facilities at Abbotstown, County Dublin, and the Salmon Research Agency at Newport.

1998 saw the arrival of Ireland's first purpose-built research vessel, the 31-metre long RV Celtic Voyager. This was followed in 2002 by the arrival of the larger 65-metre deepwater research vessel RV Celtic Explorer. 2006 saw the Marine Institute move from Dublin to a purpose-built headquarters and laboratory complex near Galway. A deepwater Remotely Operated Vehicle, Holland 1, was delivered in 2008.

== Locations ==
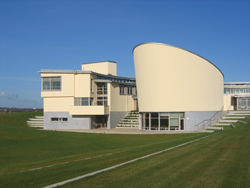
Marine Institute Headquarters, Rinville, Oranmore, Galway, Ireland

The institute is headquartered on a peninsula at Rinville (Renville), southwest of Oranmore, County Galway, while its Irish Maritime Development Office (IMDO) is located in Dublin. The Marine Institute also operates an aquaculture and catchment management laboratory and office facility at Furnace, near Newport, County Mayo, as well as offices and laboratories in a number of Ireland's fishing ports.

The purpose-built headquarters building, which has won several architectural awards, houses research laboratories, an auditorium, a marine science library and an office "crescent".

== Governance and staff ==
The institute is governed and overseen by a board appointed by the Minister for Agriculture, Food and the Marine, the members being appointed on staggered terms, generally of five years, and with a mix of profiles. The board appoints the CEO, sets the strategic plan and measurements, the annual budget and other policies, and oversees hiring, public reporting and risk and financial management.

The Marine Institute employs approximately 200 staff including specialists in fisheries, marine environment, technology, aquaculture, catchment management, ocean energy, functional foods and marine climate change, as well as information technology, communications and logistical support staff. The office of the CEO provides overall direction and co-ordination of foresight, strategic and research planning activities at national and international level.

== Vessels ==
The Marine Institute oversees the operation of Ireland's two purpose-built research vessels, the RV Celtic Explorer, and the RV Tom Crean. The latter was launched in 2022 after a two-year build in Vigo Spain. The organisation also operates a Remotely Operated Underwater Vehicle, the Holland 1.

=== Active vessels ===
Name	Image	Type	Entered service	Displacement	Length	Notes
RV Tom Crean	Tom Crean	Multi-purpose research vessel	2022		52.8 m	Designed by Skipsteknisk AS, and built by Astilleros Armon Vigo S.A.
RV Celtic Explorer	Celtic Explorer	Multi-purpose research vessel	2003	2,425 GT	65.5 m	
Dulra na Mara		Inshore research vessel		15.1 GT	12.3 m	

=== Retired vessels ===
Name	Image	Type	Service years	Displacement	Length	Notes
RV Lough Beltra		Fishing trawler/research vessel	1976–1997		21 m	
RV Celtic Voyager	Celtic Voyager	Multi-purpose research vessel	1997–2022	340 t	31.4 m	

== Service areas ==
The Marine Institute's service areas cover six functions: "Fisheries Ecosystems Advisory Services", "Marine Environment and Food Safety Services", "Oceans, Climate and Information Services", "Policy, Innovation and Research Support", "Corporate Services", and the "Irish Maritime Development Office".

=== Marine Environment and Food Safety Services (MEFS) ===
Marine Environment & Food Safety Services (MEFS) provides essential scientific advice and a range of marine environmental monitoring services to help ensure Irish seafood products meet approved standards. It also provides expert integrated advice to, and on behalf of, government departments and agencies, including the Department of Agriculture, Food and the Marine and Department of Climate, Energy and the Environment.

The 'Fish Health Team' works with the marine food industry to protect the health status of Irish farmed salmon, trout and shellfish. The Fish Health Unit is the Irish National Reference Laboratory for finfish, mollusc and crustacean diseases. The team tests aquatic animal samples, as required under EU and national legislation, and supports the aquaculture industry and the inland fisheries sector in maintaining Ireland's superior fish and shellfish health status. The Fish Health Unit is also the National Competent Authority for the implementation of aquatic animal health legislation under EU and national legislation and monitors the movement of finfish and shellfish into and within Ireland.

'Food Safety Monitoring' is tasked to ensure that Irish marine fish, shellfish and seafood products remain safe from elevated levels of residues and contaminants. The programmes in this area include monitoring of Irish fish, shellfish and seafood products to assure that they are safe from elevated levels of residues and contaminants.

=== Fisheries Ecosystems Advisory Services (FEAS) ===
The Fisheries Ecosystems Advisory Services unit researches, assesses and advises on the sustainable exploitation of the marine fisheries resources in the waters around Ireland, and on the impacts of fisheries on the ecosystem.

FEAS is involved in linking fisheries data with oceanographic, seabed mapping and climate change data, and examining predator prey. FEAS are also charged with meeting Ireland's obligations under the EU Data Collection Framework. The Framework supports the scientific advice needed to underpin the Common Fisheries Policy. As such, the unit carries out fisheries surveys in the waters around Ireland to collect data on species of fish and shellfish. Survey work is also conducted aboard commercial fishing vessels and unit staff collect data on the age and length profile of landings and examine fleet activity and fishing patterns. This information is used to produce the annual 'Stock Book' which is a source of scientific advice to the Irish government and the industry and to support fisheries negotiations with the European Union.

=== Ocean Science and Information Services (OSIS) ===
The Ocean Science and Information Services (OSIS) team provide support for national and international marine research programmes in a number of areas.

'Research Vessel Operations' manage the Marine Institute's research fleet, the RV Celtic Explorer and the RV Celtic Voyager, and also manage the foreign research vessel notification process. Both vessels are fitted with scientific instrumentation, laboratories and IT equipment and are used for fisheries research, environmental monitoring, seabed mapping, oceanology, seismic surveys, student training and meteorological investigations.

The 'Advanced Mapping Service Group' carries out routine hydrographic and geophysical mapping for the Irish National Seabed Survey, the Integrated Mapping for the Sustainable Development of Irelands Marine Resource (INFOMAR) and benthic fisheries projects.

'Oceanography and Ocean Modelling' provide oceanographic services, including the Irish Marine Data Buoy Observation Network of five buoys around the Irish coast. It is also involved in the establishment of an Irish tide gauge network, ocean modelling, satellite remote sensing and oceanographic support of research programmes related to marine fisheries and environment.

The 'Information Services & Development' team are responsible for the co-ordination of Marine Institute data activities and the provision of Information Technology infrastructure and information management for the Marine Institute.

The 'Advanced Marine Technology' programme, within the OSIS unit, is part of Sea Change, Ireland's marine research and innovation strategy.

=== Irish Maritime Development Office (IMDO) ===
The Irish Maritime Development Office (IMDO) of the Marine Institute is a development, promotional and marketing agency for the shipping services sector. The IMDO's statutory mandate is to "promote and develop growth in the Irish shipping industry, and to attract to Ireland additional marine related service sector operations along with key players in International Shipping and ancillary services".

== See also ==
- Irish Naval Service
- Irish Coast Guard
- List of Irish state vessels
