= RV Celtic Explorer =

Research Vessel/fishing trawler

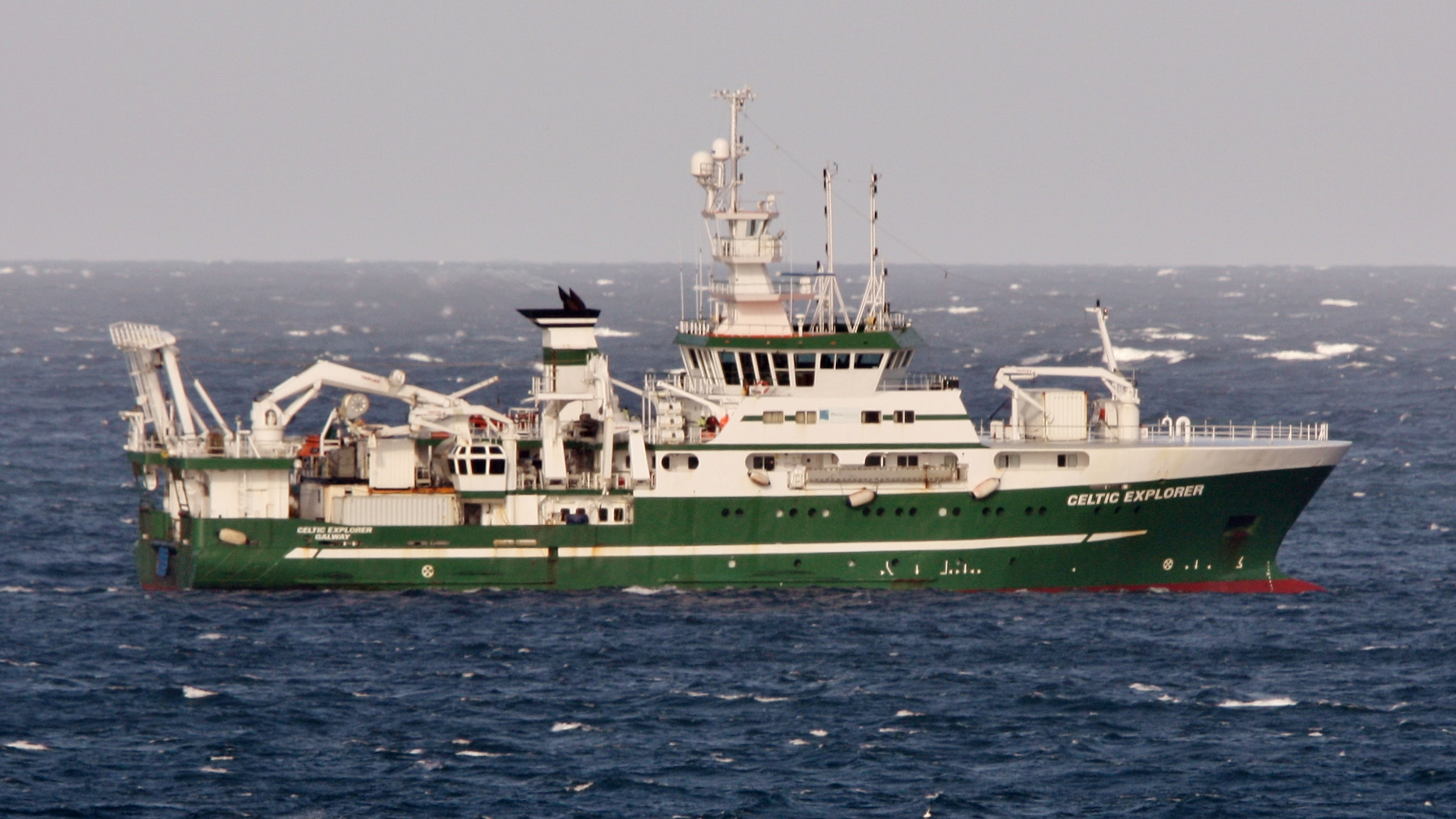
- RV Celtic Explorer off Lady's Holm, Shetland.

History

Ireland
- Name: RV Celtic Explorer
- Owner: Marine Institute
- Operator: Marine Institute
- In service: 2003
- Identification: Call sign: EIGB; IMO number: 9244439; MMSI number: 250487000
- Status: in active service, as of 2024

General characteristics
- Class & type: fishing trawler
- Tonnage: 2,425 GT
- Length: 65.5 m (215 ft)
- Beam: 15 metres (49 ft)
- Draught: 5.8 metres (19 ft)
- Speed: 10 knots (19 km/h; 12 mph)
- Endurance: 35 days

The Celtic Explorer is a multi-purpose research vessel operated by the Marine Institute in Galway, Ireland. It came into service in 2003 for use in fisheries acoustics research, oceanographic, hydrographic and geological as well as buoy/deep water mooring and ROV Operations. The vessel is 65.5 metres (215 ft) long and has a capacity to accommodate 35 personnel of which 20-22 can be scientists. The vessel's base is the Port of Galway which is located on the west coast of Ireland and offers ready access to the Atlantic Ocean.

In 2024, Celtic Explorer carried the Nereid Under Ice (NUI) remote-controlled submersible to study the glaciers of Greenland and their impact on sea level rise.

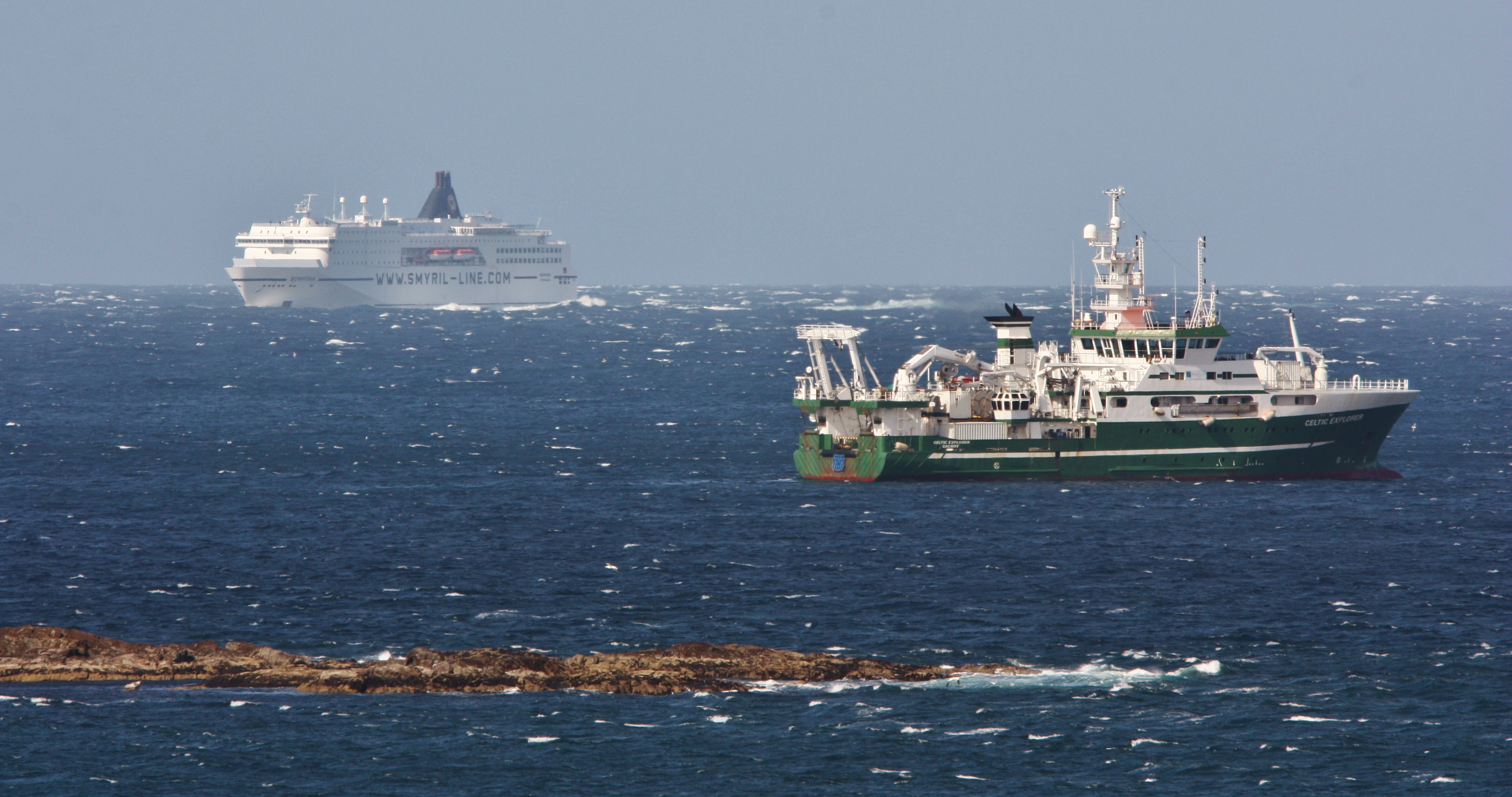
Norrona And RV Celtic Explorer

== Capabilities ==
- Acoustically silent (ICES 209), which minimises fish avoidance and provides an ideal environment for the collection of high quality acoustic data
- Dynamic positioning
- Retractable drop keel for acoustic transducers and other instrumentation
- EM302, EM2040 & EM1002 multi-beams (reaching depths of up to 5000m)
- Large dry and wet laboratories
- A full complement of survey equipment and winches suitable for coring, trawling and drop camera operations
- Adapted to accommodate a variety of Remotely Operated Vehicles including the Deepwater ROV Holland I
- Maximum endurance of 35 day
