= Shep-en-hor =

7th century BC Egyptian woman

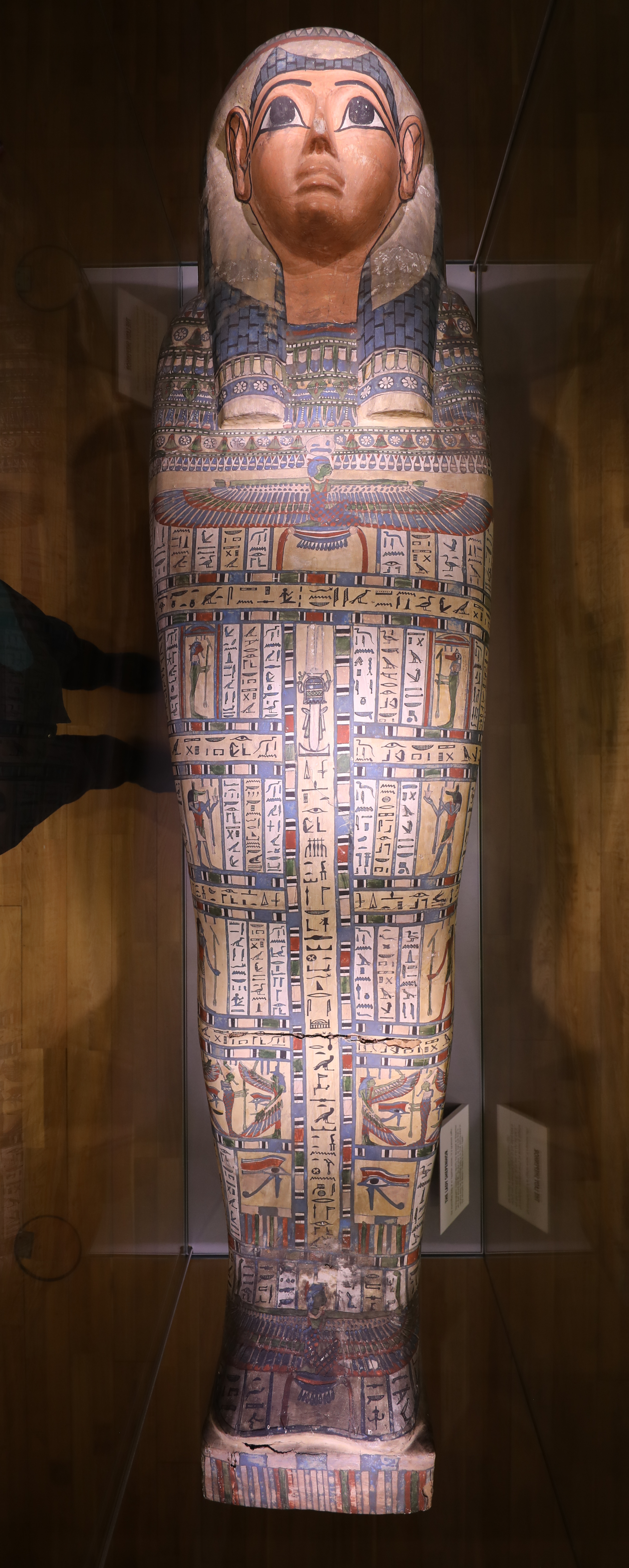
Coffin of Shep-en-hor

Lady Shep-en-hor c. 600 BC was an Egyptian woman whose coffin, and possibly mummy, was originally found in Thebes but now resides in the Hunterian Museum and Art Gallery in Glasgow. Her remains and coffin were first known to have been in the ownership of Giovanni Belzoni and been the collection of the museum since 1820 when they were donated by Joshua Heywood. In 2026 cloth was used to block visitor’s view of the mummy although not the coffin.

== Family ==
According to the coffin, Shep-en-hor was the daughter of In-Amun-nif-nebu (father) and Irt-irw (mother). (Note: Other transliterations are possible)

== Coffin ==
The Coffin is made from sycamore and has been extensively embellished. The text on the coffin mostly consists of prayers although it mentions Shep-en-hor's name as well as those of her mother and father. It also states the location of its burial was West Thebes.

== Mummy ==
The poorly documented provenance of the Coffin and Mummy prior to their donation to the museum make it impossible to be sure if the mummy is actually that of Shep-en-hor. The mummy has not been unwrapped. She was X-rayed on 21 December 1977 and was MRI scanned at the end of the 2000s. Pelvic dimensions resulted in the radiographers involved in the X-ray concluding that the mummy was that of a woman 1.47 m tall under the age of 40. Her wrappings contained a large number of faience beads which were formerly part of a bead net.
