= L. P. W. Renouf =

British biologist (1887-1968)

Louis Percy Watt Renouf FRSE MRIA (1887–1968) was a 20th century British biologist working in Ireland. As an author Renouf specialised in texts aimed at children.

== Life ==
He was born on 11 December 1887 in (or near) Birmingham. He was given a strict Roman Catholic education at Erdington Abbey then attended King Edward VII Grammar School in Birmingham. He then studied Biology at Cambridge University graduating MA in 1914 then obtaining a Diploma in Agriculture.

In 1922 he was appointed Professor of Zoology at University College, Cork. In 1936 he was elected a Fellow of the Royal Society of Edinburgh. His proposers were Sir John Graham Kerr, James Chumley, Robert Arnot Staig and James Hartley Ashworth.

He died at St Philomena's at Tivoli in Cork in Eire on 20 January 1968.

== Publications ==
- The Stamp Zoo (1930)
- Animal Life on the Seashore (1930)
- Fundamentals of Biology (1932 reprinted 1948) with J W Stork
- Junior Biology (1933) with J W Stork
- Plant and Animal Ecology (1948) with J W Stork
- Evolution (1953)

== Family ==
In 1914 he married Mary Wareing.
