= RV Celtic Voyager =

Multi-Purpose Research Vessel

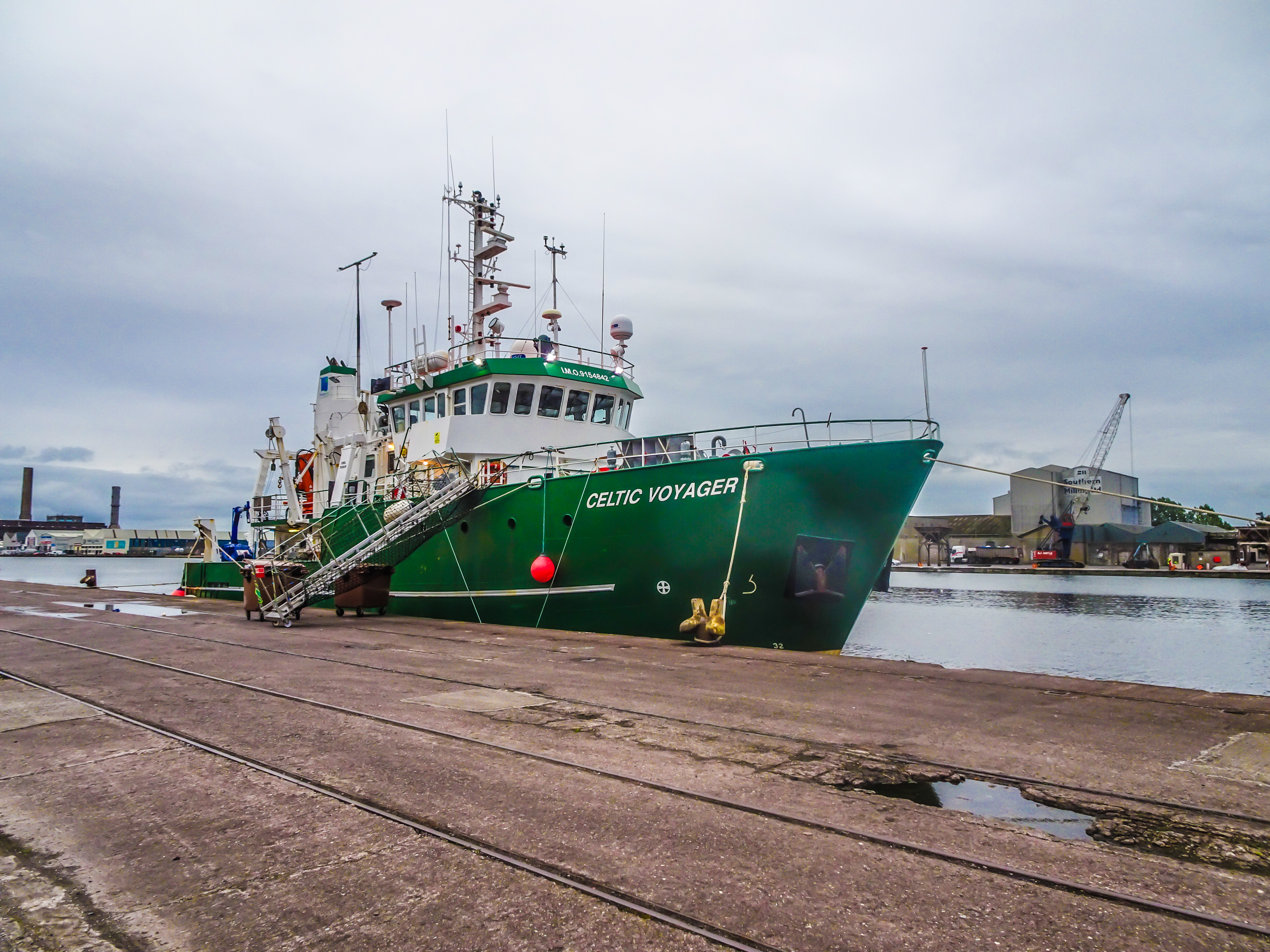
- RV Celtic Voyager off Horgan's Quay, Cork.

History

Canada
- Name: Celtic Voyager
- Owner: Qikiqtaaluk Corporation
- Operator: Qikiqtaaluk Corporation
- Cost: IR£1.75 million
- Identification: IMO number: 9154842; MMSI number: 376775000; Callsign: J8B6496
- Status: Active

General characteristics
- Type: Multi-purpose research vessel
- Tonnage: 340 tons
- Length: 31.4 m (103 ft 0 in)
- Beam: 8 m (26 ft 3 in)
- Draught: 4 m (13 ft 1 in)
- Speed: 13 knots (24 km/h; 15 mph)
- Range: 8,000 nmi (15,000 km; 9,200 mi)
- Endurance: 14 days
- Complement: ? (? crew, 6–8 researchers)

RV Celtic Voyager is a multi-purpose research vessel operated by Qikiqtaaluk Corporation as of 2023. Prior to this, the vessel was operated by the Marine Institute of Galway, Ireland from 1997 to 2022. It was Ireland's first custom-built multi-purpose research vessel, replacing the repurposed fishing trawler RV Lough Beltra. Celtic Voyager was built in the Netherlands in 1997.

== History ==
Celtic Voyager was constructed by Scheepswerf Visser in Den Helder, Netherlands, being delivered in July 1997. The vessel cost IR£1.75 million, with 75% of the cost being funded by the European Regional Development Fund. It replaced the then-24 year old RV Lough Beltra. While it had much greater capabilities, its range only reached 20% of Ireland's 220 million-acre sea territory.

From 1997 to 2022, the Celtic Voyager was operated by the Marine Institute of Ireland performing marine science, research and monitoring roles.

On 12 July 2022, the Celtic Voyager was retired by the Marine Institute, and put up for sale. In its 25-year service with the Marine Institute, the vessel completed more than 600 surveys, enabled more than 6,500 science days, and sailed more than 550,000 miles (890,000 km). It was replaced in this role by the RV Tom Crean.

In late 2023, the vessel was purchased by Qikiqtaaluk Corporation of Nunavut, Canada, to be used for fisheries research and seabed mapping in Northern territories and Nunavut.
