= RV Tom Crean =

Research Vessel

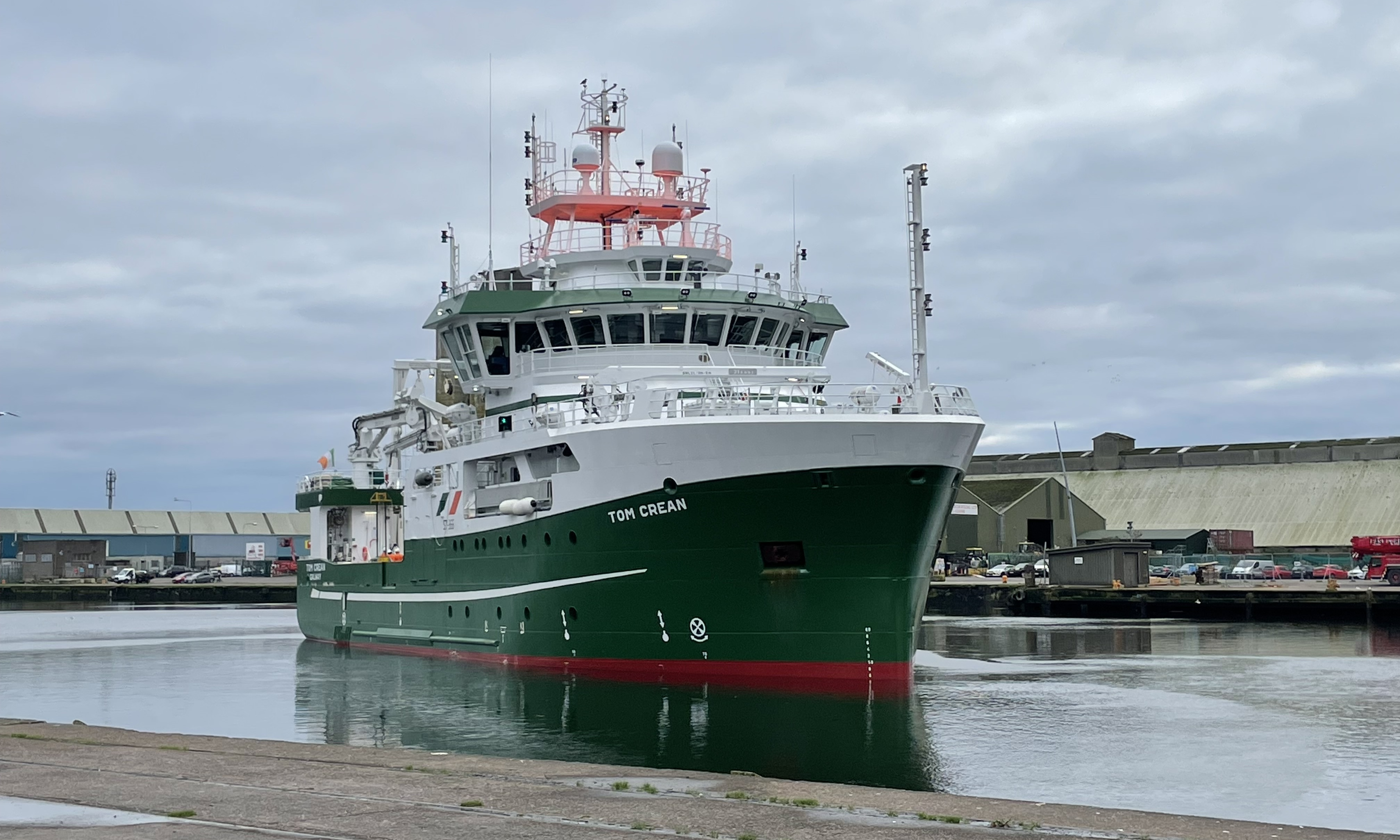
- RV Tom Crean in Cork on 1 December 2022

History

Ireland
- Name: Tom Crean
- Namesake: Tom Crean
- Owner: Marine Institute
- Operator: Marine Institute
- Builder: Astilleros Armon Vigo
- Cost: €25 million
- Laid down: November 2020
- Launched: November 2021
- Christened: 6 October 2022
- Acquired: 8 July 2022
- Maiden voyage: 15 July 2022
- In service: 6 October 2022
- Identification: IMO number: 9903516; MMSI number: 250006431; Callsign: EIYX3; Hull number: V129
- Status: Active as of 2022

General characteristics
- Type: Multi-purpose research vessel
- Length: 52.8 m (173 ft 3 in)
- Beam: 14 m (45 ft 11 in)
- Draught: 5.2 m (17 ft 1 in)
- Installed power: 2 × 1,350 kW Mitsubishi SR16 diesel generators, 1 × 400 kW generator
- Propulsion: 1 × 2,000 kW Indar electric main propulsion motor with 7 blade silent propeller, 780 kW Schottel omnidirectional pump jet bow thruster, 400 kW Schottel stern tunnel thruster
- Speed: 13 knots (24 km/h; 15 mph)
- Range: 8,000 nmi (15,000 km; 9,200 mi)
- Endurance: 21 days
- Complement: 26 (12 crew, 14 researchers)

RV Tom Crean is a multi-purpose research vessel operated by the Marine Institute of Galway, Ireland. It entered service in 2022 for use in fisheries research, oceanographic, hydrographic and geological research as well as deploying and maintaining weather buoys, observational infrastructure and remotely operated underwater vehicles (ROVs) in Ireland's exclusive economic zone. According to its owners it is the "worlds quietest research vessel", being the first vessel to exceed the International Council for the Exploration of the Sea (ICES) noise standard for fisheries research. Named after Irish Antarctic explorer Tom Crean, the vessel is 52.8 metres (173 ft 3 in) long and can accommodate 12 crew members and 14 researchers. It is able to go to sea for at least 21 days at a time, and is designed to operate in harsh sea conditions. The vessel was commissioned to replace the RV Celtic Voyager.

== Design ==
The contract for the ship design was awarded to Norwegian ship design consultants Skipsteknisk AS with the design designated as ST-366 after a European Union tender process. The Tom Crean was designed as a silent research vessel: In order to minimise fish avoidance and collect high-quality acoustic data, its design and operation meet the criteria of the ICES 209 noise standard for fisheries research. These noise mitigation measures include a silent 7-bladed propeller and sound insulation for internal equipment. When at port, the vessel's onboard generators can be shut down and it can draw power from onshore facilities to reduce fuel consumption.

It is equipped with a dynamic positioning (DP1) and anti-roll system for operations in heavy seas. For oceanographic research, a heave-compensated conductivity temperature and depth (CTD) system is fitted, with 4,500 m (14,800 ft) of wire. A CTD hangar, CTD laboratory and controlled temperature chemical laboratory are also fitted. An 8-ton starboard side T-frame allows deploying drop cameras, grabs samplers and corers to a depth of 4,000 m (13,000 ft). A stern mounted 10-ton A-frame can articulate through 170 degrees can be used for deploying and recovering equipment such as ROVs and towed sleds, and for research fishing operations. The Marine Institute's Deepwater Holland I Work-class ROV and the University of Limerick (UL)'s Etain sub-Atlantic ROV can be positioned on the aft deck. The vessel can carry up to three TEU containers.

== Construction ==
The vessel was constructed by Astilleros Armon Vigo at Armon Shipyard b.129, Spain.

== Service history ==
After construction, the vessel completed sea trials in May 2022 and was officially commissioned on 8 July 2022. In its first year of service, the vessel completed 296 survey days across 20 surveys, involving 180 scientists and travelling more than 32,000 nautical miles.

One of the missions the Tom Crean is tasked with is performing INFOMAR (Integrated Mapping for the Sustainable Development of Ireland's Marine Resources) surveys for Geological Survey Ireland. During its first year of service, five INFOMAR surveys were carried out, mapping an area of 6,317 square kilometres (2,439 sq mi). Later INFOMAR surveys located two previously undiscovered suspected shipwrecks, and mapped hundreds of shipwrecks in total. The second phase of INFOMAR surveys ran until 2026, with the Tom Crean mapping the Celtic Sea off the County Cork coast and the Atlantic Ocean off counties Kerry, Clare and Galway. In June of 2026, it was announced that funding for the INFOMAR survey was extended, with a final €11.5m to allow for the mapping of the seabed around the country to be completed. It has also collected data from locations such as the Porcupine Bank, approximately 300 kilometres (190 mi) west of Kerry; Aran Grounds; the Celtic Sea; and the Bay of Biscay.
