= Hunterian Museum and Art Gallery =

Museum in Glasgow, Scotland

Coordinates: 55°52′19″N 4°17′19″W

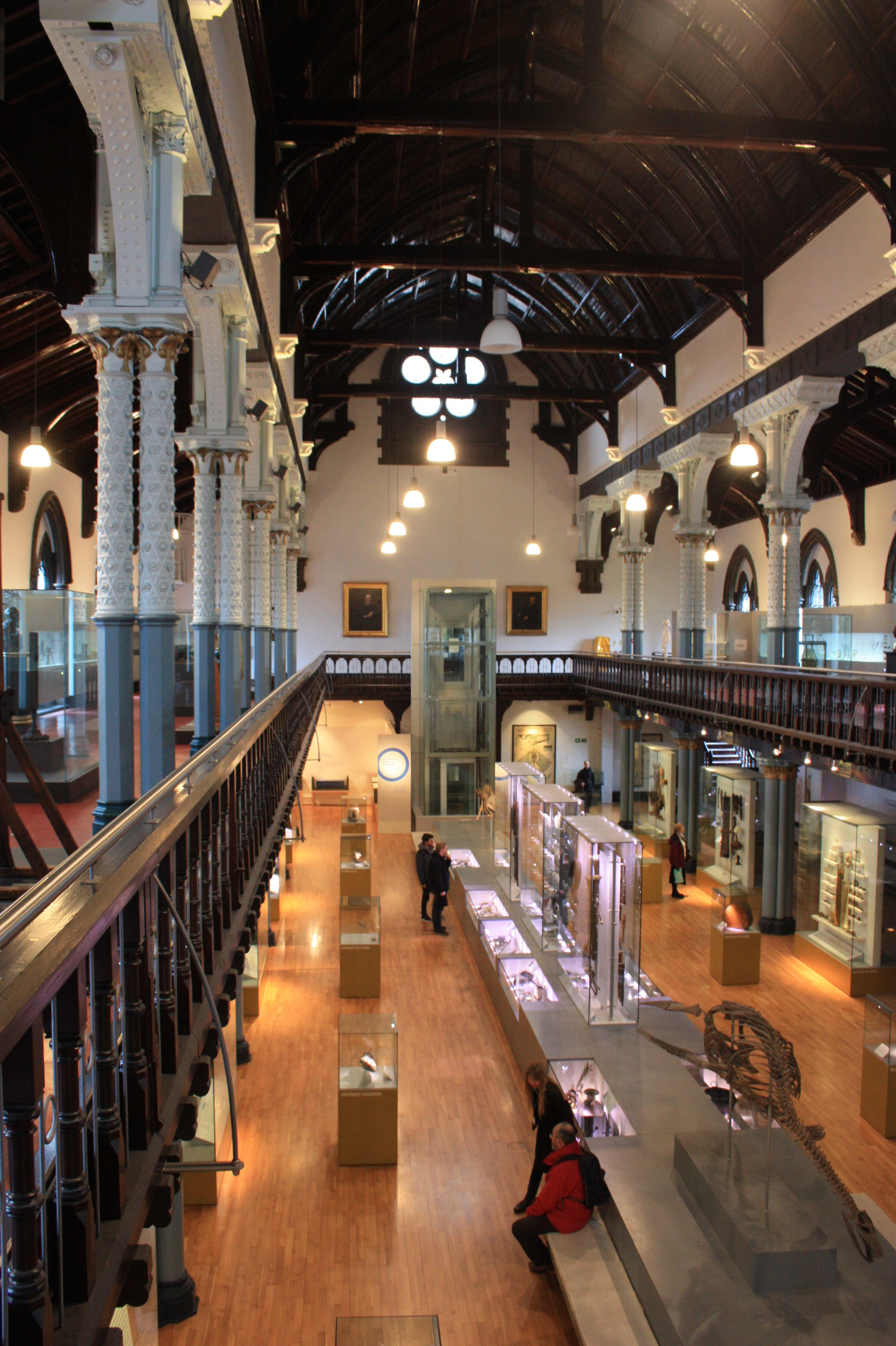
- Main hall of the Hunterian Museum

- Location within Scotland
- Established: 1807
- Type: Museum and art gallery
- Website: www.gla.ac.uk/hunterian

The Hunterian is a complex of museums located in and operated by the University of Glasgow in Glasgow, Scotland. It is the oldest museum in Scotland. It covers the Hunterian Museum, the Hunterian Art Gallery, the Mackintosh House, the Zoology Museum and the Anatomy Museum, which are all located in various buildings on the main campus of the university in the west end of Glasgow.

== History ==
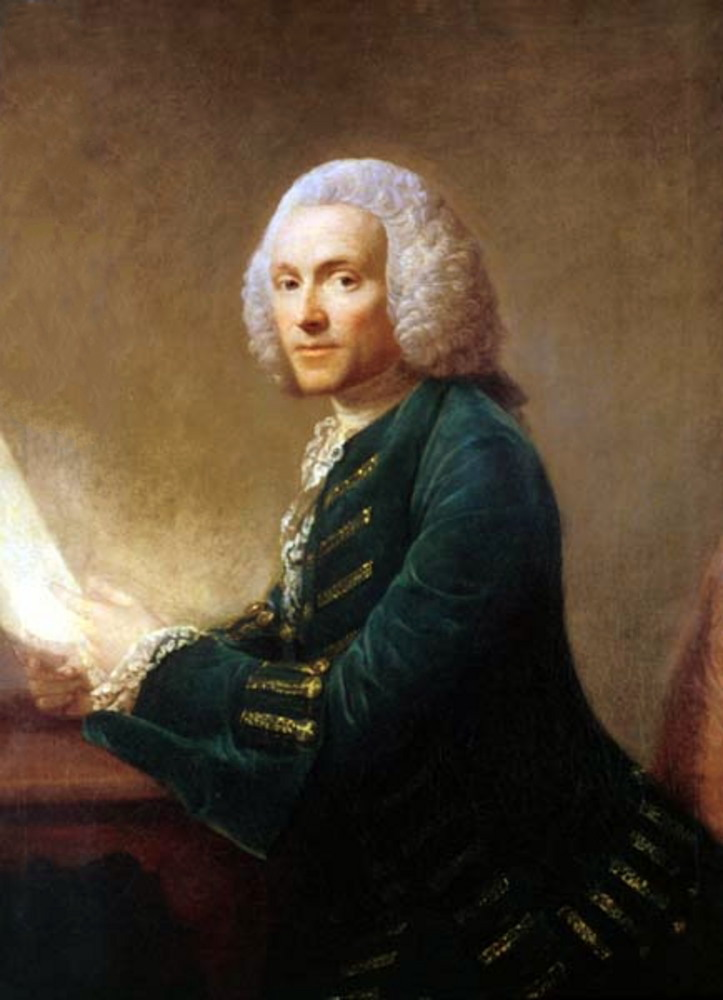
William Hunter (1718–1783), anatomist and collector.

In 1783, William Hunter, a Scottish anatomist and physician who studied at the University of Glasgow, died in London. His will stipulated that his substantial and varied collections should be donated to the University of Glasgow. Hunter, writing to William Cullen, stated that they were "to be well and carefully packed up and safely conveyed to Glasgow and delivered to the Principal and Faculty of the College of Glasgow to whom I give and bequeath the same to be kept and preserved by them and their successors for ever... in such sort, way, manner and form as ... shall seem most fit and most conducive to the improvement of the students of the said University of Glasgow."

As well as Hunter's medical collections, which arose from his own work, Hunter collected widely, often assisted by his many royal and aristocratic patrons. He and his agents scoured Europe for coins, minerals, paintings and prints, ethnographic materials, books and manuscripts, as well as insects and other biological specimens. Hunter's eclectic bequest forms the core of the collections, but have grown considerably, and now include some of the most important collections of work by artists such as Charles Rennie Mackintosh and James McNeill Whistler, as well as superb geological, zoological, anatomical, archaeological, ethnographic and scientific instrument collections.

The museum first opened in 1807 in a specially constructed building off the High Street, adjoining the original campus of the university. For this, Hunter ensured funds for its building and design by architect William Stark through his three trustees: his nephew Matthew Baillie; his Scottish lawyer Robert Barclay of Capelrig House; and John Millar, cousin of William Cullen. When the university moved west to its new site at Gilmorehill (to escape crowding and pollution in the city centre), the museum moved too. In 1870, the Hunterian collections were transferred to the university's present site and assigned halls in Sir George Gilbert Scott's neo-Gothic building.

At first, the entire collection was housed together and displayed in the packed conditions common in museums of that time, but significant sections were later moved away to other parts of the university. The Zoological collections are now housed within the Graham Kerr Building, the art collections in The Hunterian Art Gallery, and Hunter's library containing some 10,000 printed books and 650 manuscripts, finally received in 1807, in Glasgow University Library. Lady Shep-en-hor's coffin and possible mummy were donated to the museum in 1820 by Joshua Heywood. The university's Librarian Professor Lockhart Muirhead became the first Keeper of the Hunterian Museum in 1823. Hunter's anatomical collections are housed in the Allen Thomson Building and his pathological preparations at the Royal Infirmary, Glasgow.

== Notable Curators ==
- Robert Arnot Staig c. 1905 to c. 1945
- William Smellie (geologist)
- John Young (1823–1900), from 1859
- John Young (professor of natural history) (1835–1902), from 1866 to 1902

== The museum and gallery's current facilities ==
=== Hunterian Museum ===
Housed in large halls in George Gilbert Scott's University buildings on Gilmorehill, the museum features extensive displays relating to William Hunter and his collections, Roman Scotland (especially the Antonine Wall), geology, ethnography, ancient Egypt, scientific instruments, coins and medals, and much more.

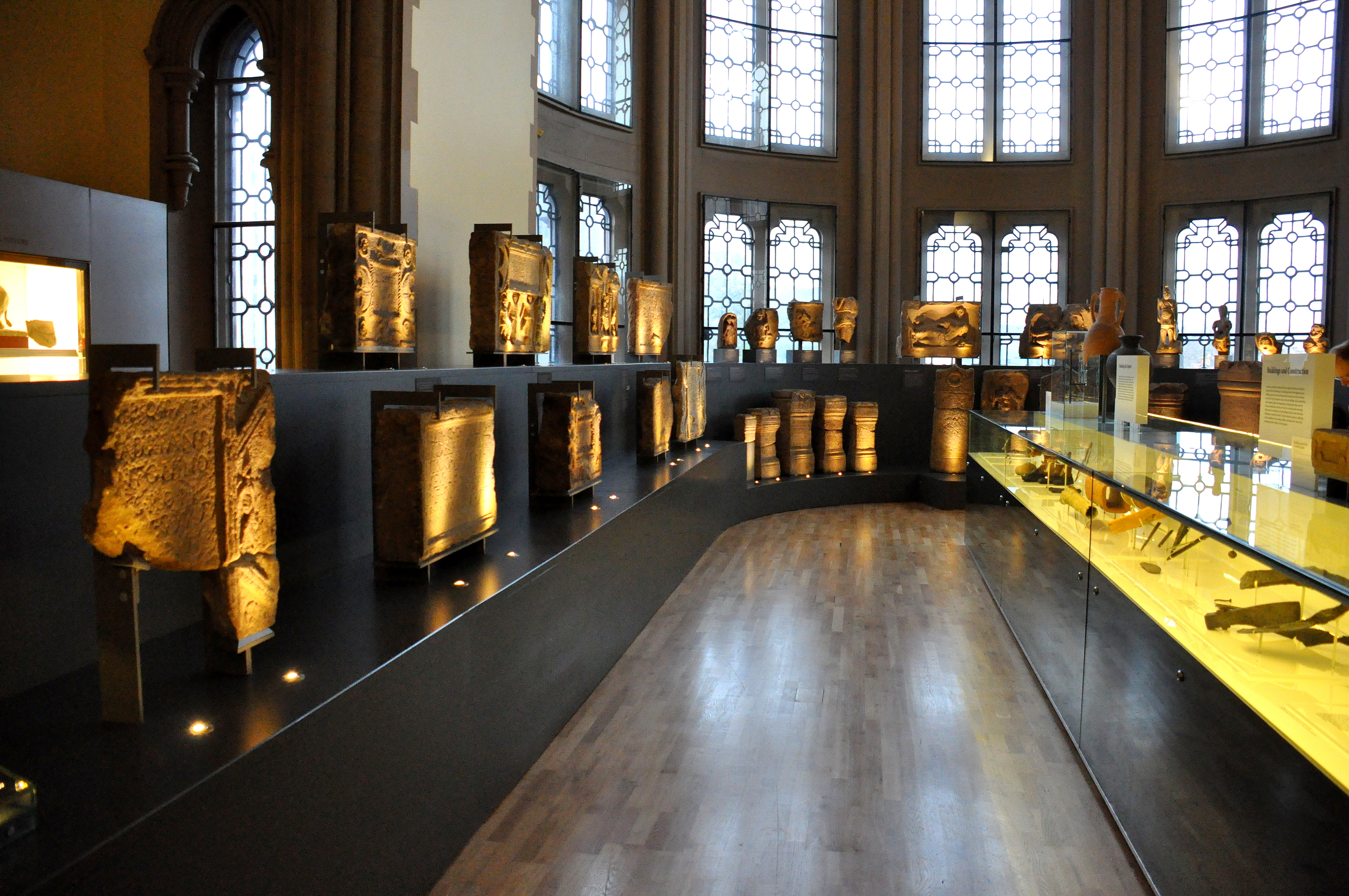
The Antonine Wall, Rome's final frontier, the Hunterian Museum.

The museum contains many donated collections, such as the Begg Collection of fossils donated by James Livingstone Begg in the 1940s.

The museum contains a high number of scientific instruments owned by or created by Lord Kelvin and other 19th century instrument makers.

In September 2016, the new Hunterian Collections and Study Centre, embracing the full range and activities of the museum and the art gallery, opened in the transformed Kelvin Hall in Phase 1 of a partnership with Glasgow City Council Glasgow Life and the National Library of Scotland.

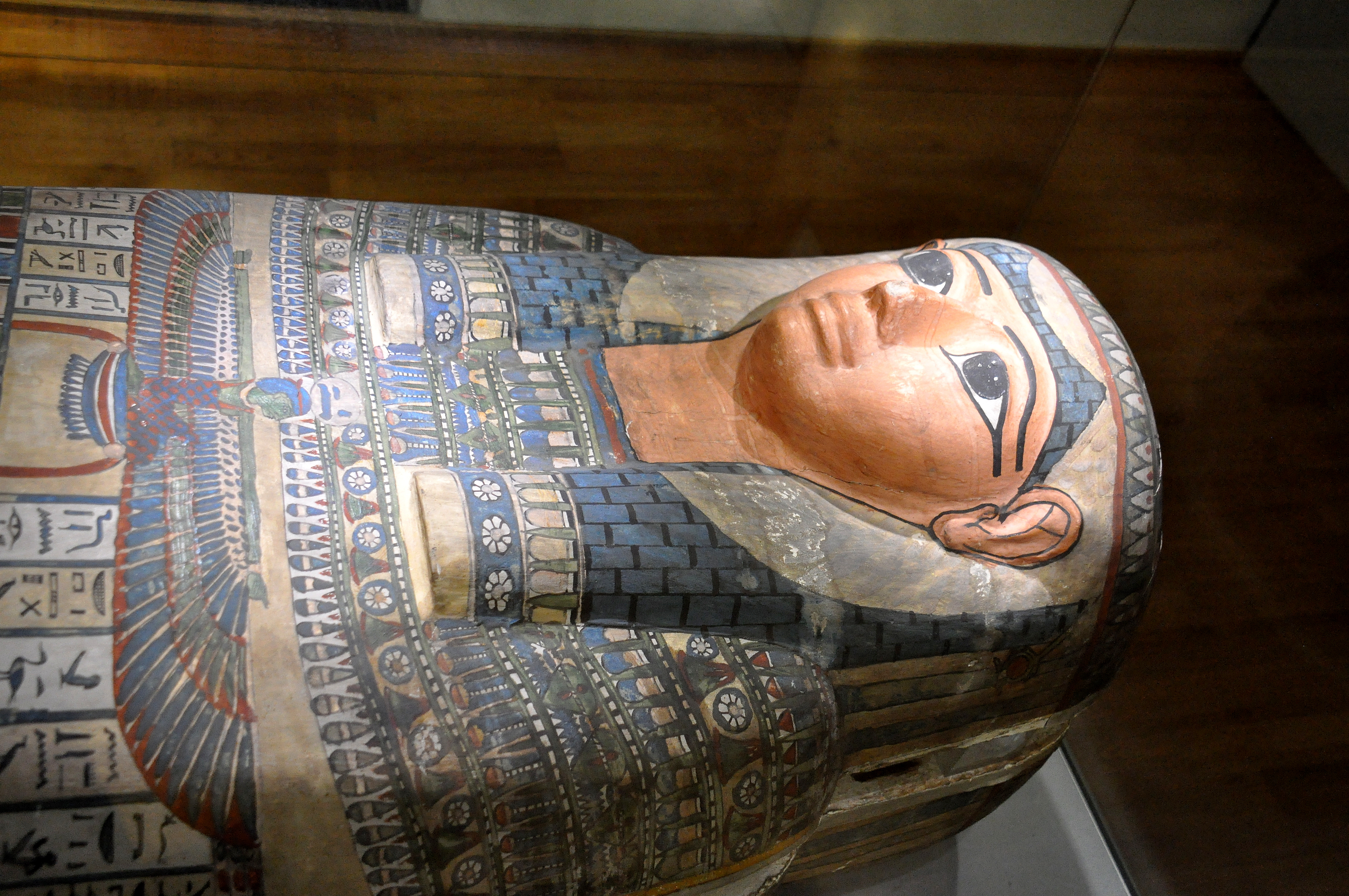
The Lady Shep-en-hor, the Hunterian Museum, Glasgow University.

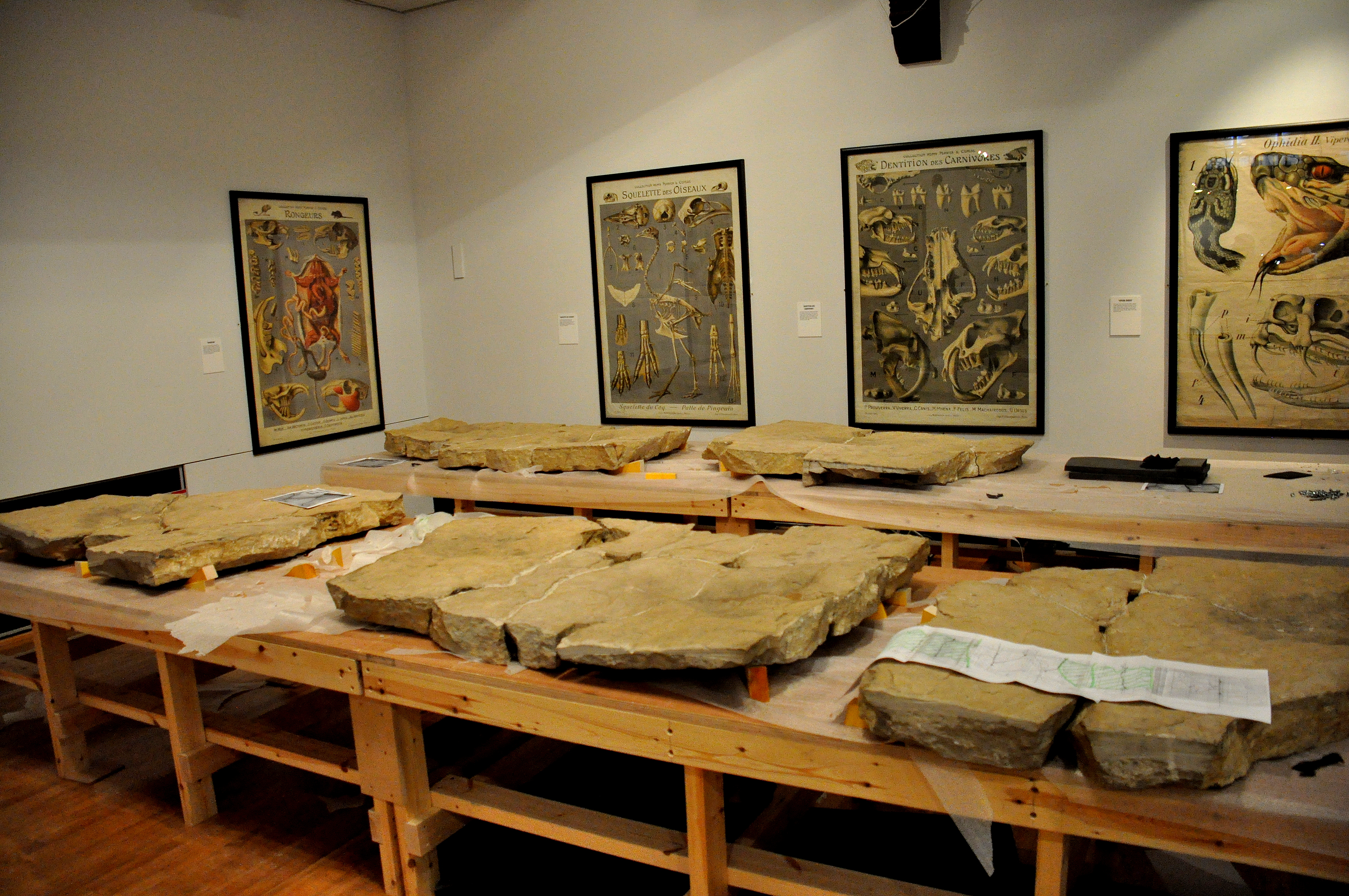
Various fossils on display at the Hunterian Museum, Glasgow.

=== Zoology Museum ===
Most of the zoology collections, including those of William Hunter, are displayed in a separate museum within the Graham Kerr building, which also houses most of the university's zoological research and teaching. This is also open to the general public. The insect collections are particularly important and extensive, and have been the subject of exhibitions of note in the 2010s.

=== Hunterian Art Gallery ===
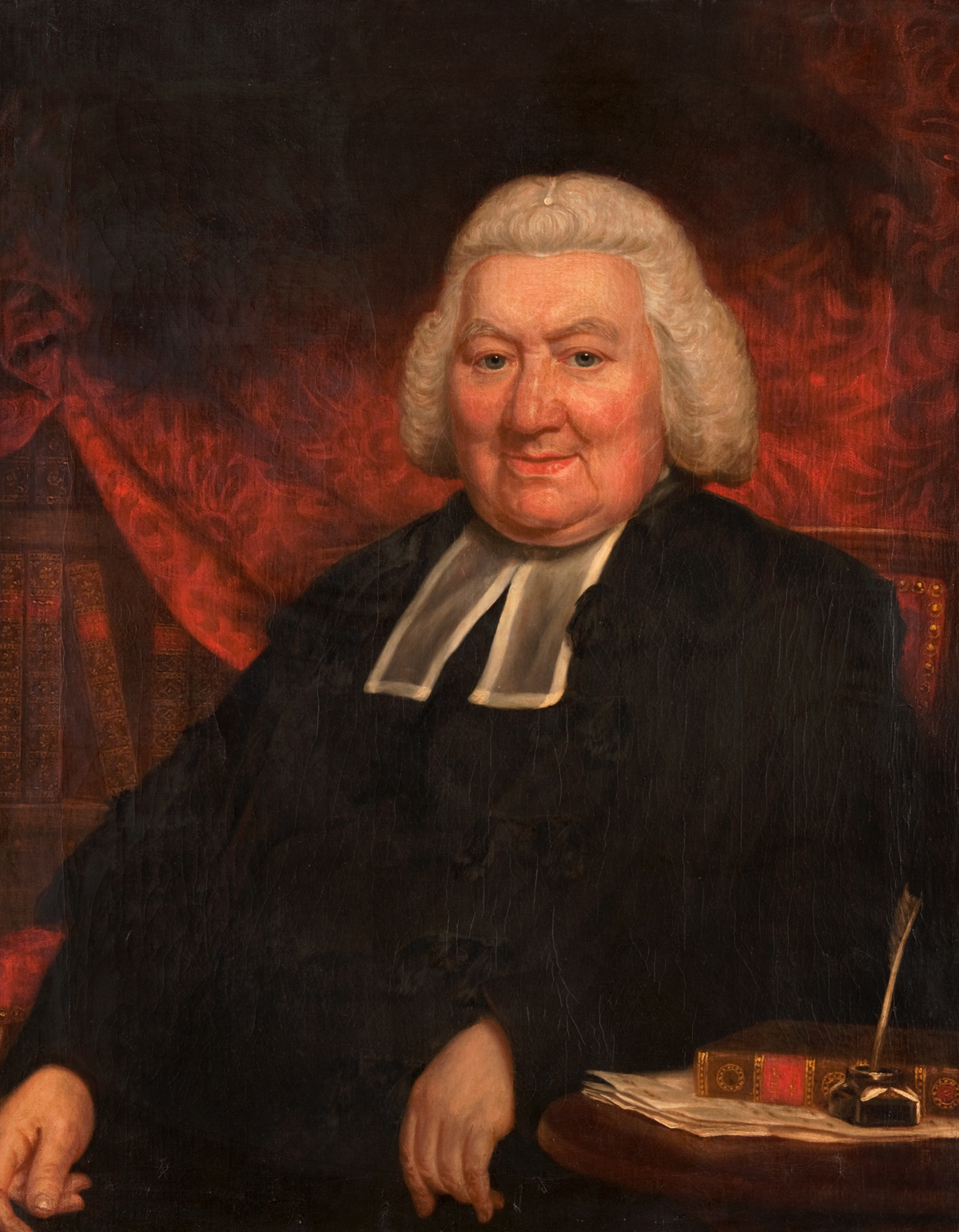
1807 painting in oils by Peter Paillou (the younger) of Professor of Divinity Robert Findlay (1721–1814). Hunterian Art Gallery.

The Gallery is now housed in a modern, custom-built facility that is part of the extensive Glasgow University Library complex, designed by William Whitfield. This displays the university's extensive art collection, and features an outdoor sculpture garden. The bas relief aluminium doors to the Hunterian Gallery were designed by sculptor Eduardo Paolozzi. The gallery's collection includes a large number of the works of James McNeill Whistler and the majority of the watercolours of Charles Rennie Mackintosh.

The Hunterian Art Gallery reopened in September 2012 after a refurbishment, with an exhibition dedicated to Rembrandt, Rembrandt and the Passion.

The gallery has held three major Mackintosh exhibitions: Architecture (2014), Travel Sketches (2015) and Unbuilt (2018), as well as two based on their Whistler collection Watercolours (2013) and Art and Legacy (2021).

=== The Mackintosh House ===
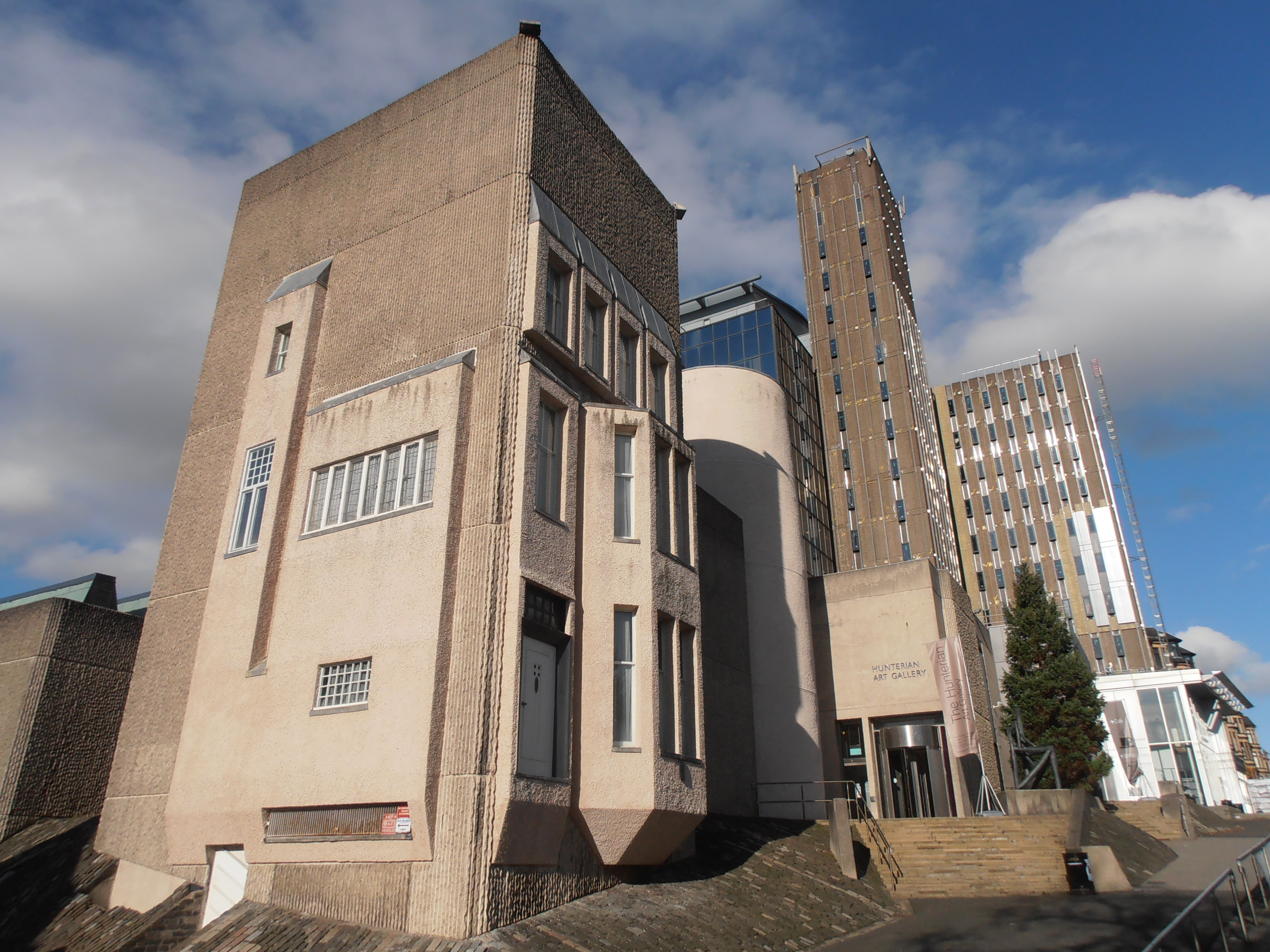
Mackintosh House, with Hunterian Art Gallery behind it.

The Mackintosh House is a modern concrete building, part of the gallery-library complex. It stands on the site of one of two rows of terraced houses which were once sections of Hillhead Street and Southpark Avenue, demolished in the 1960s to make room for the university's expansion across the residential crown of Gilmorehill. One of the buildings lost, 78 Southpark Avenue, was (between 1906 and 1914) the home of Glasgow architect Charles Rennie Mackintosh (although Mackintosh himself did not design it) and his wife, the artist, Margaret Macdonald Mackintosh.

The university rebuilt the form of the house (using modern materials) approximately 100 metres from the site of the original. Due to its displacement, the former front door is now located in the façade of the gallery, some distance above the ground over Hillhead Street. The Mackintosh House comprises the principal interiors of the original house (including the dining room, studio-drawing room and bedroom), largely replicating the room layout of the old end-of-terrace building. It features the meticulously reassembled interiors from the Mackintoshes' home, including items of original furniture, fitments and decorations. The exhibits strikingly demonstrate Charles Rennie Mackintosh's concept of the room as a work of art.

== Other Hunterian museums ==
William Hunter's brother John, a surgeon, also founded a museum; the London museum of the Royal College of Surgeons of England, also known as the Hunterian Museum, is based on his collection. The museum displays thousands of anatomical specimens, including the Evelyn tables and the skeleton of the "Irish giant" Charles Byrne, and many surgical instruments. It underwent a major refurbishment in 2003 and 2004, creating a new "crystal" gallery of steel and glass.

Both brothers were celebrated in the town of their birth, East Kilbride, at the small Hunter House Museum, later closed due to budget cuts.

== See also ==
- Glasgow Art
