= RV Lough Beltra =

Fishing trawler/research Vessel

History

Ireland
- Name: Lough Beltra
- Namesake: Lough Beltra
- Owner: Marine Institute
- Operator: Marine Institute
- Builder: Hakvoort Transport Shipping BV, Monnickendam
- Launched: 1973
- Identification: IMO number: 7314656

General characteristics
- Type: Fishing trawler / Research vessel
- Tonnage: 115 GT
- Displacement: 92.36 tons gross, 45.92 tons net
- Length: 64.3 ft (19.6 m)
- Beam: 19.9 ft (6.1 m)
- Draught: 10 ft (3.0 m)
- Propulsion: 425 hp (317 kW) marine Caterpillar engine
- Speed: 10 knots (19 km/h; 12 mph)
- Complement: 12 (4 crew, 8 researchers)

RV Lough Beltra was a trawler launched in 1973 and registered in Dublin. It was later refitted as a fisheries research vessel, performing this role from 1988 to 1997.

== History ==
From the late 1960s to the 1970s, government of Ireland operated two research vessels, Cú Feasa and Cú na Mara. Cú na Mara was sold after being damaged due to a fire in 1972, and Cú Feasa was in poor condition due to its age. The government of Ireland put plans in place in 1974 to secure two new research vessels. This was expected to be done within the following two years.

In 1976, Lough Beltra was purchased by the government of Ireland and refitted as a research vessel. It spent 4 1/2 years idle laid up in Howth harbour due to government cutbacks. Cú Feasa was taken out of service in 1976 due to poor condition, leaving Lough Beltra as the only remaining Irish research vessel.

In the aftermath of the Whiddy Island disaster in 1979, the Lough Bealtra was made available at short notice to survey the effects of the disaster on the marine environment in Bantry Bay. This involved making hydrographic and plankton surveys.

The vessel was formally handed over to the Department of the Marine on 21 March 1988. Its roles included fisheries, oceanographic, coastal, geographic, and environmental research, and acting as a training vessel for marine scientists. It was fully controlled from the bridge and fitted with modern equipment including a Decca auto pilot, track plotter, navigator and radar.

Between 1992 and 1994, the Lough Beltra received a £0.7 million upgrade, with 75% of the cost being funded by via the EU's STRIDE investment in regional research, technology and innovation, and the rest by the Irish government. This upgrade included structural alterations, the purchase of state-of-the-art sampling and monitoring equipment and a computerised data acquisition system.

In 1997, it was replaced by the RV Celtic Voyager, Ireland's first purpose-built research vessel.
