= Tuskar Rock, Ireland =

Rocks/island off County Wexford, Ireland

Tuskar Rock Lighthouse An Tuscar
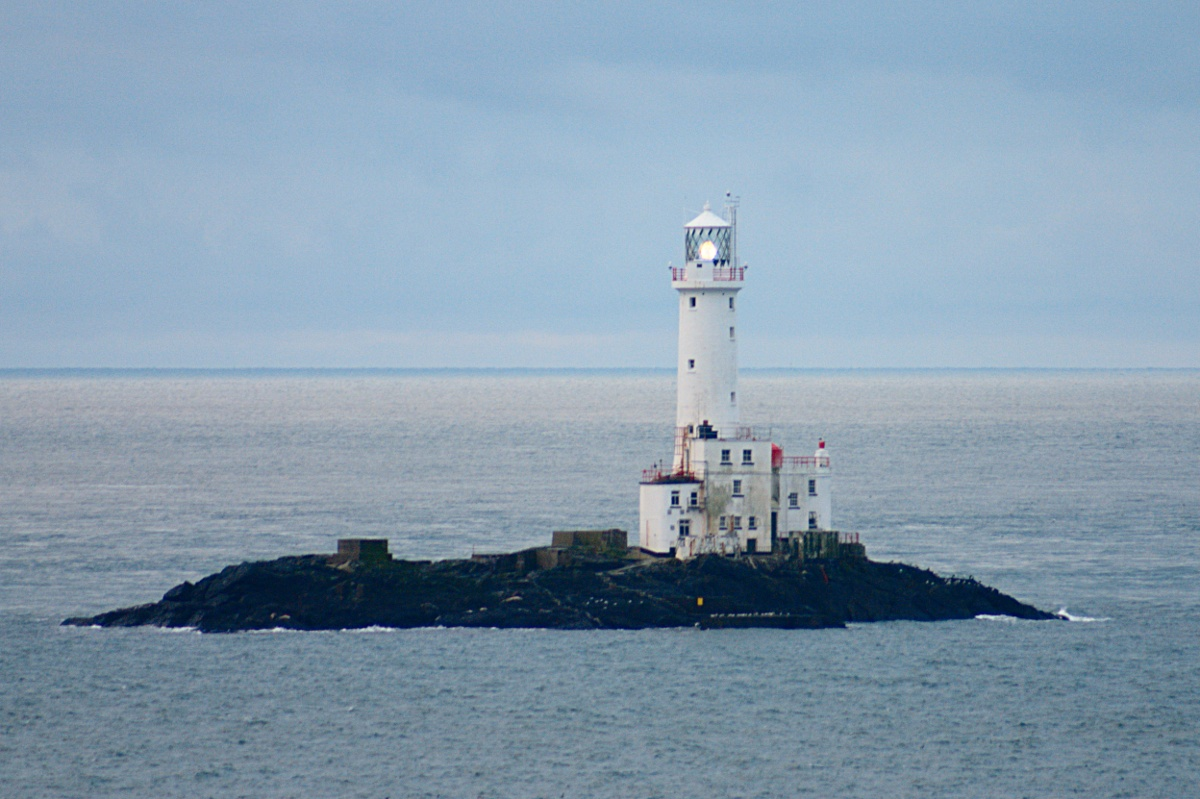
- Location: County Wexford
- Coordinates: 52°12.175′N 6°12.445′W

Tower
- Constructed: 1812–1815
- Construction: granite tower
- Automated: 31 March 1993
- Height: 34 metres (112 ft)
- Shape: cylindrical tower with balcony and lantern
- Markings: white tower and lantern, red lantern rail
- Racon: T

Light
- First lit: 1815
- Focal height: 33 metres (108 ft)
- Lens: Catoptric light (original), Chance Brothers 500 mm (20 in) annular lens (current)
- Intensity: 1 kilowatt lamp
- Range: 24 nmi (44 km)
- Characteristic: Q (2) W 7.5 s
- Ireland no.: CIL-0470

Tuskar Rock (Irish: An Tuscar) is a group of rocks topped by a lighthouse 11 kilometres (6 nautical miles) off the southeast coast of County Wexford, Ireland. The rocks have probably destroyed more ships than any other Irish coastal feature. One hundred and seventy-six wrecks are listed for the Tuskar Rock area at Irish Wrecks Online.

The Tuskar Rock lighthouse, built from granite and standing 37 metres (120 feet) tall, was built over a period of years beginning in 1812. In October of that year, a storm struck, washing away temporary barracks that had been erected on the island, and killing fourteen workmen—the worst such disaster in Ireland's history of lighthouse construction. The surviving workers clung to the island's slippery rocks for two full days before being discovered and rescued. Work resumed, and the lighthouse was completed, entering into operation on 4 June 1815.

The Tuskar Rock air disaster occurred near the rock on 24 March 1968 when Aer Lingus flight 712, en route from Cork to London, crashed into the sea with the loss of all 61 people on board.

The name Tuskar rock has no foundation in the Irish language but actually came from the Vikings. It is one of many Viking place names found in the south of Wexford and means simply large (tu) rock (skar) in Old Norse.

Tuskar lighthouse is mentioned in John Masefield's ballad The Yarn of the Loch Achray as the place where the clipper Loch Achray dropped her tug, before sailing to the South Atlantic where she was wrecked off the River Plate.

== Demographics ==
Historical population

| Year | Pop. | ±% |
|---|---|---|
| 1841 | 4 | — |
| 1851 | 7 | +75.0% |
| 1861 | 2 | −71.4% |
| 1871 | 6 | +200.0% |
| 1881 | 16 | +166.7% |
| 1891 | 3 | −81.2% |
| 1901 | 3 | +0.0% |
| 1911 | 4 | +33.3% |
| 1926 | 3 | −25.0% |
| 1936 | 3 | +0.0% |
| 1946 | 3 | +0.0% |
| 1951 | 6 | +100.0% |

| Year | Pop. | ±% |
|---|---|---|
| 1956 | 3 | −50.0% |
| 1961 | 6 | +100.0% |
| 1966 | 3 | −50.0% |
| 1971 | 3 | +0.0% |
| 1979 | 3 | +0.0% |
| 1981 | 3 | +0.0% |
| 1986 | 3 | +0.0% |
| 1991 | 5 | +66.7% |
| 1996 | 0 | −100.0% |
| 2002 | 0 | 0.00% |
| 2006 | 0 | 0.00% |

Source: Central Statistics Office. "CNA17: Population by Off Shore Island, Sex and Year". irishislands.info.

== See also ==
- List of islands of Ireland
- List of lighthouses in Ireland
- Coastal landforms of Ireland
- Commissioners of Irish Lights
