= Robert Arnot Staig =

Scottish entomologist and zoologist

Robert Arnot Staig FRSE (1878–1963) was a 20th-century Scottish entomologist and zoologist who served as Curator of the Hunterian Museum and Art Gallery in Glasgow University.

== Life ==
He was born in 1878, possibly the son of William Staig, a shipmaster, living at 165 Ferry Road in Leith.

He graduated MA in Science from Glasgow University around 1900 and began lecturing in Zoology in the university. He was Curator of the Hunterian collections from around 1905 to 1945.

In 1925 he was elected a Fellow of the Royal Society of Edinburgh. His proposers for the latter were Sir John Graham Kerr, Sir John Arthur Thomson, Frederick Orpen Bower, and John Walter Gregory.

He died on 19 March 1963.

== Family ==
In 1907 he married Mary Clapperton (d.1962).

== Publications ==
- The Nature Book
- The Fabrician Types of Insects in the Hunterian Collection at Glasgow University (1931)
- Catalogue of Greek Coins in the Hunterian Museum
