= Aquaculture (journal) =

- Discipline: Aquaculture
- Language: English

Publication details
- History: 1972–present
- Publisher: Elsevier
- Frequency: Weekly

Standard abbreviations
- ISO 4: Aquaculture

Indexing
- Aquaculture
- CODEN: AQCLAL
- ISSN: 0044-8486
- LCCN: 72625813
- OCLC no.: 01586829
- Annual Review of Fish Diseases
- CODEN: ARFDEN
- ISSN: 0959-8030 (print); 1879-1808 (web)
- LCCN: 91658573
- OCLC no.: 23862489

Links
- Journal homepage

Aquaculture is a peer-reviewed scientific journal covering research on aquaculture, published by Elsevier. It was established in 1972. The journal Annual Review of Fish Diseases, separately published from 1991 to 1996, was incorporated into Aquaculture following the cessation of its separate publication. Aquaculture is indexed by AGRICOLA, Animal Breeding Abstracts, Aquatic Sciences & Fisheries Abstracts, Biological Abstracts, BIOSIS Previews, CAB Abstracts, and Water Resources Abstracts.
