= Aer Lingus Flight 712 =

Flight from Cork to London which crashed in 1968

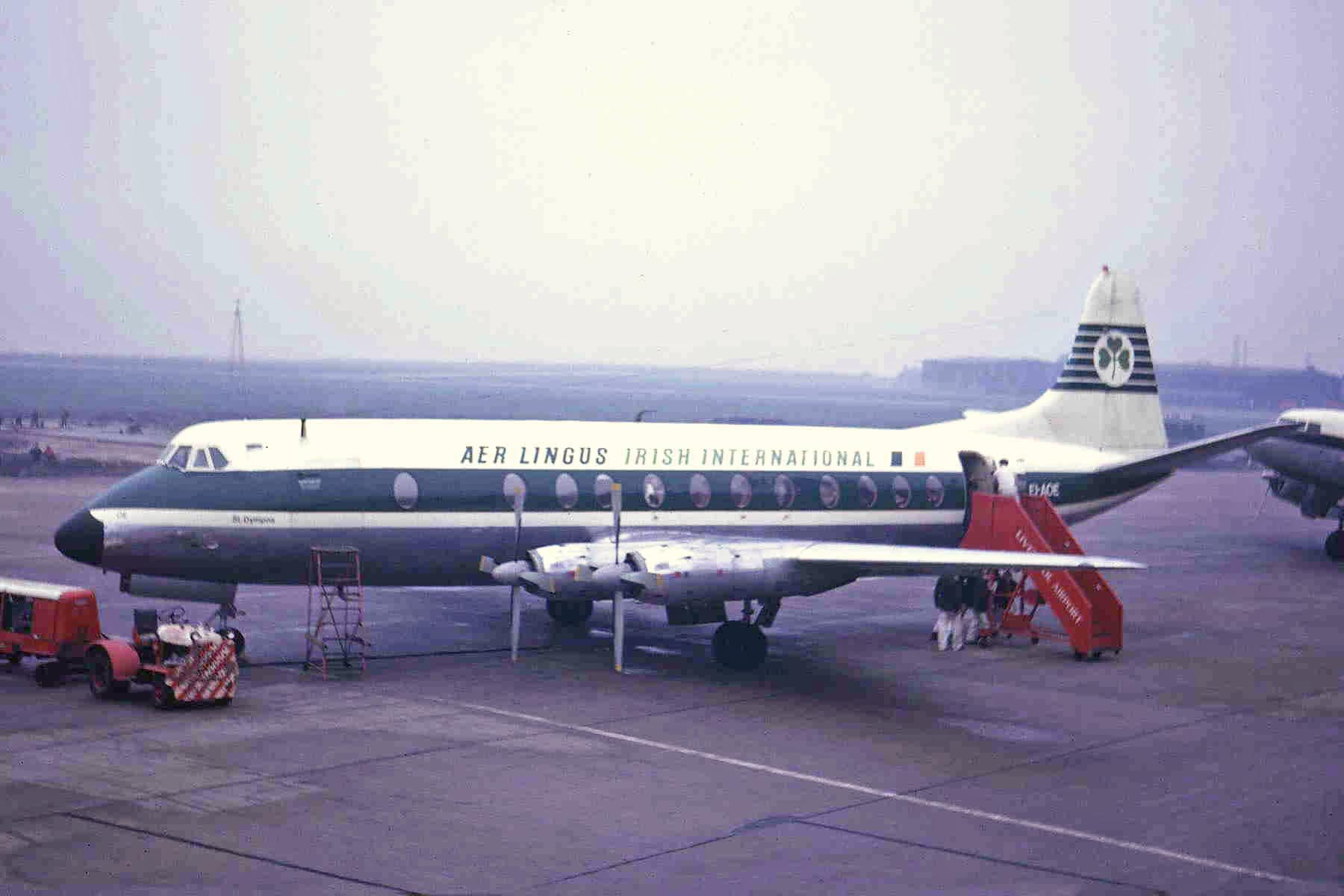
- An Aer Lingus Vickers Viscount, similar to the accident aircraft, in 1966

Accident
- Date: 24 March 1968
- Summary: In-flight structural failure of undetermined cause
- Site: St George's Channel, near Wexford, Ireland; 52.204290°N 6.253700°W

Aircraft
- Aircraft type: Vickers Viscount 803
- Operator: Aer Lingus
- Registration: EI-AOM
- Flight origin: Cork Airport
- Destination: Heathrow Airport
- Passengers: 57
- Crew: 4
- Fatalities: 61
- Survivors: 0

Aer Lingus Flight 712 crashed en route from Cork to London on 24 March 1968, killing all 61 passengers and crew. The aircraft, a Vickers Viscount 803 named St. Phelim, crashed into the sea off Tuskar Rock, County Wexford. Although the investigation into the crash lasted two years, a cause was never determined. Causes proposed in several investigative reports include possible impact with birds, a missile or target drone, or mechanical and structural failures.

== Crash ==
The flight left Cork Airport at 10.32 am for London Heathrow. It proceeded normally until a call was heard with the probable contents "twelve thousand feet descending spinning rapidly". There was no further communications with the aircraft, and London Air Traffic Control (ATC) informed Shannon ATC that they had no radio contact with the flight. London ATC requested Aer Lingus Flight EI 362 (flying Dublin–Bristol) to search west of Strumble. This search at 500 ft (150 m) in good visibility saw nothing. At 11.25 am a full alert was declared. By 12.36 pm there was a report of wreckage sighted at position 51°57′N, 6°10′W. Searching aircraft found nothing and the report cancelled. Aircraft and ships resumed the search the following day and "wreckage was sighted and bodies recovered" 6 nautical miles (11 km) north-east of Tuskar Rock with more wreckage scattered "for a further 6 nautical miles north-west".

Thirteen bodies were recovered over the next few days. Another body was recovered later. The main wreckage was located on the sea bed by trawling 1.72 nautical miles (3.19 km) from Tuskar Rock at 39 fathoms.

=== Aircraft ===
The aircraft was a Vickers Viscount 803 which flew under tail-number EI-AOM and had been in service since 1957 with a total of 18,806 lifetime flight hours. Aer Lingus operated approximately 20 Viscount aircraft in the 1950s and 1960s, of which two others were involved in serious incidents. The year before the Tuskar Rock crash, in June 1967, an 803 Viscount on a training flight crashed (due to a stall) with the loss of three crew lives. Also in 1967, in September, an 808 Viscount was damaged beyond repair during a crash landing (due to pilot error in fog) that caused no serious casualties.

=== Flight crew ===
The flight crew included Captain Bernard O'Beirne, 35, who had joined Aer Lingus after three years in the Air Corps. His total flying time was 6,683 hours, 1,679 of them on Viscounts. He was endorsed for command on Viscount aircraft and passed a medical examination in January 1968. The first officer was Paul Heffernan, 22, who had training with Airwork Services Training at Perth and joined Aer Lingus in 1966. That year, he received an Irish Commercial Pilots licence with Viscount endorsement and instrument rating. His total flying time was 1,139 hours, of which 900 was on Viscounts. The two stewardesses on board were Ann Kelly and Mary Coughlan.

=== Victims ===
Nationality	Total
Belgium	6
Ireland	33
Switzerland	9
Sweden	2
United Kingdom	5
United States	2

All 61 of the persons on board the aircraft, including national chess champion Noel Mulcahy, died. Only 14 bodies were recovered from the St George's Channel following the crash.

== Investigation ==
An investigation report was produced in 1970. A review was undertaken between 1998 and 2000. An independent study was commissioned in 2000.

== Cause ==
Of the several reports issued on the potential reasons for the crash, several causes were proposed. These included possible bird strike, corrosion or similar structural failure, or collision with a target drone or missile. The latter causes were based on the proximity of Aberporth in western Wales – at the time the most advanced missile testing station in Britain.

In the years following the crash, several witnesses came forward in support of the missile theory. These include a crew member of the British ship HMS Penelope who alleged that part of the recovered wreckage was removed to the UK.

However, in 2002, a review process conducted by the Air Accident Investigation Unit disclosed that Aer Lingus paperwork relating to a routine maintenance inspection carried out on the aircraft in December 1967 was found to be missing in 1968. Moreover, a large body of research was done by the investigators, after the accident, regarding the maintenance operating plan used for EI-AOM, and defects on the aircraft found during analysis of the maintenance records. This research was not referred to in the 1970 report. A new board of investigation was set up by the Irish Government and found that the crash was likely the consequence of a chain of events starting with a failure to the left tail-plane caused by metal fatigue, corrosion, flutter, or a bird strike, with the most likely cause being a flutter-induced fatigue failure of the elevator trim tab operating mechanism.

In March 2007, retired Royal Air Force Squadron Leader Eric Evers made an unsupported claim that the accident was caused by a mid-air collision between the Aer Lingus Vickers Viscount and a French-built military aircraft which was training with the Irish Air Corps. Evers maintained that he had evidence that a Fouga Magister trainer accidentally collided with the Aer Lingus aircraft as it was checking the status of the Viscount's undercarriage, which he claimed had failed to lock in position correctly. According to Evers, the Magister's two pilots survived by ejecting and parachuting to safety; however, Magisters do not have ejector seats. Evers' claims, including that French and Irish authorities colluded in a cover-up, have been strongly refuted by other commentators. For example, Mike Reynolds, an aviator and author of Tragedy at Tuskar Rock, disputed Evers' claims and supports the findings of the 2002 French/Australian investigation – which ruled-out an impact with another aircraft or missile. This study, on which Reynolds worked as Irish assistant, concluded that the cause may have been as a result of structural failure of the aircraft, corrosion, metal fatigue, flutter, or bird strike. An Irish Defence Forces spokesman similarly described the Evers claims as "spurious", noting that there was no evidence that an Irish Air Corps plane was in the vicinity at the time, and that Magisters did not actually enter service with the Irish Air Corps until 1976.

== Legacy ==
A memorial park was opened in August 2006 in the centre of Rosslare Harbour village. It was organised and paid for by the local Rosslare Harbour/Kilrane Environment Group, who spent €90,000, consisting of two amounts of €25,000 from each of The Wexford Organisation for Rural Development (WORD) and Wexford County Council with the local Environment Group raising the balance. The park features a stone centerpiece sculpted by Niall Deacon of Enniscorthy that is set in water with three panels signifying the portholes of the Viscount in descent, and a chain with 61 links representing the lives lost.

Aer Lingus continued to use the flight number "EI 712" for the flight route from Cork to London Heathrow. In March 2024, following a request from the son of one of the crash victims, the airline changed the flight number to "EI 714".

== See also ==
- Manx2 Flight 7100, a 2011 crash that was the deadliest Irish aviation incident since Aer Lingus Flight 712
