= Violet Mary =

Violet Mary may refer to:

- Violet Crowther (1884–1969), British museum curator
- Violet Mary Doudney (1889–1952), teacher and militant suffragette
- Violet Mary Craig Roberton (1888–1954), Scottish politician and local councillor
