= Fairfield Offices =

Fairfield Heritage Centre
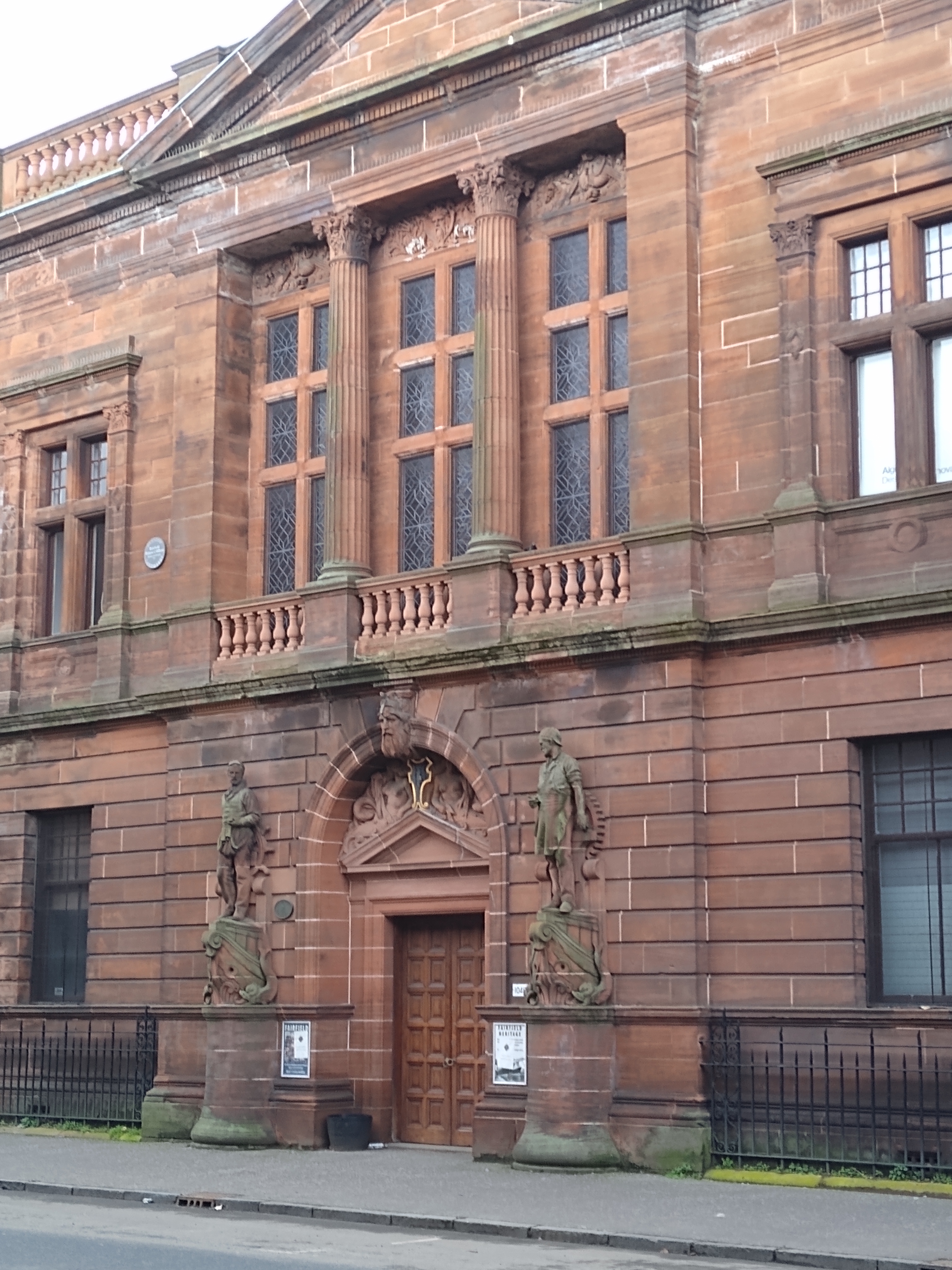
- Fairfield Offices main entrance on Govan Road
- Interactive map of the Fairfield Heritage Centre area

General information
- Type: Shipyard drawing office
- Architectural style: Italian Renaiassance Revival
- Location: 1048 Govan Road; G51 4XS, Glasgow, Scotland
- Construction started: 1888
- Completed: 1891
- Renovated: 2013
- Renovation cost: £5.8 million
- Client: Fairfield Shipbuilding and Engineering Company
- Owner: Govan Workspace Ltd.

Design and construction
- Architect: John Keppie
- Architecture firm: Honeyman and Keppie
- Developer: Sir William Pearce, 1st Baronet
- Other designers: Charles Rennie Mackintosh (assistant); James Pittendrigh Macgillivray (sculptor)

Renovating team
- Architect: Page\Park Architects

Other information
- Public transit access: Govan

Website
- Fairfield Heritage Centre

Listed Building – Category A
- Designated: 15 December 1970
- Reference no.: LB33356

The Fairfield Heritage Centre is situated on Govan Road, Glasgow, Scotland. Built as the offices of the Fairfield Shipbuilding and Engineering Company between 1889 and 1891 the building was used as the principal offices for successive owners of the adjacent shipyard until 2001, when it was vacated by BAE Systems Marine. After deteriorating unused for eight years it was bought by social enterprise charity Govan Workspace in 2009. Following a restoration costing over £5.8m it was re-occupied as a heritage centre and commercial offices in 2013.

== Heritage Centre and Offices ==
The Fairfield Heritage Centre includes the former boardroom, management offices and directors dining room as well as the main entrance and lobby. 18,000 sq. m of modern office suites are located in the former drawing offices on the first floor and the former counting house on the ground floor.

The heritage area, which is free to visit 7 days 1pm to 4pm, tells the story of over 150 years of shipbuilding at the yard using artefacts, graphic panels, interactive media and audio-visual presentations. Exhibits and information address technical innovation with the pioneering development of the compound steam engine, the period of building passenger liners to contest the Blue Riband for fastest transatlantic crossing, the two world wars, the 1960s Fairfield Experiment in management/labour relations and the Upper Clyde Shipbuilders, Govan Shipbuilders, Kvaerner Govan and BAE Systems eras. In 2006, BAE Systems launched the 750th vessel to be built at Fairfield. The shipyard was originally built on the former Fairfield farm between 1864 and 1871.

It is situated on Govan Road, Glasgow, opposite Elder Park, 200 metres west of the Pearce Institute and 300 metres west of Govan subway station and bus interchange.

== History ==
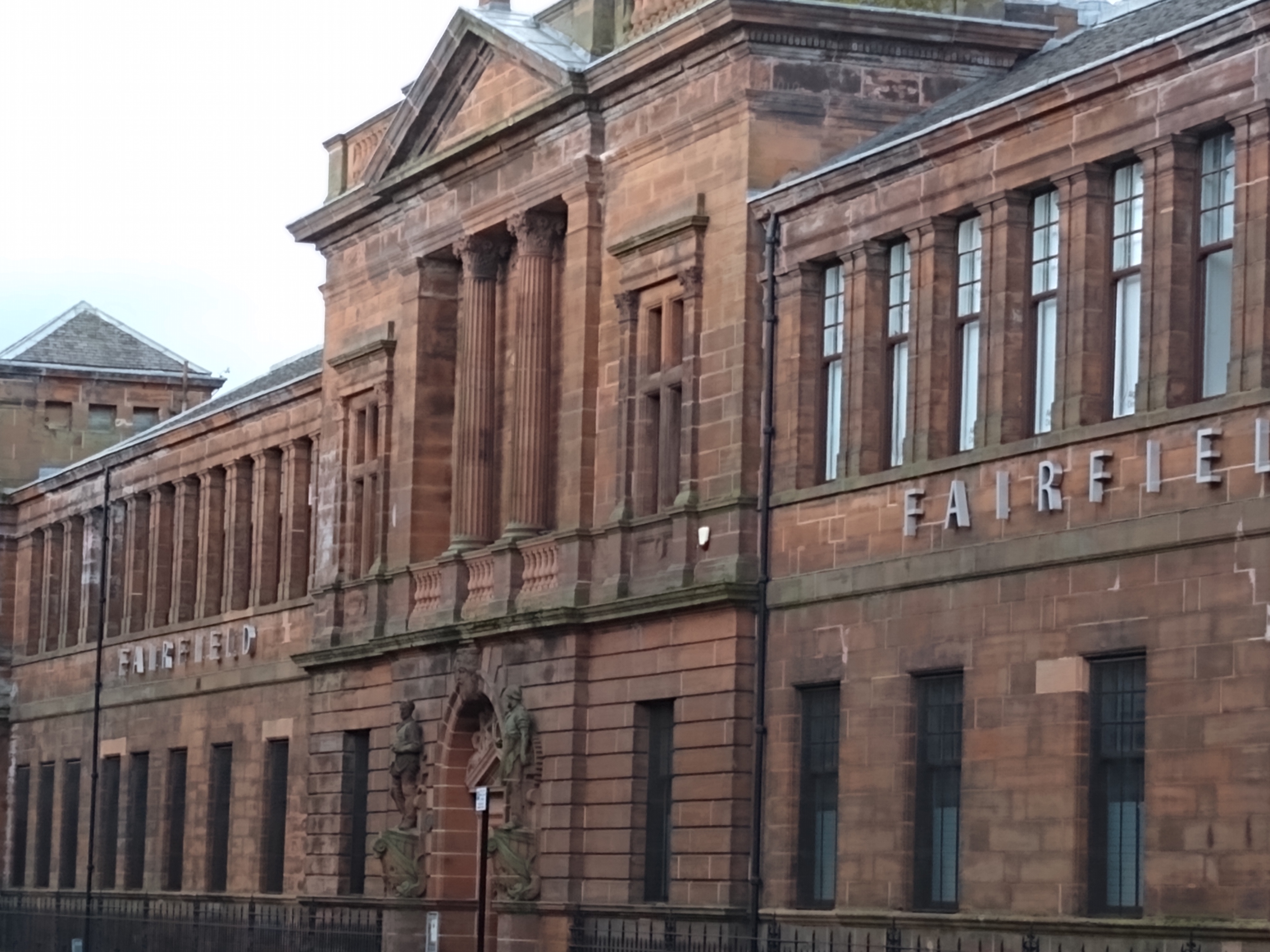
The red sandstone offices present an imposing frontage to Govan Road

It was built for the Fairfield Shipbuilding and Engineering Co. Ltd. At the time it was built, the company was one of the leading shipbuilding yards on the River Clyde and this was reflected in a prominent exhibition stand in the Main Hall at the first Glasgow Exhibition in 1888. Amongst the early special events held in the offices were the launch parties for the Cunard liners Campania and Lucania in 1892 and 1893.

It was designed by Honeyman and Keppie, an architectural practice which was then at 140 Bath Street, Glasgow and which survives as Keppie Design and is now headquartered in 160 West Regent Street, Glasgow in the former John Ross Memorial Church. John Keppie is thought to have been the lead designer of the building. Charles Rennie Mackintosh was a junior member of staff at the firm from 1888 and is thought to have worked on the project.

The driving force behind the business at that time and probably the initial advocate for commissioning the new offices was Sir William Pearce whose painting hangs in the boardroom and who was sole owner of the business from 1878 and was elected as the first Member of Parliament for the new Govan constituency in 1886 but who died before the building was completed. The name of the company was changed from Randolph Elder and Co. to Fairfield Shipbuilding and Engineering Co. Ltd. in 1885 by Pearce. it was named after the former farm that he had redeveloped as an integrated shipyard and engine works in order to be able to bid for naval orders.

Sir William Pearce was a philanthropist who paid for the nearby Pearce Institute. Isabella Elder, the former owner of the yard and widow of former owner John Elder was also philanthropic and commissioned the nearby Elder Park which was originally laid out to a scheme by John Honeyman.

The building was planned to be both functional and to impress visiting clients and potential clients. It includes many Italianate and Beaux Arts elements. There are also Art Deco features which would have been added later. As a functioning hub of the business it included large, light spaces for the draughtsmen working on both shipbuilding and engineering drawings. The building is protected by a Category A listing. John Keppie studied in Paris with the academic atelier architect Jean Louis-Pascal during the 1880s. Although it was probably Honeyman who secured the commission as he had benefitted previously from the patronage of John and Isabella Elder the project was led by Keppie. Its external features include figures of a shipwright and an engineer sculpted above the main entrance. These were by Glasgow-based sculptor James Pittendreigh Macgillivray who also collaborated with Keppie on other work.
