= Cramb =

Cramb is a Scottish surname. Notable people with this surname include:

- Colin Cramb (born 1974), Scottish football player and coach
- Fay Cramb, also known as Valmae beck, involved in the murder of Sian Kingi
- John Adam Cramb (1862–1913), Scottish historian
- Richard Cramb (1963–2025), Scottish rugby union player
