= Elder Park, Govan =

Public park in Glasgow, Scotland

Elder Park
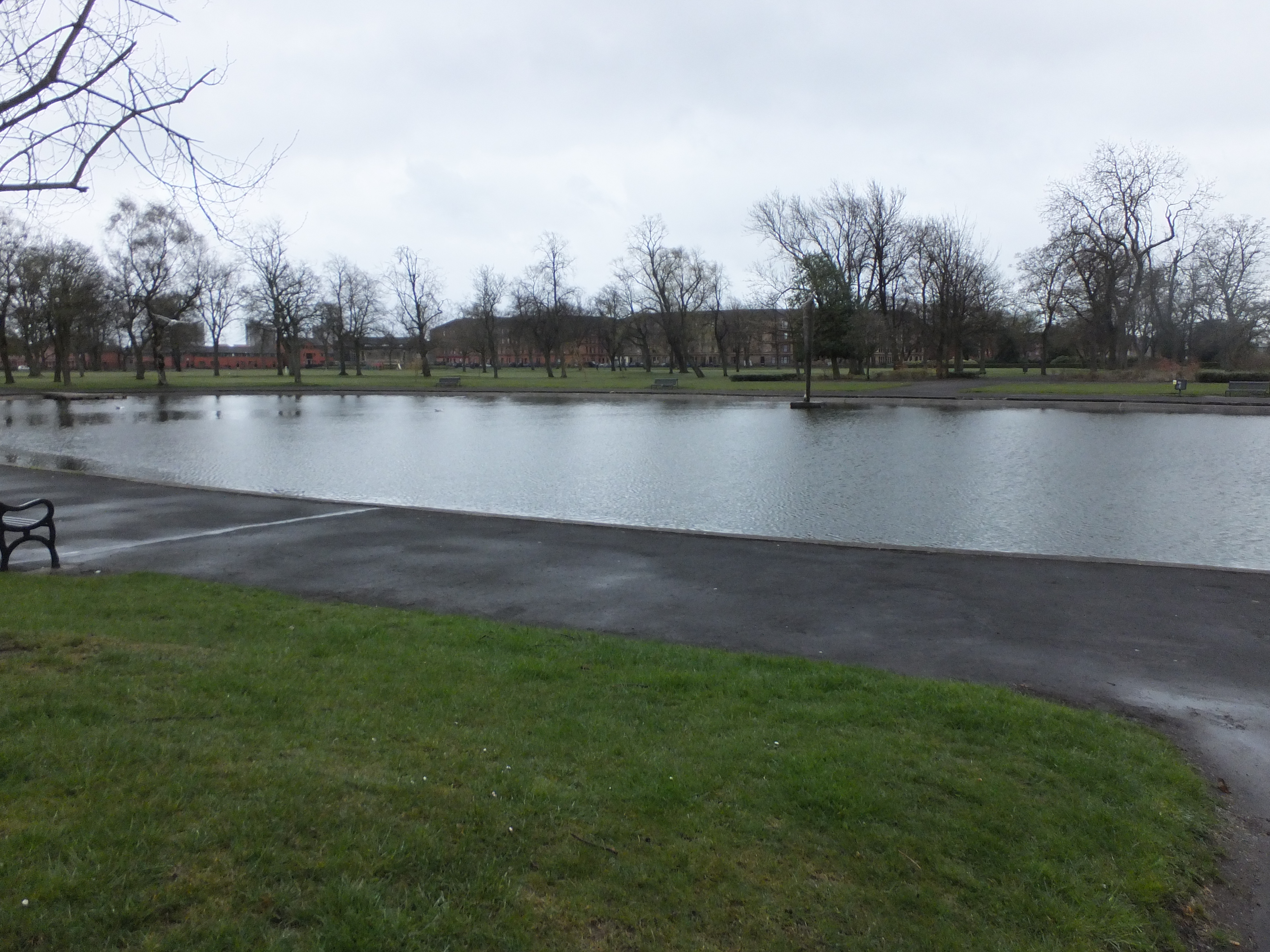
- Interactive map of Elder Park
- Type: Public park
- Location: Glasgow, Scotland
- Coordinates: 55°51′45.45″N 4°19′30.61″W
- Area: 37 acres (15 ha)
- Created: 1885; 141 years ago
- Operator: Glasgow City Council
- Status: Open all year
- Public transit: Govan subway station

Elder Park is a public park in the Govan area of Glasgow, Scotland, located a short distance south of the River Clyde, to the east of the Linthouse neighbourhood. It contains Elder Park Library, a boating pond, the original Fairfield farmhouse, and Linthouse Mansion portico.

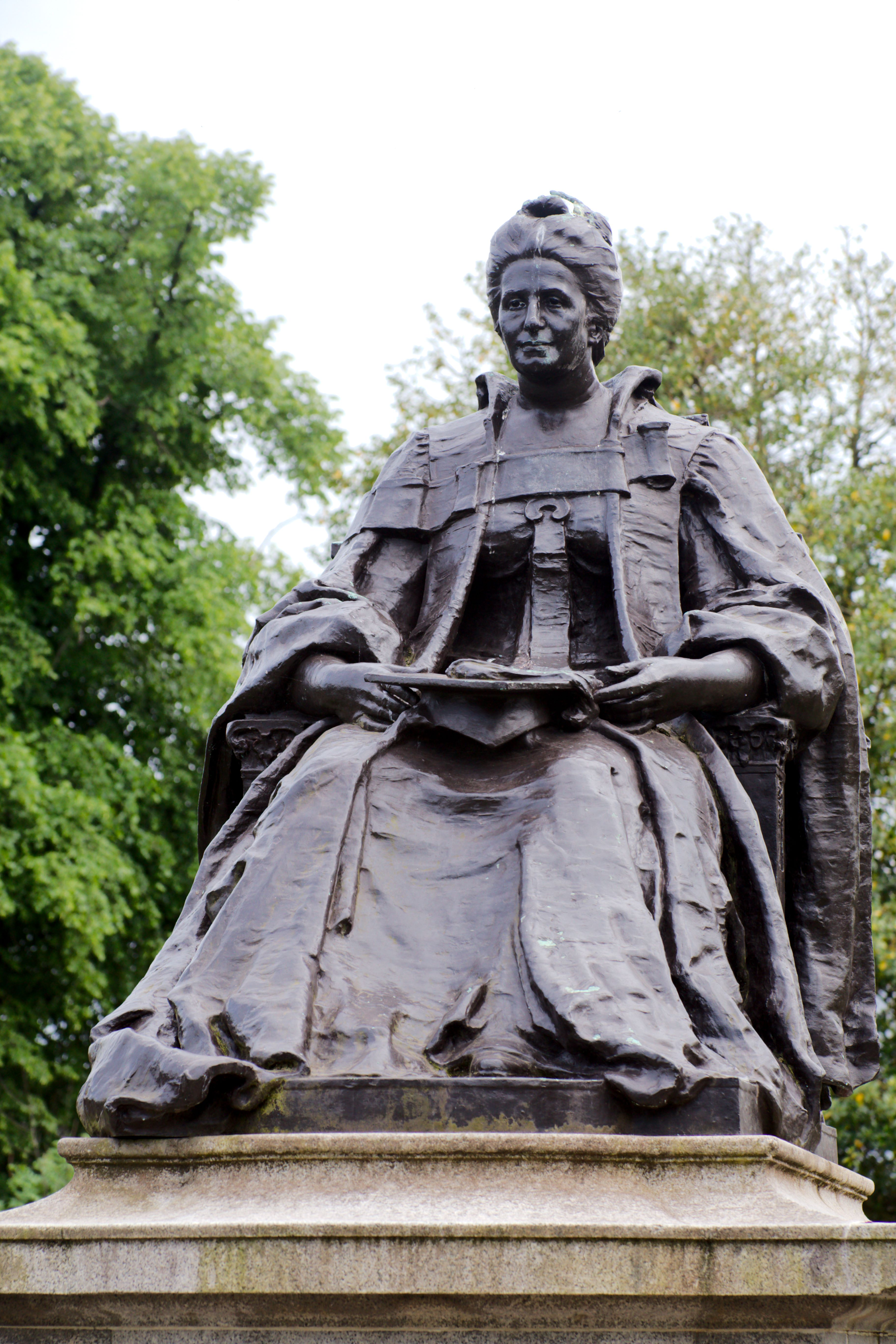
Statue of Isabella Elder in Elder Park.

== History ==
The park was given to the people of Govan in 1885 by Isabella Elder, in memory of her husband, the shipbuilding magnate John Elder. It was created on the site of Fairfield farm, the farmhouse of which still stands. The headquarters of the family's Fairfield Shipbuilding and Engineering Company were directly opposite the park to the north on Govan Road – the buildings still exist as the Fairfield Heritage Centre. Elder gifted the park for "healthful recreation by music and amusement".

The park's sandstone entrance gates were refurbished during 2021, with a small ceremony taking place at the conclusion of the project in February 2022.

== Buildings ==
Elder Park Library lies at the south-eastern end of the park, on Langlands Road. It was opened in September 1903 by Andrew Carnegie, gifted to the people of Glasgow by Isabella Elder, and designed by John James Burnett. It is a Category A listed building.

The Linthouse Mansion was built in 1791, however the only remaining part of the house now is the portico.

== Statues and memorials ==
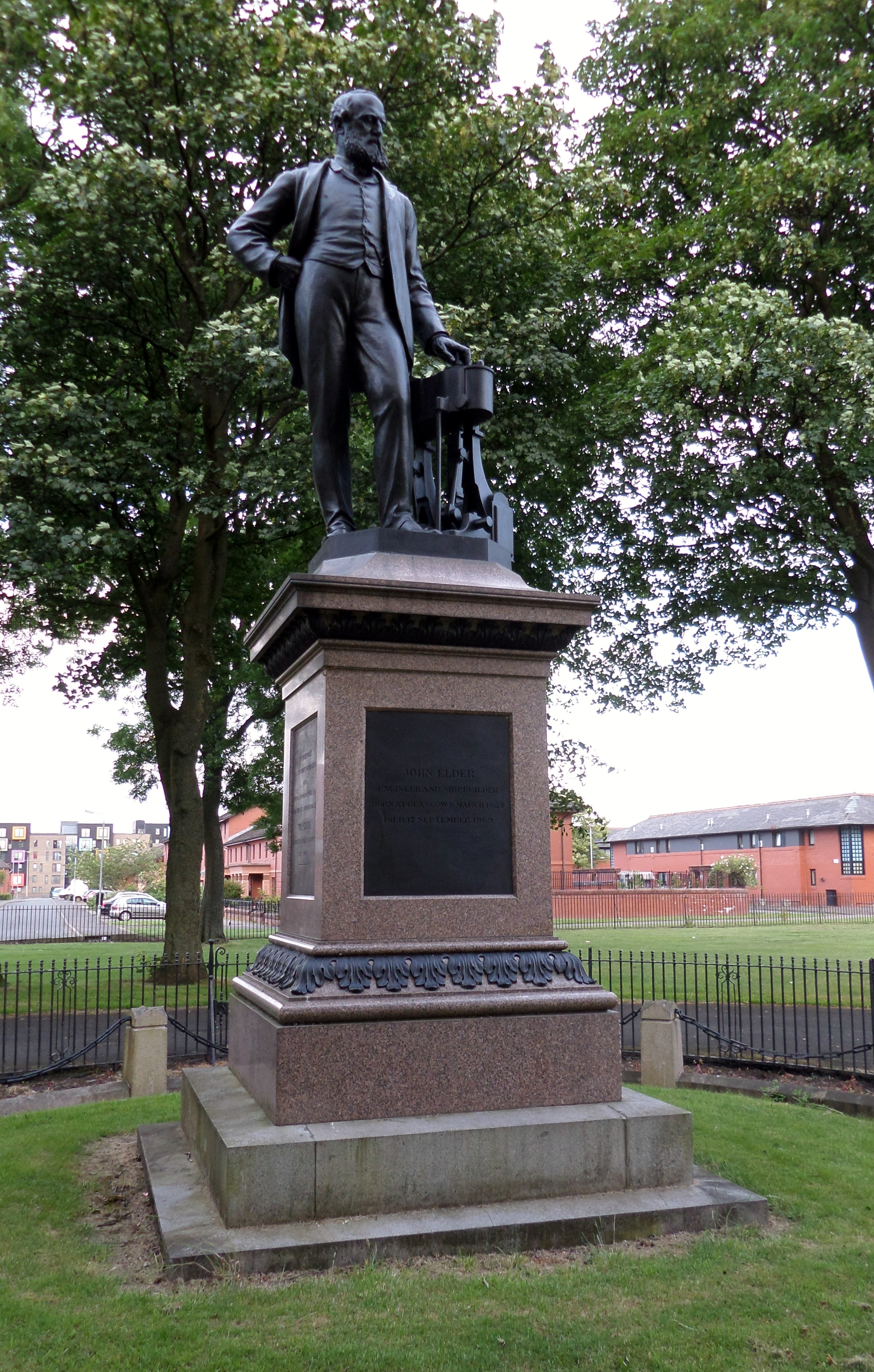
Statue of John Elder

There are two statues within the park, one to Isabella Elder (Sir J. E. Boehm, 1906, Category A listed), and one to her husband John Elder (Archibald Shannan, 1888, Category B listed). There are also two memorials, commemorating the SS Daphne disaster in 1883 and the HMS K13 submarine disaster in 1917, both of which involved the death of local shipyard workers (from Stephens and Fairfields respectively).

== See also ==
- List of Category A listed buildings in Glasgow
