= St Mungo Prize =

Humanitarian and service award

The St Mungo Prize is a prize awarded triennially to the person who has done most to improve and promote the city of Glasgow.

The full text of the conditions for the prize states that it is to be awarded to the person "deemed to have done most in the previous three years by way of action, instruction or suggestion: to beautify the city, to increase the well-being of the citizens, to purify the atmosphere, to foster better relations between all classes, to extend cultural and educational development, and to bring Glasgow into honourable prominence".

The prize consists of a gold medal and £1,000, with the prize funded by a £13,500 trust fund established in 1936 by an anonymous donor. The Glaswegian shoe manufacturer and artist Alexander Patterson Somerville was revealed to have been the anonymous donor upon his death in 1949.

== List of winners ==
- Lord Provost Patrick Dollan (1940)
- Tom Honeyman (1943)
- Sir William Burrell (1946)
- Sir Stephen Bilsland (1949)
- Violet Mary Craig Roberton (1952)
- Evelyn MacKenzie Anderson (1955)
- John D Kelly (1958)
- Nevile Davidson (1961)
- Tom Allan (1964)
- Ferguson Anderson (1967)
- Sir Alexander Gibson (1970)
- Arthur Oldham (1973)
- Sir Samuel Curran (1976)
- Dorothy Henderson (1979)
- Fred Paton (1982)
- Gavin Arneil (1985)
- Jack House (1988)
- Susan Baird (1991)
- Giles Havergal (1994)
- George Parsonage (1997)
- Sheila Halley (2002)
- Lord Macfarlane of Bearsden (2004)
- Willie Haughey (2007)
- John Arbuthnott (2010)
- Iain MacRitchie (2016)
