= Janet Anne Galloway =

Scottish advocate for higher education for women

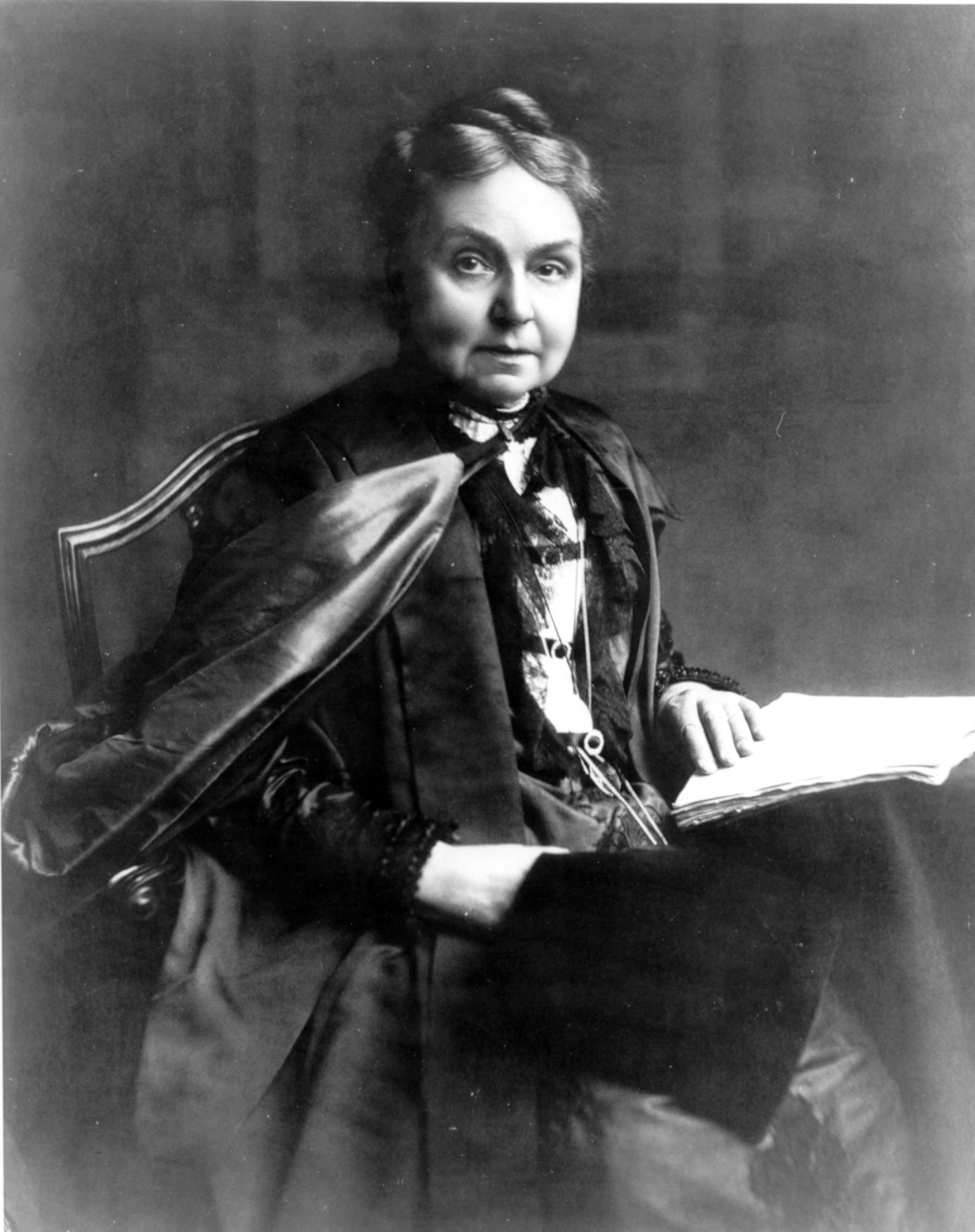
Janet Anne Galloway

Janet Anne Galloway (1841–1909) was an advocate for higher education for women in Scotland, supporter of the Glasgow Association for the Higher Education of Women and secretary of Queen Margaret College.

== Early life ==
Janet Anne Galloway was born in Birdston, Stirlingshire, Scotland on 10 October 1841, the only surviving daughter of the four children born to Anne Bald and Alexander Galloway (1802–1883) a land surveyor and estate factor. She moved with her family to Glasgow in 1844, where her father worked as a land agent, valuer, and accountant.

== Education ==
Galloway was initially educated in Scotland, before attending schools in France, Germany, and Netherlands where she learned to speak French and German fluently. She also developed an interest in history and archaeology and was taught bookkeeping and business methods by her father. She was known to be an accomplished pianist with an enduring love for music.

== Glasgow Association for the Higher Education of Women ==
As a result of the limited educational opportunities open to women, Galloway became an active supporter of the movement for higher education provision for women. In 1877, she was appointed as the honorary secretary of the new Glasgow Association for the Higher Education of Women. The Association had been founded by Jessie Campbell and financed by Isabella Elder. John Caird, principal of the University of Glasgow at the time, was the first Chairman of its General Committee. Galloway was responsible for recruiting teachers lecturers and examiners, and helped to develop and plan teaching methods and standards.

== Queen Margaret College ==
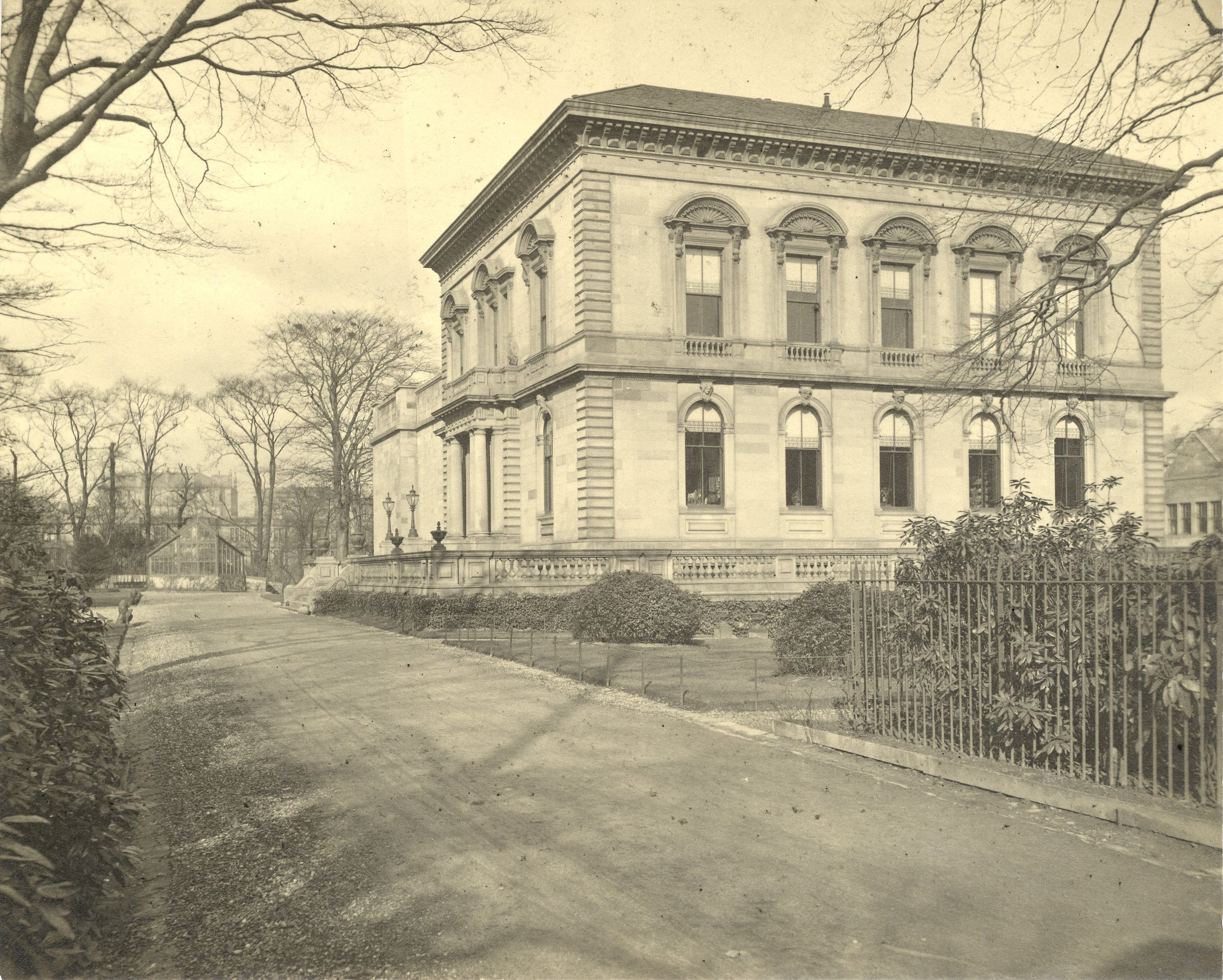
Queen Margaret College, North Park House

The Glasgow Association for the Higher Education of Women was incorporated into Queen Margaret College in 1883. The college opened in 1884 in North Park House, Glasgow, a merchants' mansion acquired by Isabella Elder and gifted to the college. Galloway was the first secretary of the college, though she refused to accept any remuneration for her duties. Following her father's death in 1833, Galloway moved into the college premises at North Park House.

== University of Glasgow ==
Queen Margaret College became part of the University of Glasgow in 1892, following the Scottish Universities Commissioners ordinance to empower Scottish Universities to provide instruction for women and enable them to graduate. At this point Galloway became an officer of the university, though she continued to decline payment for her services. She took a keen interest in the pastoral life of the university's female students; she organised social events and gatherings, encouraged the formation of societies and unions, and followed their careers after they graduated. In 1885, she was one of the founders of the Queen Margaret Guild, an organisation that arranged talks for the university extension movement. In 1894, she helped found the student residence Queen Margaret Hall. She also helped to establish a women graduates association and was an active member of the executive committee of the Queen Margaret Settlement Association, which was part of the social reform settlement movement established in the 1880s. In 1893, Galloway was invited to the Chicago Great Exhibition as a representative of Queen Margaret College.

In 1907, Galloway was awarded an Honorary LLD by the University of Glasgow in recognition of her lifelong dedication to the higher education of women

== Politics and religion ==
Galloway was a political Conservative who opposed both women's suffrage and the employment of female lecturers. She initially believed that Queen Margaret College should educate women in their traditional roles, rather than equip them to enter men's professions. Although she was an advocate of single sex education she also campaigned throughout her life to open universities to women.

Galloway was baptized within the Church of Scotland but became a devoted member of the Scottish Episcopal Church, attending St Mary's Cathedral, Glasgow.

== Death and memorial ==
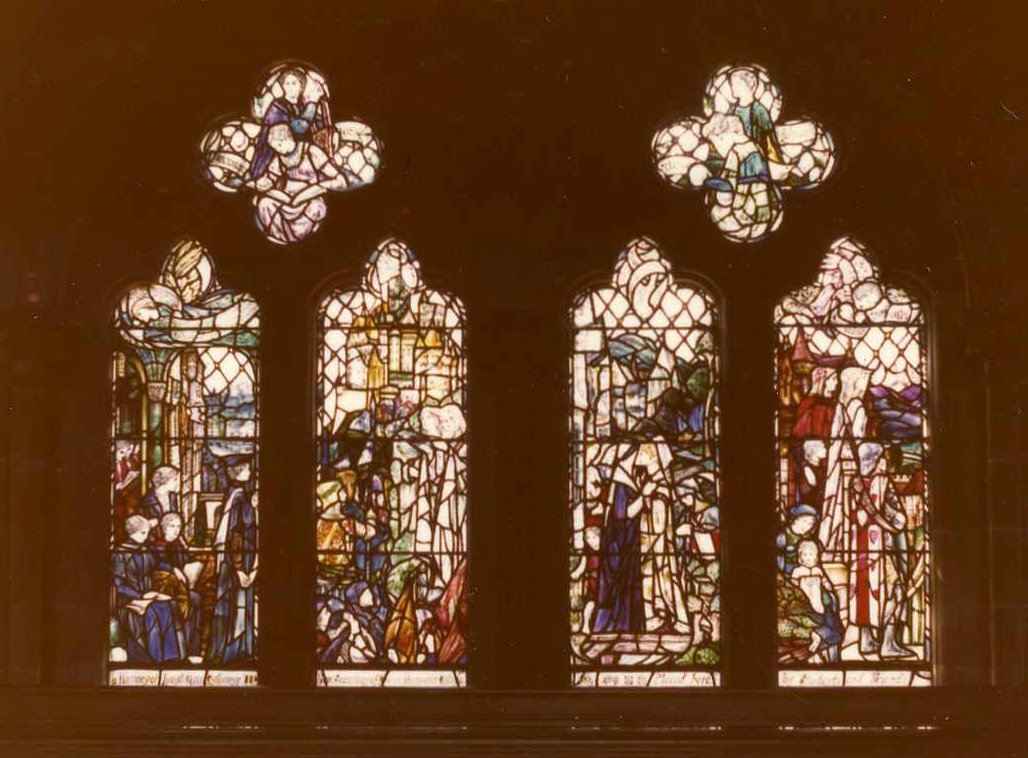
Janet Galloway Memorial Window, Bute Hall, University of Glasgow

Galloway, who remained unmarried, continued working up until her unexpected death on 23 January 1909. She died at her home on Queen Margaret Drive, Glasgow. After a grand funeral in the Bute Hall of the University of Glasgow, Galloway was buried in the Campsie Churchyard, Lennoxtown.

Following her death, a fund was raised for a memorial window in the Bute Hall: the Janet Galloway Memorial Window, titled The Pursuit of Ideal Education, pictures Janet alongside Isabella Elder and Jessie Campbell.

A former student remembered Galloway as being:

"never too busy to see a student, advised as to courses and future careers, encouraged the ambitious, scolded the frivolous, found friends for the solitary, secured posts for those who were ready for them, and smoothed untrodden paths for many a diffident beginner".

Galloway was succeeded by Frances Melville, who became the Mistress of the college and remained as such until the college's closure in 1935.
