= Marjorie Rackstraw =

Educationist and social worker (1888–1981)

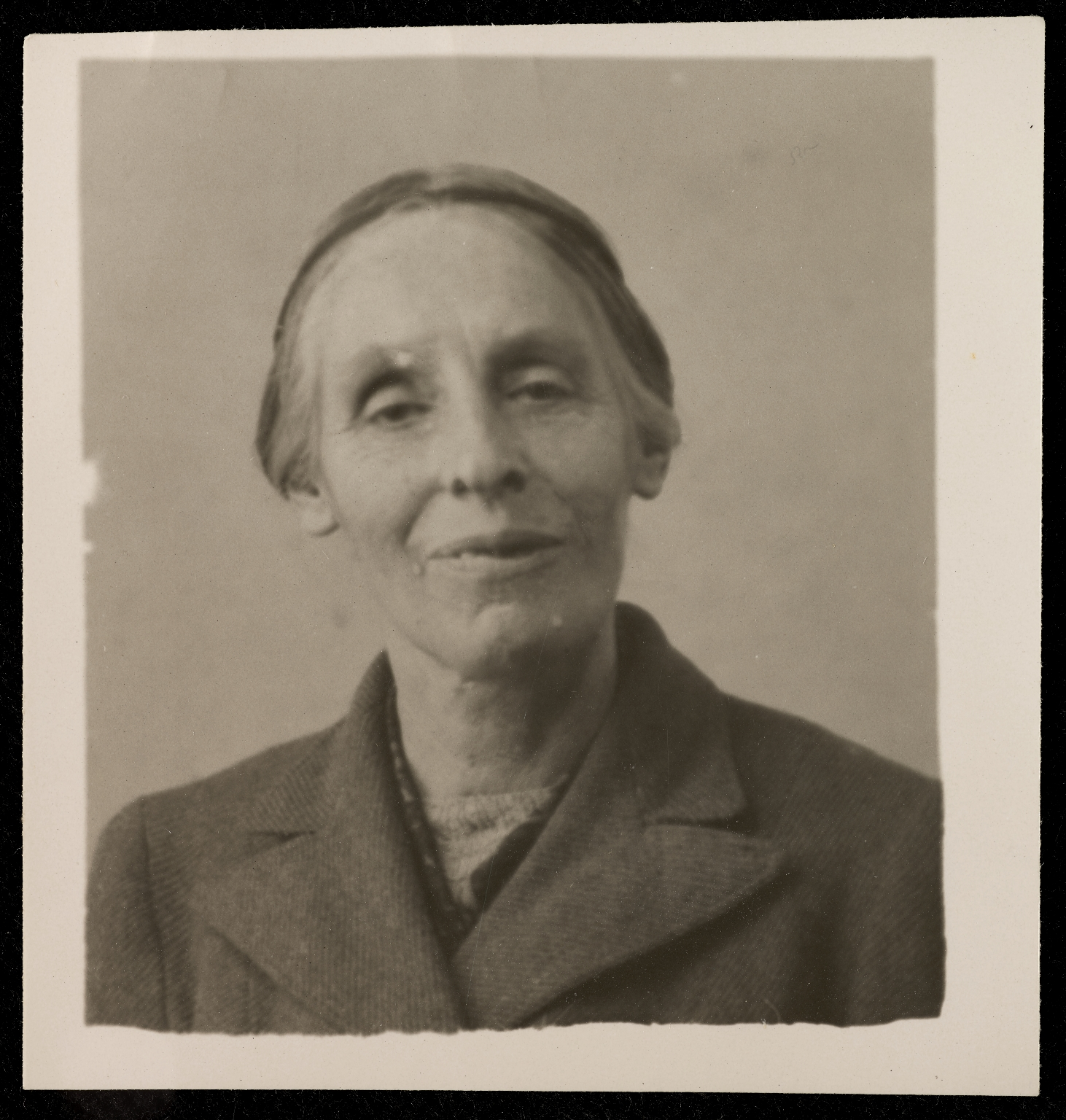
- Born: 24 June 1888; Highgate, Middlesex, England
- Died: 28 April 1981 (aged 92); Keats Grove, Hampstead, England
- Occupation(s): Educationist and social worker

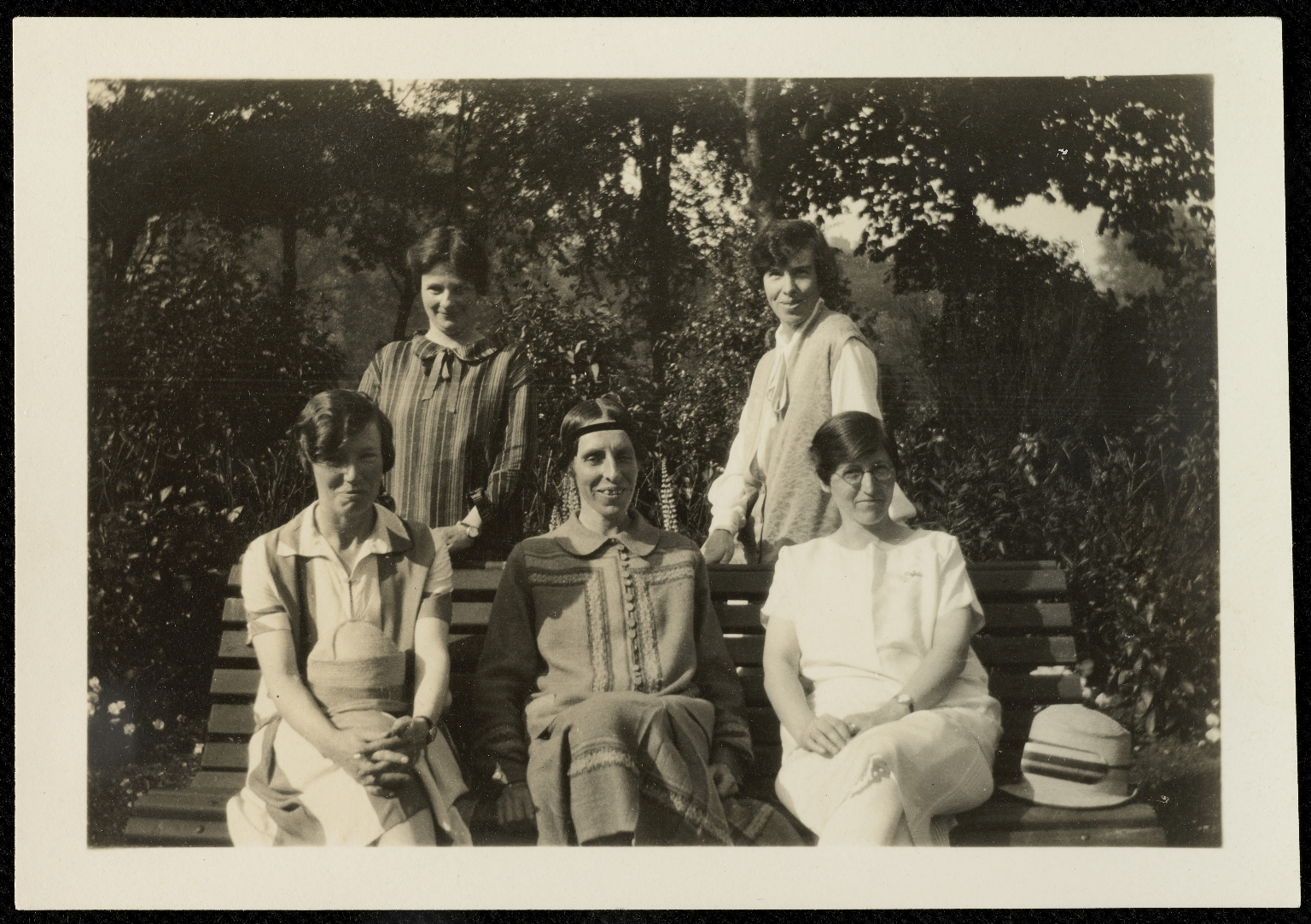
Group photograph of Marjorie Rackstraw with four other women

Marjorie Rackstraw (24 June 1888 – 28 April 1981) was an educationalist and social worker. She was a lifelong friend of the prison reformer Margery Fry, Labour Councillor for Hampstead in London, and undertook significant relief work before, during and after the Second World War.

Some time after graduating with an arts degree from the University of Birmingham, Marjorie worked as a lecturer in education at the University of Sheffield for several years. She was appointed warden of Masson Hall, University of Edinburgh, in 1924 and General Advisor to Women Students at the university in 1927.

== Early life ==
Marjorie was born in Highgate, Middlesex on 24 June 1888 to Matthew and Fanny Rackstraw (née Blofeld), the second out of five children. Her father was a tradesman who owned two shops on Upper Street, Islington, and her mother's family were dealers in Smithfield. The family lived in a large house in Cholmondeley Park until their children left home.

As a young girl, Marjorie attended Grove School, Highgate, but transferred to a school for disabled children at Margate after developing spinal problems, possibly resulting from polio. She continued to suffer from spinal troubles throughout her life.

== Education ==
After a year in France, Marjorie went on to study for an undifferentiated arts degree at the University of Birmingham. It was during her time at Birmingham that she met Margery Fry, who was then warden of University House. After her time at Birmingham she spent a year at Bryn Mawr College, Pennsylvania.

== Career ==
Marjorie eventually returned to Birmingham to assist Margery Fry at University House. When the older Margery left to work with the Friends' War Victims Relief Committee, Marjorie followed in her footsteps and began working with refugees on the Marne. In 1920, Marjorie's relief work took her to Russia, where she worked through the famine. In her autobiography, Unfinished Adventure: Selected Reminiscences from an Englishwoman's Life (1933), suffragist Evelyn Sharp describes Marjorie as fluent in Russian, efficient, and possessing "the sympathetic temperament of a leader" which led her to being "very popular with the members of the village Soviet and with all the Russians she had to deal with in her district."

After working as a lecturer in education at the University of Sheffield, Marjorie served as the warden of Masson Hall at the University of Edinburgh from 1924 to 1937. In 1927, she was also appointed General Advisor to Women Students at the university. In this capacity, she was personally responsible for interviewing the vast majority of women students not residing in halls or recognised hostels. Upon her resignation from the post, Marjorie left a detailed guide for her successor, in which she noted:

"The chief duties of the Adviser of Women Students are to give advice on careers, on general matters, and, where necessary, on accommodation.... She is concerned with the social life of the students generally and is responsible for keeping a Register of Lodgings which is reviewed every year. She is a member of the Appointments Board and of the Athletic Committee. She has an office in the Old College and the assistance of a part-time secretary."

In 1937, Marjorie entered into lengthy correspondence with Scottish suffragist Frances Melville, hoping to compile data from all the Scottish universities to advocate for women's potential in governmental service. In response to concerns that "some parts of the world would be unsuitable for women to live in," Marjorie sought to gather information from female graduates with overseas experience about whether they had encountered difficulties because of their gender.
