= Jessie Campbell =

Promoter of higher education for women in Scotland (1827–1907)

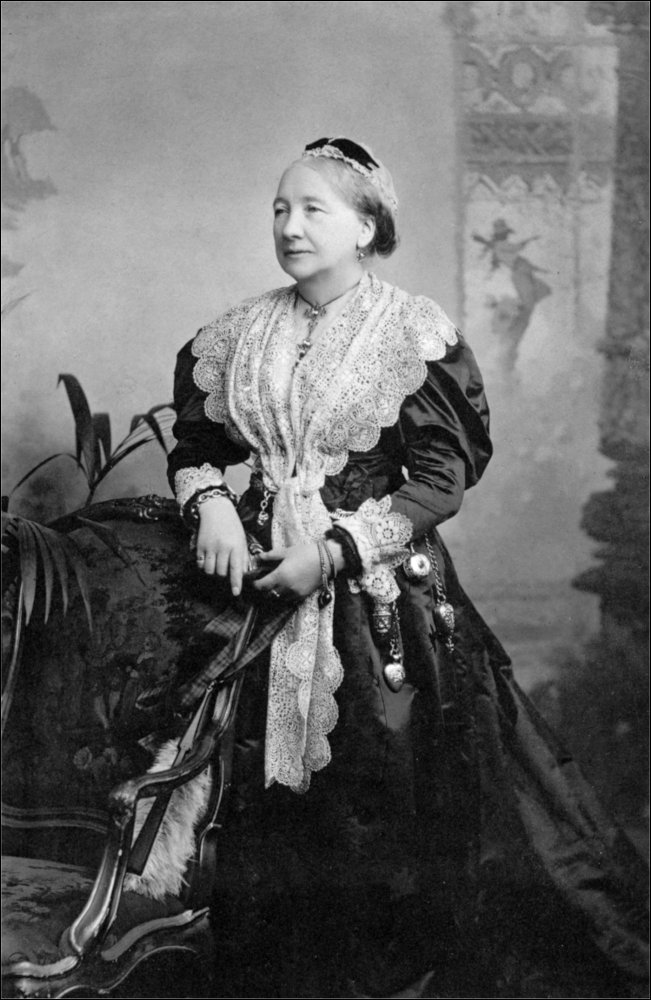
- Born: 26 March 1827; Cross-Arthurlie, Renfrewshire, Scotland
- Died: 10 February 1907 (aged 79)
- Known for: Being instrumental in the creation of the first higher education college for women in Glasgow, Scotland

Jessie (Janet) Campbell (26 March 1827 – 10 February 1907) was a Scottish woman who was instrumental in the creation of the first higher education college for women in Glasgow, Scotland.

== Biography ==
Campbell was born Janet Black on 26 March 1827 in Cross-Arthurlie in Renfrewshire, Scotland. Jessie's father owned a bleaching business in Renfrewshire. It is reported that the idea of lectures for women in Glasgow arose out of her suggestion at a dinner party. Consequently the Glasgow Association for the Higher Education of Women was established with Campbell as its Vice President. The Association held its first meeting in Glasgow, in April 1877 and a programme of lectures, led by its Chair, Professor Edward Caird began in November 1877

In 1883, this became the first college for higher education of women in Scotland: Queen Margaret College. Campbell was instrumental in securing North Park House as a base for the college, convincing Scottish philanthropist and friend Isabella Elder to purchase it. She also led the fundraising campaign for the endowment fund. Among its supporters was senior politician and future Prime Minister, Lord Roseberry and in August 1888, Queen Victoria visited. The college became part of the University of Glasgow in 1892.

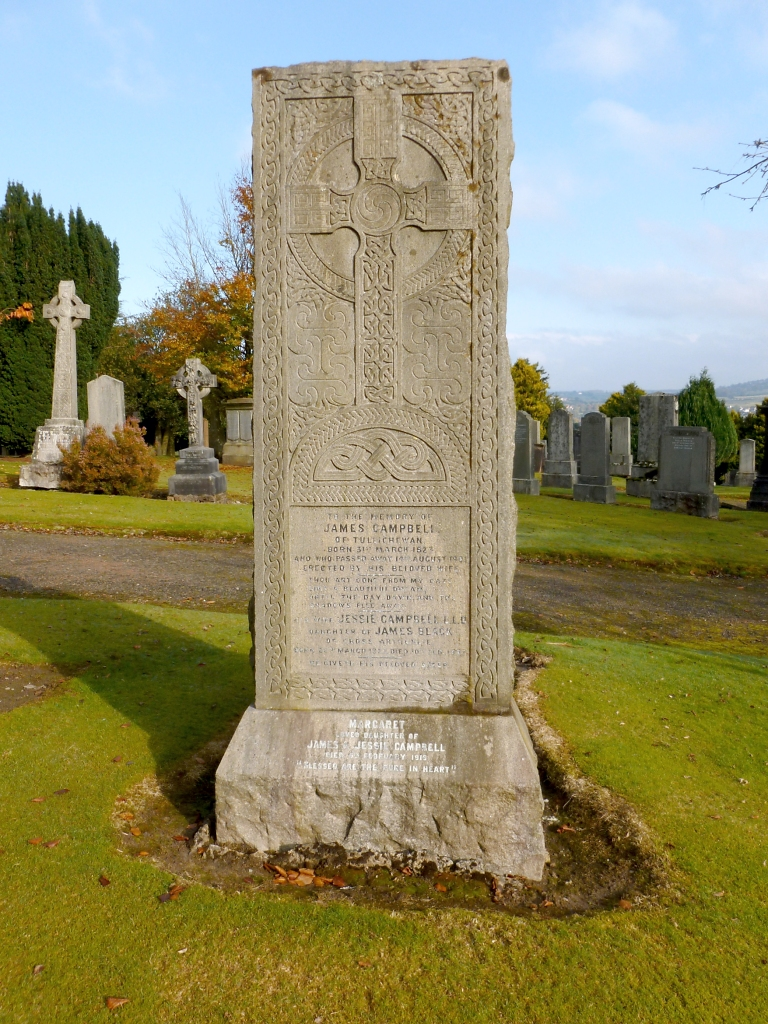
Gravestone for the Campbell family, including James and Jessie Campbell

In 1893, she was listed as a lay member of the Glasgow Society of Lady Artists then located in Charing Cross Mansions in central Glasgow.

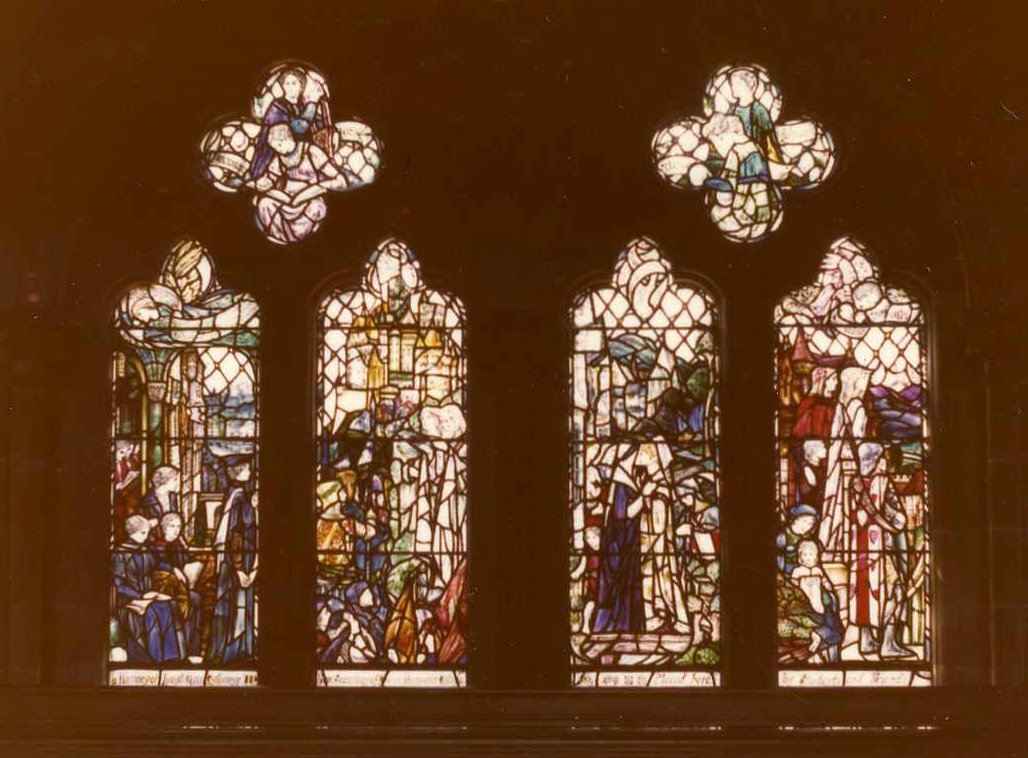
Janet Galloway Memorial Window

Campbell is pictured alongside Isabella Elder and Janet Galloway in the Janet Galloway Memorial Window in Glasgow University's Bute Hall, and was awarded an honorary degree (LLD) by the University of Glasgow in 1901.

== Personal life and death ==
She married James Campbell of Tullichewan in 1846, a cousin of Henry Campbell-Bannerman, and they had five children. She died on 10 February 1907.
