= Cottage nursing =

Cottage nurses, distinct from district nurses, was a system where poor patients in rural areas of the United Kingdom were provided with in-home care. It was established by Bertha Marion Broadwood in 1883 and lasted until the interwar years. It was not a system that was widely supported by medical and nursing staff, particularly the use of the term 'nurse'. Prior to the Nurses Registration Act 1919 the term 'nurse' had no clear definition or standardised training requirements.

Cottage nursing is not to be confused with cottage hospitals.

== History ==
Providing basic healthcare for rural populations, who often lived far from hospitals, was a challenge in the late 19th century. Although district nursing was established in Liverpool in 1859, it was felt by Broadwood and others that a trained nurse of a higher educational class was unsuited to working with poor agricultural workers.

Broadwood developed a vision for cottage nurses who were simply trained countrywomen, less expensive than district nurses and better suited for working in the rural areas. They would provide a range of in-home care. This system included three aspects:

1. They were trained in homes, not hospitals.
2. They nursed one patient at a time, staying with them for days or weeks.
3. They both provided nursing care and assisted with domestic labour. This included cooking for the family, cleaning the house, and dressing and washing the children.

Sometimes this approach was called the Holt-Ockley system. This was because the original cottage nurses worked on the Surrey-Sussex border centred on Ockley, and Broadwood adopted the Holt system, first established by Mrs and Miss Holt of Barningham Hall in Norfolk twenty years earlier, distinguished by the nurse living in the patient's cottage and caring for the family. It became more widely known as cottage nursing.

In 1883, Broadwood employed the first three cottage nurses in Surrey. In 1889, Katherine Twining, a trained nurse and member of the Twining tea company, contacted Broadwood offering to train cottage nurses in East London. They developed a three-month training course for cottage nurses that provided hands-on instruction in the homes of the poor, covering basic nursing, sanitation, and postpartum care. In the seven years from 1890, St Mary's Nurses' Home at Plaistow trained 563 women as nurses, midwives, or both, sending them to work in 28 counties and all four UK countries. In 1900 Broadwood set up her own Nurses' Training Home at Bury House in Lower Edmonton.

Some rural patronesses called for cottage nurses to also receive midwifery training, to enable them to serve as more effective replacements for the handywomen.

In 1894 there were 36 associations, with a head office in London; they became known as the Affiliated Benefit Nursing Associations. In 1906, affiliated associations were reorganised into the Cottage Benefit Nursing Association. By 1907 there were over 700 cottage nurses working across the United Kingdom, from the Scottish Highlands to Western Ireland.

In 1919 the Cottage Benefit Nursing Association stated that training of cottage nurses had increased to 12 months in theoretical and practical work, including midwifery. Trainees had to be at least 23 years old, or if younger to have an extended training of 15 months. If the examination was passed the cottage nurses would go to a branch of the Cottage Benefit Nursing Association for a minimum of three years. Govan Cottage Nurses Training Home was an example where training lasted 12 months and included midwifery. This was a branch of the Elder Cottage Hospital at Govan, bequested by Isabella Elder.

When the Nurses Registration Act (1919) was introduced, cottage nurses had an option to apply for three years of hospital training, as they were no longer able to use the term 'nurse'. Despite this, some of them continued working as unregistered nurses, something the Act did nothing to prevent. They were duly demoralised by legislation designed to make their inferiority and insufficiency a matter of legal record.

The cottage nurses often endured hardships including limited space to sleep while residing in already overcrowded cottages which were often not clean, and afforded little privacy during time off.

== Notable staff ==
Bertha Marion Broadwood was born at Bryanston Square Marylebone, London on 27 March 1846. She was the fourth daughter of Henry Fowler Broadwood, head of the piano making firm John Broadwood and Sons, and his wife Juliana Maria, daughter of Wyrley Birch of Wretham Hall, Norfolk. Broadwood died two days before her 89th birthday in 1935.
