= John Broadwood & Sons =

English piano manufacturer

- Type: Private
- Industry: Musical instruments
- Founded: 1728; 298 years ago
- Founder: Burkat Shudi
- Headquarters: London, England
- Key people: Burkat Shudi; John Broadwood
- Products: Pianos
- Website: www.broadwood.co.uk

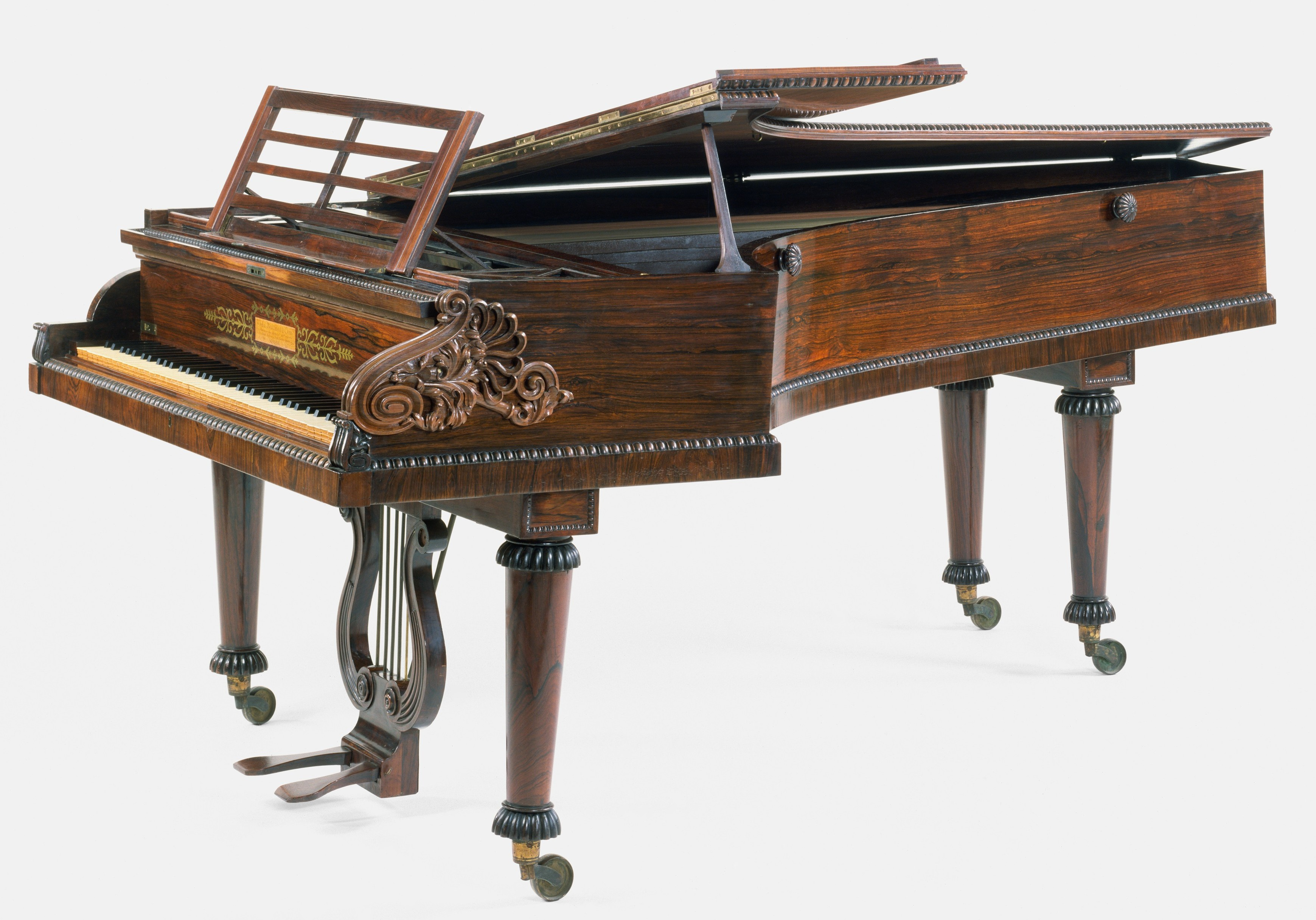
1827 Broadwood & Sons grand piano

John Broadwood & Sons is an English piano manufacturer, founded in 1728 by Burkat Shudi and continued after his death in 1773 by John Broadwood. The company was an innovator in piano design, and its instruments were used by musicians such as Joseph Haydn and Ludwig van Beethoven.

== Early history ==
John Broadwood (1732–1812), a Scottish joiner and cabinetmaker, came to London in 1761 and began to work for the Swiss harpsichord manufacturer Burkat Shudi. He married Shudi's daughter eight years later and became a partner in the firm in 1770. As the popularity of the harpsichord declined, the firm concentrated increasingly on the manufacture of pianos, abandoning the harpsichord altogether in 1793.

Broadwood's son, James Shudi Broadwood, had worked for the firm since 1785, and, in 1795, the firm began to trade as John Broadwood & Son. When Broadwood's third son, Thomas Broadwood, became a partner in 1808, the firm assumed the name of John Broadwood & Sons Ltd, which it retains to this day. The firm's busiest time period was during the 1850s, when approximately 2,500 instruments were produced annually.

== Innovations ==
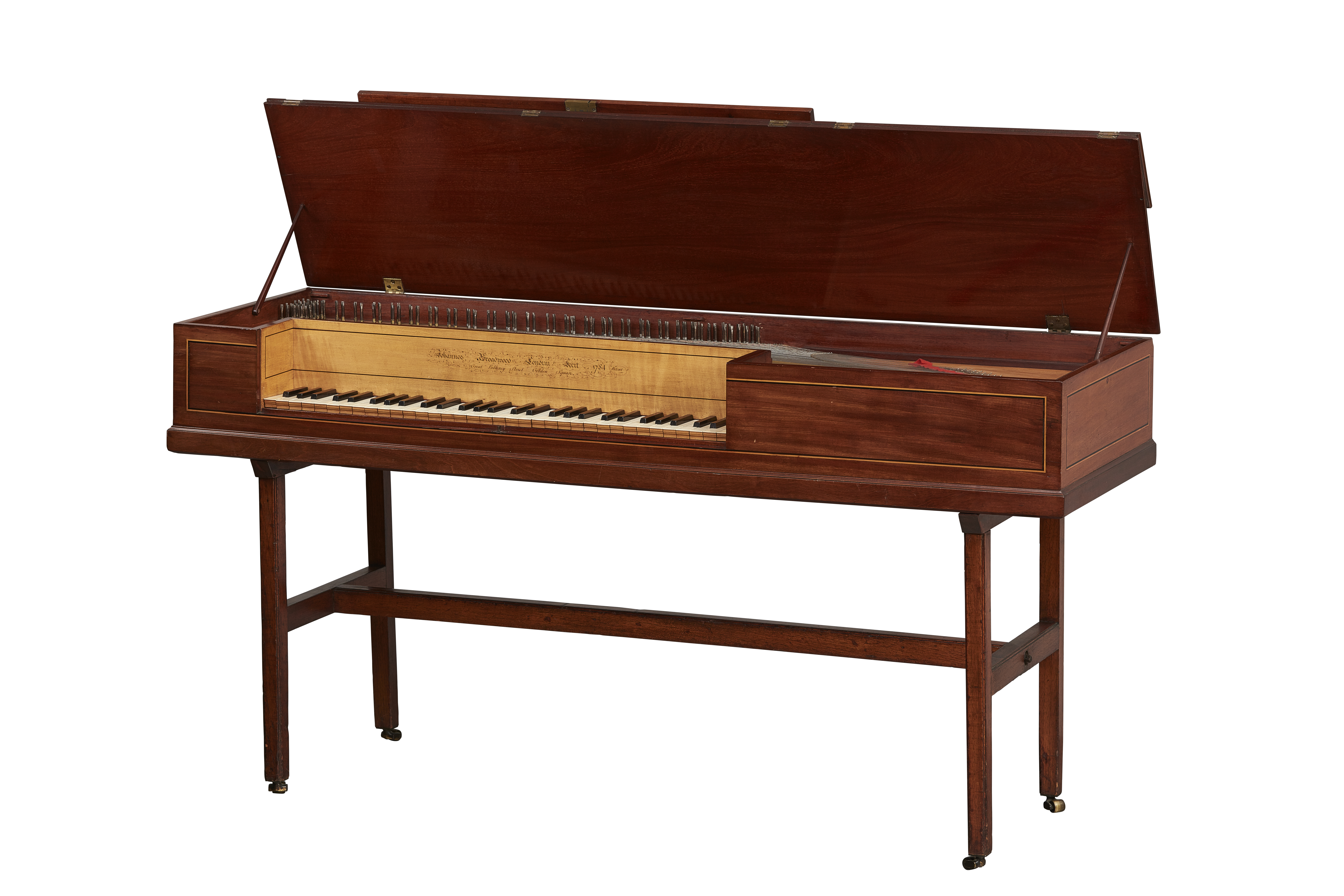
1784 square fortepiano

Broadwood produced his first square piano in 1771, after the model of Johannes Zumpe, and worked assiduously to develop and refine the instrument, moving the wrest plank of the earlier pianoforte, which had sat to the side of the case as in the clavichord, to the back of the case in 1781, straightening the keys, and replacing the hand stops with pedals. In 1785 Thomas Jefferson, later to be third President of the United States, visited Broadwood in Great Pulteney Street, Soho, to discuss musical instruments. In 1789, at Jan Ladislav Dussek's suggestion, he extended the range of his grand piano beyond five octaves to CC in the treble, and again to six full octaves in 1794. The improved instruments became popular with musicians such as Joseph Haydn, who used them on his first visit to London in 1791. Ludwig van Beethoven received a six octave Broadwood in 1817, a gift from Thomas Broadwood, which he kept for the rest of his life. Although his impaired hearing may well have prevented him appreciating its tone, he seems to have preferred it to his Erard which had a similar range. Above the company label on the front edge of the pin block the following text can be read: ″Hoc Instrumentum est Thomae Broadwood (Londrini) donum propter ingenium illustrissime Beethoven.″ [This instrument is a gift from Thomas Broadwood of London in recognition of the most illustrious genius of Beethoven.]

Frédéric Chopin played Broadwood instruments in Britain, including at the last concert of his life given at Guildhall, London, in 1848. Although he liked Broadwoods, he appears to have preferred the French make Pleyel.

== 1980s and 1990s ==
After a long period of decline ending in near bankruptcy, the business was rescued in the mid 1980s by a consortium headed up by Geoffrey Simon, a keen amateur pianist and successful businessman from Birmingham. Mr. Simon took on the mantle of CEO and under his stewardship John Broadwood & Sons entered a period during which a number of innovations were developed. These included the limited edition 'Linley piano' an upright piano designed by Viscount Linley and his partner Matthew Rice, plus the design and patenting of the 'barless' grand piano in 1997 which was manufactured by Birmingham firm of Ladbrooke Pianos, who produced half a dozen a year.

== 2000s ==
The company holds a royal warrant as a manufacturer and tuner of pianos. Following the death of Geoffrey Simon in 2006, the company was acquired in 2008 by Alastair Laurence, a piano builder and technician with family ties to the Broadwood firm dating back to 1787. To coincide with the change in ownership, new restoration and conservation workshops are now located at Finchcocks, Goudhurst, Kent, England.

== Broadwood archives ==
The company's archives are held at the Surrey History Centre. They featured in a 2024 episode of Fake or Fortune?, which investigated whether a Broadwood grand piano, owned by Chesney Hawkes, had once belonged to John Lennon. The theory remained unproven, but it was shown that he once owned a Broadwood upright piano. The Surrey History Centre also holds the archives of Bertha Broadwood who instigated the controversial cottage nursing programme.
