= John Forfar =

Scottish paediatrician and academic

John Forfar MC FRSE FRCP
- Photograph of John Forfar at work
- Born: John Oldroyd Forfar; 16 November 1916; Glasgow, Scotland
- Died: 14 August 2013 (aged 96); Edinburgh, Scotland
- Education: Perth Academy; University of St Andrews
- Employer(s): Dundee Royal Infirmary; Great Ormond Street Hospital; Royal Hospital for Sick Children, Edinburgh; University of St Andrews; University of Edinburgh
- Spouse: Isobel Fernback (m. 1942; died 2012)
- Children: Three
- Military career
- Allegiance: United Kingdom
- Branch: British Army
- Service years: 1942–1946
- Service number: 227049
- Units: Royal Army Medical Corps; No. 47 (Royal Marine) Commando
- Conflicts: World War II: Normandy landings; Operation Pluto; Operation Infatuate
- Awards: Military Cross (1945)

John Oldroyd Forfar, MC, FRSE (16 November 1916 – 14 August 2013) was a Scottish paediatrician and academic. He served in the Royal Army Medical Corps during the Second World War and later became a leading civilian paediatrician. He was Professor of Child Life and Health at the University of Edinburgh from 1964 to 1982. He was President of the British Paediatric Association from 1985 to 1988, and was instrumental in the founding of the Royal College of Paediatrics and Child Health.

== Early life ==
Forfar was born on 16 November 1916 in Glasgow, Scotland, to David Forfar and Elizabeth Campbell. His father was a minister of the Church of Scotland. He was educated at Perth Academy, a selective school in Perth. He studied medicine at the University of St Andrews. During his degree, he also studied for an intercalated Bachelor of Science (BSc). He graduated in 1941 with a Bachelor of Medicine, Bachelor of Surgery (MB ChB). Following graduation and qualification as a doctor, he undertook a six-month appointment as a house surgeon in Perth.

== Career ==
=== Military service ===
On 21 February 1942, Forfar was commissioned into the Royal Army Medical Corps, British Army, as a lieutenant. He was given the service number 227049. He briefly served with the 11th Field Ambulance, before attending the Commando Training Centre in Achnacarry, Scotland. He then joined No. 47 (Royal Marine) Commando as the battalion's medical officer. He would serve with them for eleven months from the Normandy Landings to Victory in Europe.

On 6 June 1944, Forfar joined the Allied troops landing on the Normandy beaches. 47 Commando's objective was to capture Port-en-Bessin, a 15 miles (24 km) stretch of rocky coastline sited between Gold Beach and Omaha Beach. Once captured, the area was to be a terminal for a fuel pipe-line across the Channel as part of Operation Pluto. The battalion was ordered to travel 12 miles (19 km) inland and attack the area from inside enemy territory. There was prolonged fighting but the British finally captured the area by dusk of 7 June, the day after the landings. During those two days, he had treated 52 marines, seven German soldiers and two French civilians.

Between June and November 1944, 47 Commando fought along the French and Belgian coasts. On 2 November 1944, as part of Operation Infatuate, they attacked the port of Walcheren in the Netherlands. It was a strategically important location for access to Antwerp, Belgium. It was strongly defended by the Germans and General Eisenhower described the battle as "one of the most gallant and aggressive actions of the war".

After the end of the war, Forfar returned to civilian life. He officially left the British Army in 1946.

=== Civilian medical career ===
In 1946, he joined Dundee Royal Infirmary as a registrar. During this post he trained in the specialism of paediatrics. He became a Member of the Royal College of Physicians (MRCP) in 1947 and Member of the Royal College of Physicians of Edinburgh (MRCPE) in 1948. That year he spent a short time in Great Ormond Street Hospital, London, and achieved a Diploma in Child Health (DCH). In 1948, he was promoted to consultant paediatrician at Dundee Royal Infirmary and senior lecturer in child health at the University of St Andrews.

In 1950, he moved to Edinburgh where he was a senior paediatric physician at Eastern General, Leith and Western General Hospitals. He was also appointed senior lecturer in Child Life and Health at the University of Edinburgh. In 1953, he became a Fellow of the Royal College of Physicians of Edinburgh (FRCPE). In 1958, he was awarded a higher doctorate in the form of a Doctor of Medicine (MD) with commendation from the University of St Andrews. In 1960, Forfar was elected a member of the Harveian Society of Edinburgh.

He joined the Royal Hospital for Sick Children in Edinburgh in 1964 as a Consultant Paediatrician. In the same year he was appointed to the Edward Clark Chair as Professor of Child Life and Health at the University of Edinburgh. He also became a Fellow of the Royal College of Physicians (FRCP) in 1964. In 1973, the first edition of Forfar and Arneil's Textbook of Paediatrics was published. He retired in 1982 and was appointed professor emeritus.

Outside of academia and his hospital work, he held a number of positions. He served on the committees of the Royal College of Physicians of Edinburgh and of London. He was an elected member of the General Medical Council from 1984 to 1986. He was president of the British Paediatric Association from 1985 to 1988. He then lobbied for the recognition of the Association as a Royal College and finally succeeded when it became the Royal College of Paediatrics and Child Health in 1996.

== Personal life ==
In 1942, he married Isobel Mary Langlands Fernback. She was also a medical doctor and they met while studying at the University of St Andrews. She predeceased her husband, dying in 2012. Together they had three children; David, Colin and Joan.

He died in Edinburgh on 14 August 2013, aged 96.

== Honours and decorations ==

On 22 March 1945, it was gazetted that Forfar had been awarded the Military Cross (MC) and had been mentioned in dispatches 'in recognition of gallant and distinguished services in North West Europe'. The event meriting the award of a Military Cross occurred on 3 November 1944 and the citation can be summed up as 'for his bravery in tending wounded fellow Commandos under heavy fire at Walcheren in the Netherlands'. He was mentioned in dispatches by Lieutenant General Sir Brian Horrocks for his role in the treatment of wounded Royal Marines during the assault on Port-en-Bessin in 1944. He was also the recipient of four World War II campaign medals; the 1939–1945 Star, the France and Germany Star, the Defence Medal, and the War Medal 1939–1945.

In 2016 a luxury small scale holiday village was completed, right behind the dunes of Dishoek at the coast of Walcheren. The road that connects the villas is named "John O. Forfarstraat". The son of John Forfar, together with a number of veterans, was present at the ceremony to reveal the streetsign on 2 November 2015.

Military Cross	awarded 1945
1939–1945 Star	
France and Germany Star	
Defence Medal	
War Medal 1939–1945	with mention in despatches oak leaf

In 1975, he was elected a Fellow of the Royal Society of Edinburgh (FRSE). He was the 1983 James Spence Medallist, the highest award of the British Paediatric Association. He received the Royal Marine Historical Society Award in 2005. A street in Port-en-Bessin is named Allée Professeur John Forfar in his honour in 2009.
