= Frances Melville =

Scottish suffragist (1873–1962)

- artist unknown
- Born: Frances Helen Melville; 11 October 1873; Merchiston, Edinburgh, Scotland
- Died: 7 March 1962 (aged 88); Edinburgh, Scotland
- Resting place: Warriston Cemetery, Edinburgh, Scotland
- Education: University of Edinburgh; University of St Andrews
- Known for: Women's rights Higher education Political activism

Frances Helen Melville (11 October 1873 – 7 March 1962), was a Scottish suffragist, advocate for higher education for women in Scotland, and one of the first women to matriculate at the University of Edinburgh in 1892. She was president of the British Federation of University Women from 1935 to 1942.

== Early life ==
Melville was born in Merchiston in Edinburgh, the elder daughter of Francis Suther Melville, a depute clerk of the Court of Session, and Helen Alexandrina Kerr. Melville was one of seven children – five brothers and two sisters. She spent her childhood in Edinburgh, where she was educated at George Watson's Ladies' College and later studied music for a year in Germany.

== Education ==
Following the 1889 Universities (Scotland) Act which allowed women to graduate from universities in Scotland, Melville became one of the first women to matriculate at the University of Edinburgh in 1892. She graduated five years later in 1897 with a first class MA Honours degree in Philosophy. In 1910, Melville was awarded a Bachelor of Divinity degree by the University of St Andrews, the first woman in Scotland to graduate with this degree.

== Academic career ==
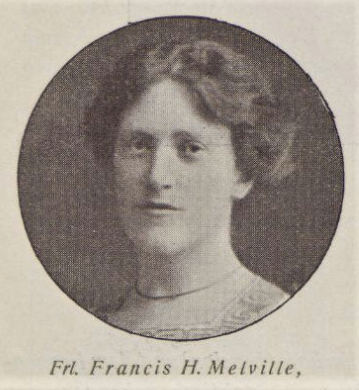
Frances Melville (1904)

Following graduation, Melville worked as a tutor at the University of Edinburgh from 1896 to 1899, where she taught classes on logic, psychology, and metaphysics run by Professor Andrew Seth Pringle-Pattinson. From 1899 to 1909, Melville held the post of Warden of University Hall at the University of St Andrews. On her departure she wrote a "Memorandum on the duties of the warden of University Hall", which is held by the University of St Andrews Archives.

After a short spell as lecturer in Mental and Moral Science at Cheltenham Ladies' College, Melville succeeded Janet Anne Galloway as Mistress of Queen Margaret College, University of Glasgow, in 1909, a post she held until the closure of the college in 1935. Melville's tenure at the college was described as progressive, and she encouraged the women to socialise more with the male students.

After becoming Head of the Women's Department at the University of Glasgow, Melville was asked to gather information on the suitability of women for diplomatic and consular service positions. This led to a lengthy correspondence between Melville and educationist Marjorie Rackstraw, warden of Masson House at the University of Edinburgh. Rackstraw was hoping to compile data from all Scottish universities in support of women's potential for governmental service and sought Melville's help to provide information on Glasgow's female graduates.

At the height of her career, Melville was the most senior female academic in Scotland, notable for her academic achievements and administrative abilities. In 1927 she was awarded an honorary LL.D by the University of Glasgow. She was the first woman academic to receive an honorary degree from the university. In King's Birthday Honours list of 1935 Melville was awarded an OBE.

== Political activism ==
Throughout her life, Melville campaigned for the cause of women's education. In 1902, she presented a paper "University Education for Women in Scotland: Its Effects on Social and Intellectual Life" at the Conference of the National Union of Women Workers of Great Britain and Ireland in Edinburgh and in 1911 contributed a paper titled "The Education of Woman" to a collection of essays The Position of Woman: Actual and Real. Melville argued that all women should have access to a general education and that the false dichotomy between the female ideals of domesticity and professionalism had a damaging influence on attitudes to women's education. During her time at St Andrews she set up the Association of University Women, from 1930 to 1931 she was president of the Soroptimists Club, and she was president of the British Federation of University Women from 1935 to 1942

Melville was also an active and prominent Suffragist and a member of the Edinburgh National Society for Women's Suffrage, the Scottish Universities Women's Suffrage Union, the Glasgow Women Citizens' Association and the Glasgow Society for Equal Citizenship. In 1906, Melville, together with Margaret Nairn, Chrystal Macmillan, Frances Simson, and Elsie Inglis took the universities of St Andrews and Edinburgh to the Court of Session, arguing that as members of the general council, they were entitled to vote. The University of Edinburgh conceded that

The women have been admitted to graduation in several of the faculties of the universities and their names have been placed on the Register of the General Council. They have attended and voted at the meetings of the General Council, and they have hitherto enjoyed and exercised all the privileges possessed by male graduates of the universities.

However they refused to grant their request. After losing their case in 1907, Melville and her colleagues appealed through the House of Lords in 1908, but again the appeal was lost.

In 1937, after the death of Ramsay MacDonald, Melville stood as an independent candidate in the Scottish Universities by-election, which was won by Sir John Anderson. Melville came second, ahead of Andrew Dewar Gibb and Sir Peter Chalmers Mitchell, with 5618 votes.

During World War I Melville undertook a range of war work related to training women and during World War II she was a driver for the Home Guard.

== Death ==
During her retirement, Melville lived in Dalry in Kirkcudbrightshire, before moving back to Edinburgh where she died on 7 March 1962 at her home on Merchiston Place. She is buried in Warriston Cemetery, Edinburgh.

== Legacy ==
Melville House at the University of Glasgow is named in honour of Frances Melville, and the university awards the Frances Melville medal annually to the most distinguished honours candidate in mental philosophy.

== Works and publications ==
- Melville, Frances H.; Donaldson, Sir James (1902). University Education for Women in Scotland: Its Effects on Social and Intellectual Life. A Paper Read at the Conference of the National Union of Women Workers of Great Britain and Ireland, Edinburgh, October, 1902 by Frances H. Melville, M.A., Warden of University Hall, St. Andrews. St. Andrews: W.C. Henderson and Son. OCLC 913571365.
- Melville, Frances H. (1949). The British Federation of University Women, a History. London: British Federation of University Women. OCLC 806040969.
