= Gavin Arneil =

Scottish paediatric nephrologist (1923–2018)

- Born: 7 March 1923; Bearsden, East Dunbartonshire, Scotland
- Died: 21 January 2018 (aged 94); Helensburgh, Argyll and Bute, Scotland
- Occupation: Paediatric nephrologist
- Spouse: June Lauder (m. 1961)
- Children: 1

Gavin Cranston Arneil (7 March 1923 – 21 January 2018) was a Scottish paediatric nephrologist. At the Royal Hospital for Sick Children in Glasgow, he established the first specialised unit in Britain for children with kidney disease.

== Biography ==
Gavin Arneil was born in 1923 in Bearsden, on the fringe of Glasgow. His father was a university lecturer and his mother was a teacher. Educated at Jordanhill School, Arneil went on to attend the University of Glasgow between 1940 and 1945, while also serving as a member of the Home Guard. He then joined the Royal Army Medical Corps, serving as a major for three years.

In 1961 at Dunfermline Abbey, Arneil married June Lauder. They had a daughter together, Marion.

Arneil died on 21 January 2018, aged 94.

== Medical career ==
Arneil joined the staff of Glasgow's Royal Hospital for Sick Children after graduating. He trained in paediatrics under the mentorship of James Holmes Hutchison, and was eventually appointed a consultant at the Royal Hospital for Sick Children. He quickly developed an interest in nephrology and in 1950 he established a paediatric renal unit at Royal Hospital for Sick Children. This was the first specialised unit for children's kidney disease in Britain, and one of the first in Europe. Arneil's unit pioneered the use of cortisone, prednisolone and thiazides in paediatric renal conditions as well as the use of peritoneal dialysis in children with acute kidney injury.

Arneil's other major interests included sudden infant death syndrome (cot death) and rickets. A Scottish survey conducted by Arneil in 1981–82 first showed the risk of cot death associated with laying babies on their front, maternal smoking, and babies sleeping in the same bed as their parents. He is credited with the near-eradication of rickets from Glasgow, and when the disease began to reappear in Pakistani migrants he helped to create a successful educational cartoon dubbed into Hindi and Urdu. He also promoted the BCG vaccine in young children, which led to the disappearance of pre-school tuberculosis.

== Affiliations and memberships ==
Arneil was a founding member of the European Society of Paediatric Nephrology in 1967. At the inaugural meeting of the American Society for Paediatric Nephrology in 1969, he was invited to present a guest lecture and was introduced as "the father of paediatric nephrology in Europe". He was also involved in the establishment of the International Paediatric Nephrology Association in 1974, serving as its secretary-general from its inception until 1983.

== Works ==
With Edinburgh paediatrician John Forfar, he authored Forfar and Arneil's Textbook of Paediatrics, first published in 1973 and in its eighth edition at the time of Arneil's death.

== Awards and honors ==
In 1983 he was awarded the St Mungo Prize, the highest civic award of the City of Glasgow.
