= Isabella Elder =

Scottish philanthropist (1828–1905)

Isabella Ure Elder
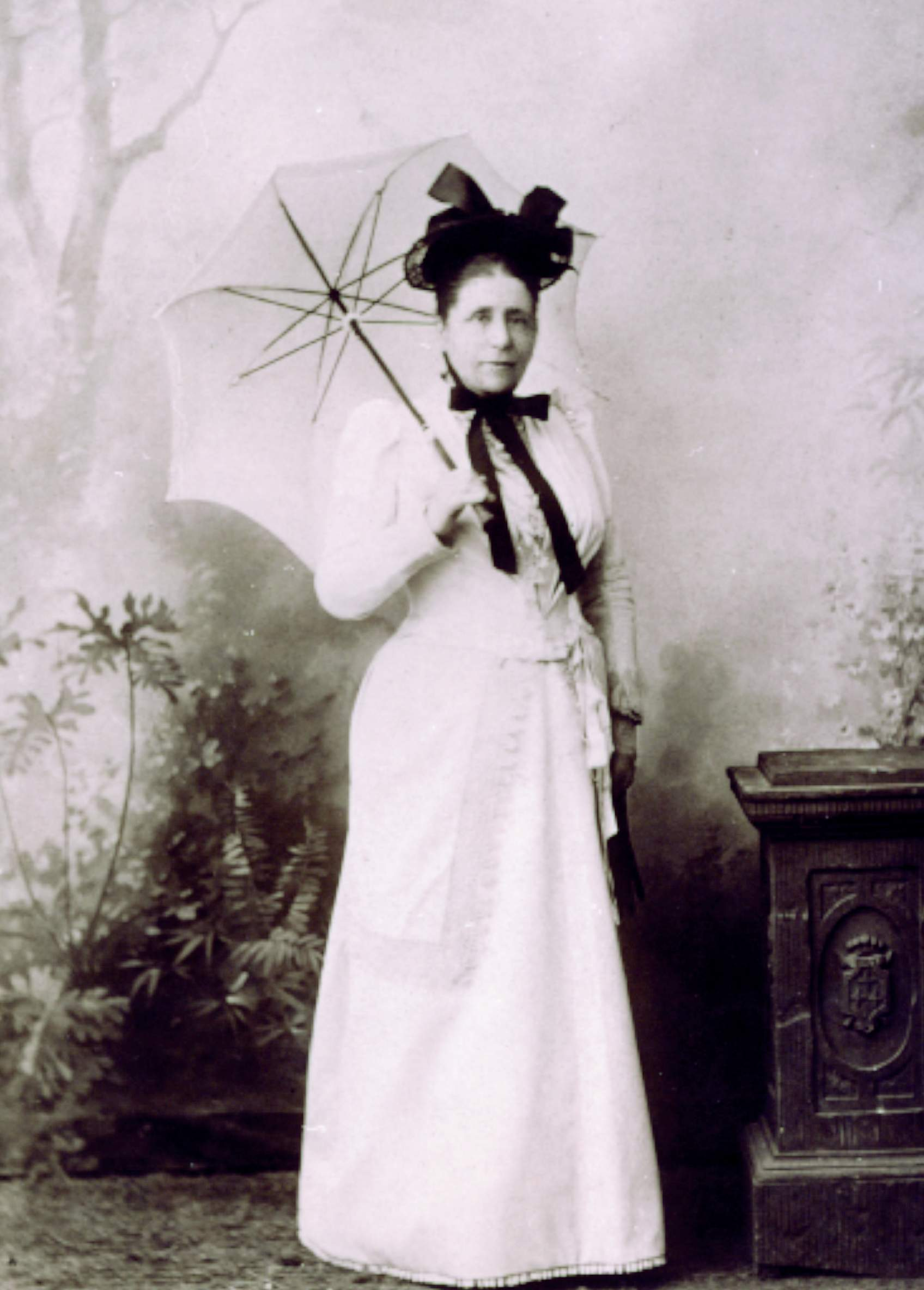
- Born: 15 March 1828; Glasgow, Scotland
- Died: 18 November 1905 (aged 77); Glasgow, Scotland
- Monuments: Elder Park, Govan, Elder Park Library, Cottage Hospital, School for Domestic Economy, Cottage Nurses Training Home, John Elder Statue
- Occupation: Philanthropist
- Known for: Philanthropy, Advocating for Women's Education (especially Nurses and Doctors), Gifting Elder Park and Elder Park Library, Govan/Glasgow
- Spouse: John Elder (shipbuilder)

Isabella Ure Elder (15 March 1828 – 18 November 1905) was a Scottish philanthropist who took a particular interest in education, especially of women, and in the welfare of the people of Govan in Glasgow. In Govan alone, Elder was responsible for building Elder Park Library, a School for Domestic Economy, Cottage Hospital, the Cottage Nurses Training Home, and erecting a statue in honour of her husband John Elder. She also gave Elder Park to the people of Govan. Many of her philanthropic works are still open to the community today.

== Early life ==
Isabella Ure was born to Mary Ure (née Ross) on 15 March 1828 in Glasgow's Gorbals district. Her father, Alexander Ure (1788–1830), was a solicitor. She was the only surviving daughter of the family, however, she had one older brother, John Francis (1820–1883). Her education is unknown.

== Personal Life ==
In 1857 she married John Elder (1824–1869), a partner in marine engineers Randolph, Elder & Co. In 1860 the thriving business acquired a shipyard at Govan, and in 1868 became known as John Elder & Co. By the time John Elder died in 1869 it was regarded as one of the world's leading shipbuilders.

Following her husband's death, Elder became the sole owner of the business and ran it successfully for nine months until it was transferred to a partnership led by her brother. As a wealthy widow with no children, she toured the Continent for extended periods and became a major philanthropist in Glasgow.

== Philanthropy ==
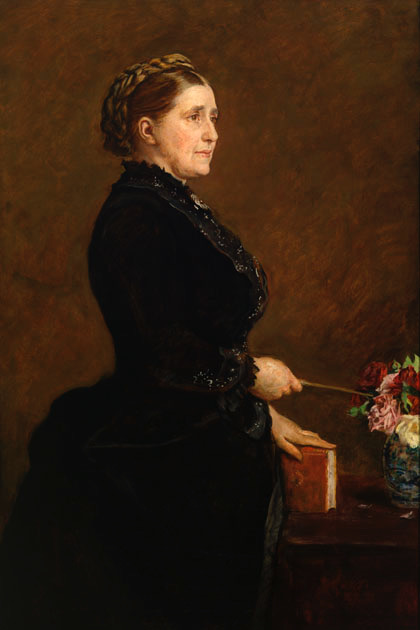
Portrait of Isabella Elder by Sir John Everett Millais

=== Investment in universities ===
During her widowhood, Elder lived at 6 Claremont Terrace, next to Kelvingrove Park and close to the University of Glasgow in which she took a keen interest. Her donations to the university included £5000 to support the Chair of Civil Engineering, in 1873, and £12,500 to fund the endowment of the John Elder Chair of Naval Architecture, in 1883.

The Glasgow and West of Scotland Technical College, now University of Strathclyde, received a £5,000 endowment in her will to fund a series of "Lectures of Descriptive Astronomy", named the David Elder lectures in honour of her father-in-law.

In 1883, Elder purchased North Park House in Glasgow's West End. She provided the property, rent free, to house Queen Margaret College which had been founded as the first college in Scotland to offer higher education to women.

=== Investment in women's education, and the first women doctors ===
In addition to providing the Queen Margaret College building, Elder also financed College's courses in medicine to women, starting in 1890. The courses were taught by staff from University of Glasgow, however, it was initially not possible for women to qualify for a degree. The college became a part of University of Glasgow in 1892 after the announcement by the University Commissioners (Scotland) that women would be accepted into universities.

The first women graduates for medicine took place in 1894, and for the arts in 1895. Elder was concerned that women would receive sub-standard teaching if taught separately, and she only agreed to hand over North Park House to the university on condition that the teaching provided to women was equal to that of men. She was disappointed in the standard of lecturing, however, and in 1899 refused to give the Principal more money unless the original agreement was kept.

=== Investment in Govan, Glasgow ===
Many of Elder's philanthropic projects were sited in Govan, Glasgow. In 1883 she purchased 37 acres (15 ha) near Elder's Fairfield Shipyard and created Elder Park, named in honour of her husband and her father-in-law, David. It opened on 27 June 1885 and for many years she paid for an annual display of fireworks there. Also in 1885, she set up a School for Domestic Economy where young women learned how to cook and perform other household tasks on a limited budget. In 1901, she funded the building and stocking of Elder Free Library, which is sited in one corner of Elder Park and remains open to the community, and also provided a villa for the Cottage Nurses Training Home. In 1903, she provided the funds to build the Elder Cottage Hospital, and she continued to fund this enterprise until her death.

=== Investment in the training of nurses ===
Elder was the first president of the Glasgow and West of Scotland Co-Operation of Trained Nurses. In 1905 she also gave the organisation £1100.

== Death ==
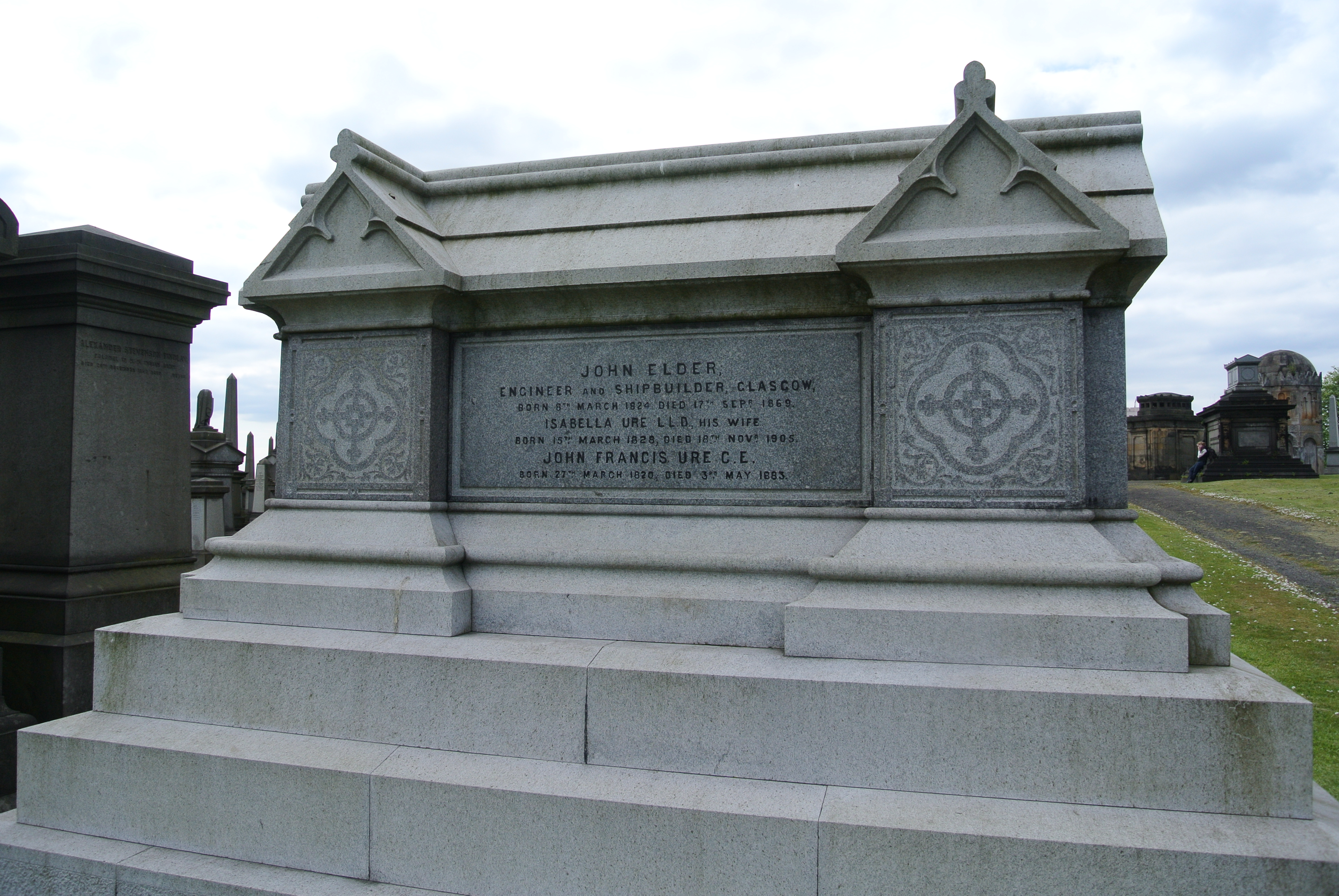
Tomb of John and Isabella Elder

Elder died at her home in Glasgow on 18 November 1905 of heart failure, gout and bronchitis. Her death certificate was signed by Dr Marion Gilchrist, the first woman to graduate in medicine in Glasgow. On 22 November she was buried in the family tomb in Glasgow Necropolis. Her will left more than £125,000 for charitable purposes including the Ure Elder Fund for Indigent Widows of Govan and Glasgow.

== Tributes ==
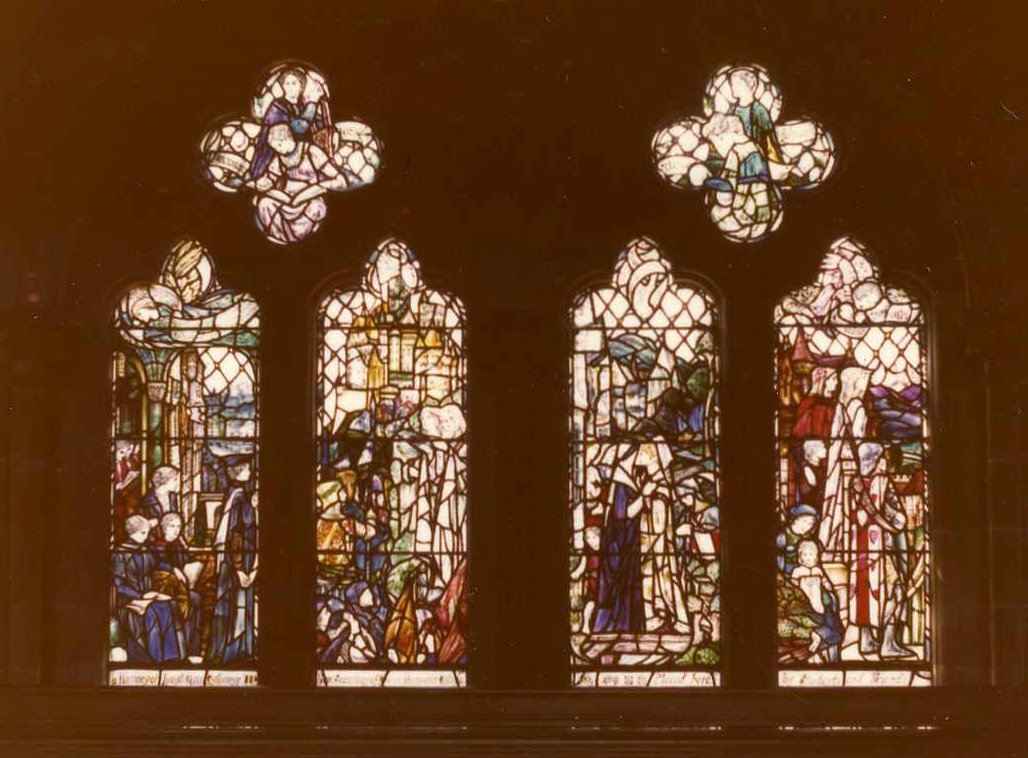
Memorial Window, Bute Hall, University of Glasgow

The University of Glasgow awarded Elder an honorary degree (LLD) in 1901. A Glasgow newspaper, The Bailie, described her as "a true woman, a wise benefactress of the public and of learning." In December 2015, the university named a building after her. She is also commemorated on the university's Memorial Quincentennial Gates and in a memorial window in Bute Hall, titled The Pursuit of Ideal Education, where she is pictured alongside Janet Anne Galloway and Jessie Campbell.^{[2]}

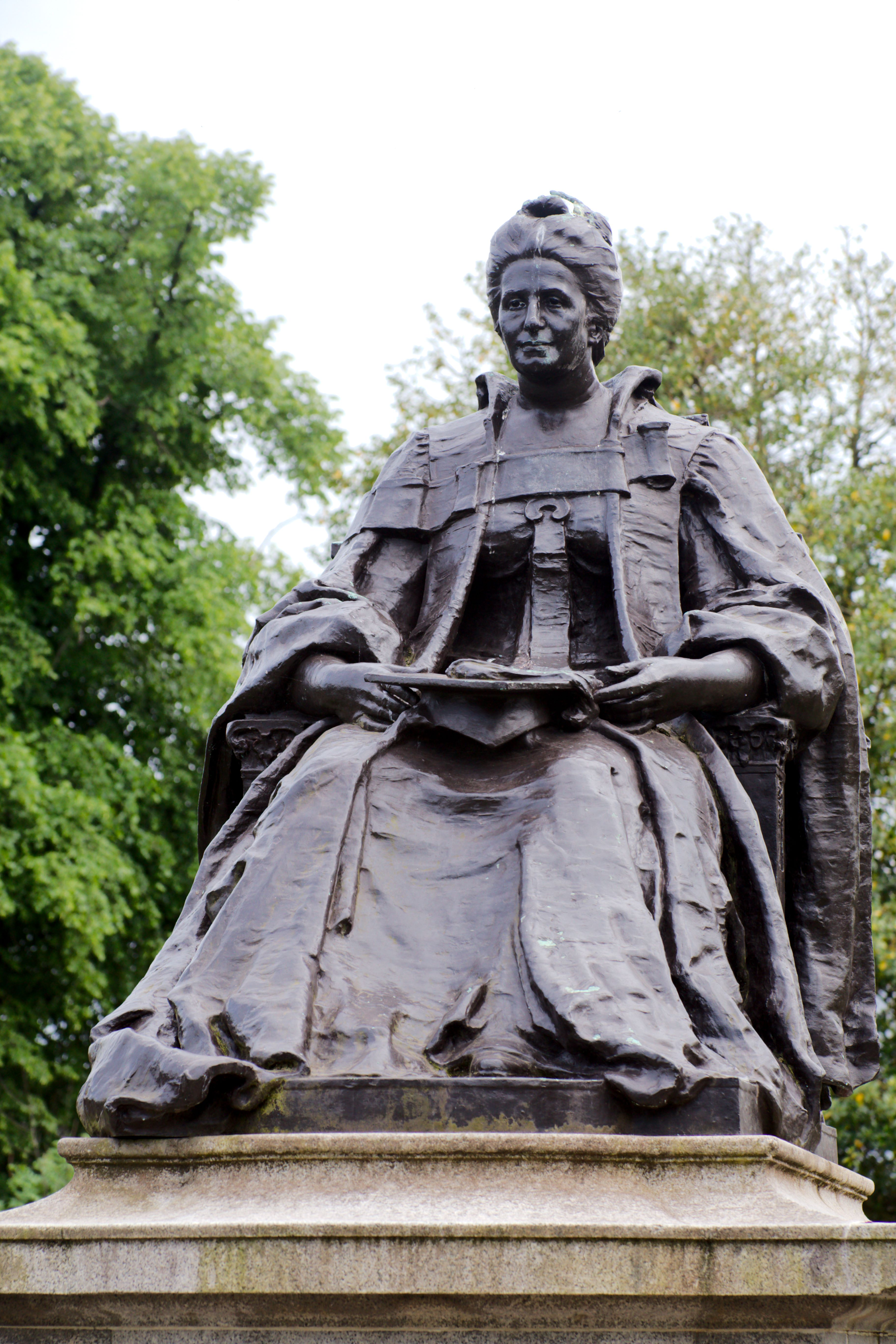
Statue of Isabella Elder, Elder Park, Govan, Glasgow

In 1906, a bronze statue of Elder on a granite base and surrounded by a memorial garden, was unveiled in Elder Park by the Provost of Govan, Sir John Anthony. Elder is shown seated, wearing her academic gown with her mortar board in her lap. The sculptor was Glasgow graduate Archibald Macfarlane Shannan (1850–1915) and the £2,000 cost was raised by public subscription, much of it from the ordinary people of Govan who held her in high regard. It was one of the first statues of a woman in Glasgow, and remains one of only four statues commemorating named women, rather than allegorical figures (the other three statues are of Dolores Ibarruri on the Clyde Walkway; Mary Barbour in Govan; Queen Victoria in George Square.) Elder's statue is Category A Listed and the monument and memorial gardens were restored in 2010.

In 2026, a mural depicting Elder was unveiled in Govan. It was created by artist Rogue One and commemorates Elder's philanthropical contributions, such as the financing of Elder Park. The mural has a profile of Elder with roses and the Elder Park Library also shown.

Another Elder Park exists in Adelaide, Australia, however, this is named for a different Elder family. At one time, both parks had a similar bandstand, however the Govan one has since been lost.

Elder also has a bicycle named in her honour, The Glasgow tour company Gallus Pedals has named its bikes after a number of famous Glaswegian women in several categories. Elder is in the category "Leaders, Philanthropists and Community Builders" along with Beatrice Clugston.
