= John Adam Cramb =

Scottish historian

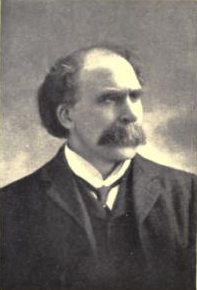
John Adam Cramb c.1913

John Adam Cramb (4 May 1862 – October 1913) was a Scottish historian and fervent patriot. He published non-fiction works under his own name, and fiction under the pseudonym of R. A. Revermont.

Cramb was born at Denny, Falkirk in Scotland, on 4 May 1862. On leaving school he went to University of Glasgow, where he graduated in 1885, taking 1st Class Honours in Classics. In the same year he was appointed to the Luke Fellowship in English Literature, he also studied at University of Bonn. He subsequently travelled in continental Europe, and in 1887 he married the third daughter of the late Mr. Edward W. Selby Lowndes of Winslow, and left one son. From 1888 to 1890 he was Lecturer in Modern History at Queen Margaret College, Glasgow.

Settling in London in 1890, he contributed several articles to the Dictionary of National Biography, and also occasional reviews to periodicals. For many years he was an examiner for the Civil Service Commission. In 1892, he was appointed Lecturer and in 1893 was made Professor of Modern History at Queen's College, London, where he lectured until his death. He was also an occasional lecturer on military history at the Staff College, Camberley, and at York, Chatham, and other centres. In London he gave private courses on history, literature and philosophy. His last series of lectures was delivered in February and March, 1913, the subject being the relations between England and Germany. In response to many requests, he was engaged in preparing these lectures for publication when he died in October 1913. The book was published posthumously in 1914.
