= Violet Mary Craig Roberton =

Scottish politician (1888–1954)

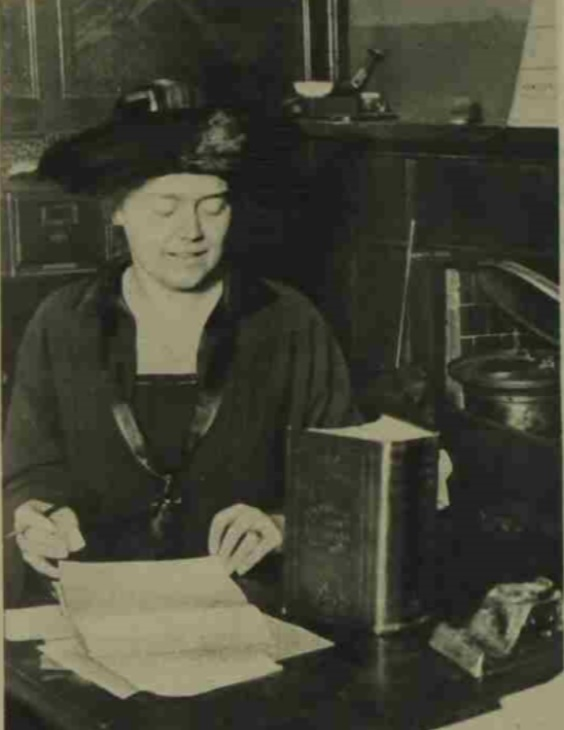
- Born: 1888; Glasgow, Scotland
- Died: 1954 (aged 65–66); Glasgow, Scotland
- Education: Queen Margaret College (Glasgow)
- Occupation: Politician
- Years active: 1921–1954
- Known for: Local Politics
- Parents: William Craig Roberton (father); Jane Reid (mother)

Violet Mary Craig Roberton, CBE (1888–1954) was a politician and local councillor, active in Glasgow, Scotland from 1921 to 1954.

== Early life and education ==
She was born in Lynedoch Place, Glasgow in 1888. Her parents were William Craig Roberton, a solicitor, and Jane Leney Reid. After her early education at Park School, Glasgow, she matriculated at Queen Margaret College. There she studied English and French Literature between 1905 and 1908. She also studied music for a time in Dresden.

== Political career ==
Roberton filled a vacancy on Glasgow Parish Council in 1912, and was re-elected in 1919. In 1921 she was elected as magistrate and local councillor for the city of Glasgow. She was a member of a number of committees, including parks, tramways, baths and wash-houses, building regulations and chemical laboratories. She was convenor of the health committee. In the 1923 General Election, she stood unsuccessfully as the Unionist parliamentary candidate for St Rollox ward. During the campaign, she was physically abused at an election meeting.

In 1921, she travelled to Australia, New Zealand and Canada to learn about the experiences of women in those countries.

Roberton was elected president of the Royal Sanitary Association of Scotland in 1937.

== Honours ==
She was appointed a Commander of the Order of the British Empire (CBE) in January 1928. She was awarded an honorary Doctor of Laws from University of Glasgow in 1943, and in 1952, she received the St Mungo Prize in Glasgow for "the person who has done most in the past three years for the good of the city by making it more beautiful, healthier, or more honoured."
