= Queen Margaret College (Glasgow) =

Women-only educational institution in Glasgow, Scotland

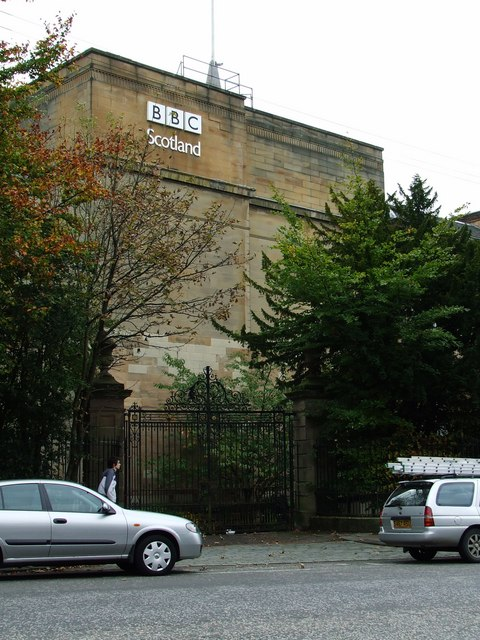
- North Park House was the campus of Queen Margaret College, before its sale to BBC Scotland in 1935.
- Former name: The Glasgow Association for the Higher Education of Women (1877-1883)
- Type: Women's college
- Active: 1877 (Note: as the Glasgow Association for the Higher Education of Women)–1935 (Note: While the college merged with the University of Glasgow in 1892, it retained elements like administrating the womens department of the university and tutorial services until the building's closure in 1935)
- Affiliations: University of Glasgow (from 1892)
- Secretary/Mistress: Janet Anne Galloway (1877-1909); Frances Melville (1909-1935)
- Location: Glasgow, Scotland
- Campus: Urban
- Colours: Blue and Gold

Queen Margaret College was a women-only higher education institution based in North Park House in Kelvinside, Glasgow, Scotland.

Originating from a series of lectures suggested by Jessie Campbell, The institution existed from its initial formation in 1877 as an association for higher education, before then becoming an independent college in 1883. The college merged and became a part of the University of Glasgow in 1892, retaining some functions until its closure in 1935.

== History ==
The college originated from a series of English literature lectures for women that were suggested by Janet "Jessie" Campbell to Professor John Nichol of the University of Glasgow. The suggestion had been made at a dinner party in 1868, having been influenced by developments in England occurring at Cambridge. In 1863, Cambridge had become the first higher education institution in England to open its entrance exams to women.

The first series of lectures were held at the Corporation Galleries on Sauchiehall Street. The lecture series would lead to a public meeting in 1877 to establish the Glasgow Association for the Higher Education of Women, which was presided over by Principal John Caird. This meeting also appointed Princess Louise as their honorary president, and Jessie Campbell as vice president.

The first secretary of the association and later the college was Janet Anne Galloway.

In 1883, the association became a college for women in Glasgow, and was named after Queen Margaret of Scotland. The college purchased North Park House, which was built between 1869 and 1871 for John and Matthew Bell, owners of the Glasgow Pottery. The purchase was done with the assistance of Isabella Elder who donated £12,000 to the college. The college moved into the premises adjacent to the university's Botanic Gardens on 3 November 1884.

The college appointed Princess Louise as their honorary president, and in 1888, Queen Victoria visited the college.

A proposal to provide medical courses for women was made in 1889 with the financial backing of Elder. A formal motion was adopted at the Annual General Meeting of the college on 28 April 1890 Classes in the study of medicine commenced for 13 students in the winter session of 1890/1891.

A new Medical Hall was built in 1895, designed by John Keppie with input by Charles Rennie Mackintosh. The funding for the erection of this purpose-built facility came from the Bellahouston Trust which had been established for charitable, religious and educational purposes in the city. Keppie and Mackintosh's building was formally opened on 18 November 1895 by Rev. John Caird, Principal of the University of Glasgow.

=== Merger with the University of Glasgow ===
The passing of the Universities (Scotland) Act 1889 allowed universities to award degrees to women, and the prospect of the college merging with the University of Glasgow led to a legal battle between Isabella Elder and the university. While university administrators assumed that the college was to be absorbed, Elder argued her donations were given on the basis that the teaching of women would remain separate but to the same standard as the teaching of men. The administrators ignored Elder and moved ahead with the integration, which led to her ceasing her donations to the university.

The college merged with the University of Glasgow in 1892, on the condition that North Park House remain solely for the education of women. Students of the college became students of the University of Glasgow as well and the administration of the women's department and tutorial services remained under control of the college. The number of students increased from 600 in 1909 to 1708 during the 1929/1930 academic year, leading to the college being unable to cope with the increased amount of students, who increasingly attended University of Glasgow classes instead.

Due to falling demand, the university closed the college in November 1935 and sold the building to BBC Scotland. In a speech at the closing ceremony, Frances Melville made it clear her worries that gender integration would mean that women's educational needs could not be protected.

== Legacy ==
Queen Margaret College leaves a strong legacy within the university, in the form of the Queen Margaret Union, Queen Margaret Settlement, and Queen Margaret Halls of Residence in Kelvinside.

BBC Scotland eventually moved to a new building at Pacific Quay in 2007.

=== Queen Margaret Hall ===
Queen Margaret Hall was opened in Lilybank House in 1894 as accommodation for the college's students. The hall was taken over by the University in 1923, and was merged with Robertson Hall at Lilybank Terrace in 1926. Halls were expanded on Bute Gardens and later Bellshaugh Road into the 1950s-1960s.

=== Queen Margaret Union ===
In 1890, the students of the college founded the Queen Margaret Union to cater for social and cultural activities. The Union was originally housed in the college's basement until 1906, when the college's growth meant the space was required for teaching. The Union subsequently occupied accommodation at 31 Buckingham Terrace, close to the college building, the former College Club at 67 Ann Street (now Southpark Terrance), a house at 1 University Gardens and the John McIntyre Building, before finally acquiring a home of its own at 22 University Gardens in 1968. Following several requests from male students wishing to join, the Union amended its constitution in 1979 to permit men to become members. The GUU followed two years later.

The archives for the Queen Margaret College are maintained by the Archives of the University of Glasgow (GUAS).

== Notable alumni and staff ==
- Jessie Campbell founder
- John Adam Cramb: historian (lecturer 1888–1890)
- Janet Anne Galloway, Secretary of the Glasgow Association for the Higher Education of Women (1877-1883), Secretary of the Queen Margaret Union (1883-1892), Secretary of the Women's Department of the University of Glasgow (1893-1909).
- Dr Marion Gilchrist: first woman to graduate from the University of Glasgow and first woman to graduate in medicine from a Scottish University
- Frances Melville, Secretary and Mistress of the College (1909-1935)
- James Hogarth Pringle (lecturer)
- Violet Mary Craig Robertson: one of the first women to be elected as a councillor in Glasgow
- Kathleen Rutherford, physician, philanthropist, humanitarian aid worker and peace campaigner.
- Mary Anderson Snodgrass: suffragist and one of the first women to be elected as councillor in Glasgow
- Emmeline Stuart: medical doctor and Church Missionary Society missionary to Persia

== See also ==
- Edinburgh Association for the University Education of Women
- BBC Scotland
- BBC Pacific Quay
- Kelvinside
- Pacific Quay
- University of Glasgow
