= James Nicholson =

James, Jim, or Jimmy Nicholson may refer to:

- James Nicholson (naval officer) (1737–1804), United States navy captain
- James W. Nicholson (1821–1887), United States Navy admiral
- James Nicholson (poet) (1822–1897), Scottish labouring-class poet
- James Nicholson (Canadian politician) (1827–1905), politician in Prince Edward Island, Canada
- James H. Nicholson (1916–1972), film producer
- James Mervyn Nicholson, better known as Skonk Nicholson (1917–2011), South African rugby union coach
- James Brindley Nicolson (1917–1945), British aviator and recipient of the Victoria Cross
- Jim Nicholson (American politician) (born 1938), former United States Secretary of Veterans Affairs, and chairman of the Republican National Committee
- Jimmy Nicholson (Northern Irish footballer) (1943–2025), Irish footballer
- Jimmy Nicholson (Scottish footballer) (born 1957), Scottish footballer
- Jim Nicholson (Northern Ireland politician) (born 1945), Ulster Conservative and Unionist politician
- Jim Nicholson (offensive lineman) (born 1949), retired American football player
- Jim Nicholson (American football coach) (1906–1983), American football player and coach
- James Nicholson (American businessman) (born 1966), convicted of defrauding numerous investors of millions

== See also ==
- James Nicolson (disambiguation)
