= Robert Cleghorn =

Scottish physician and pharmacologist

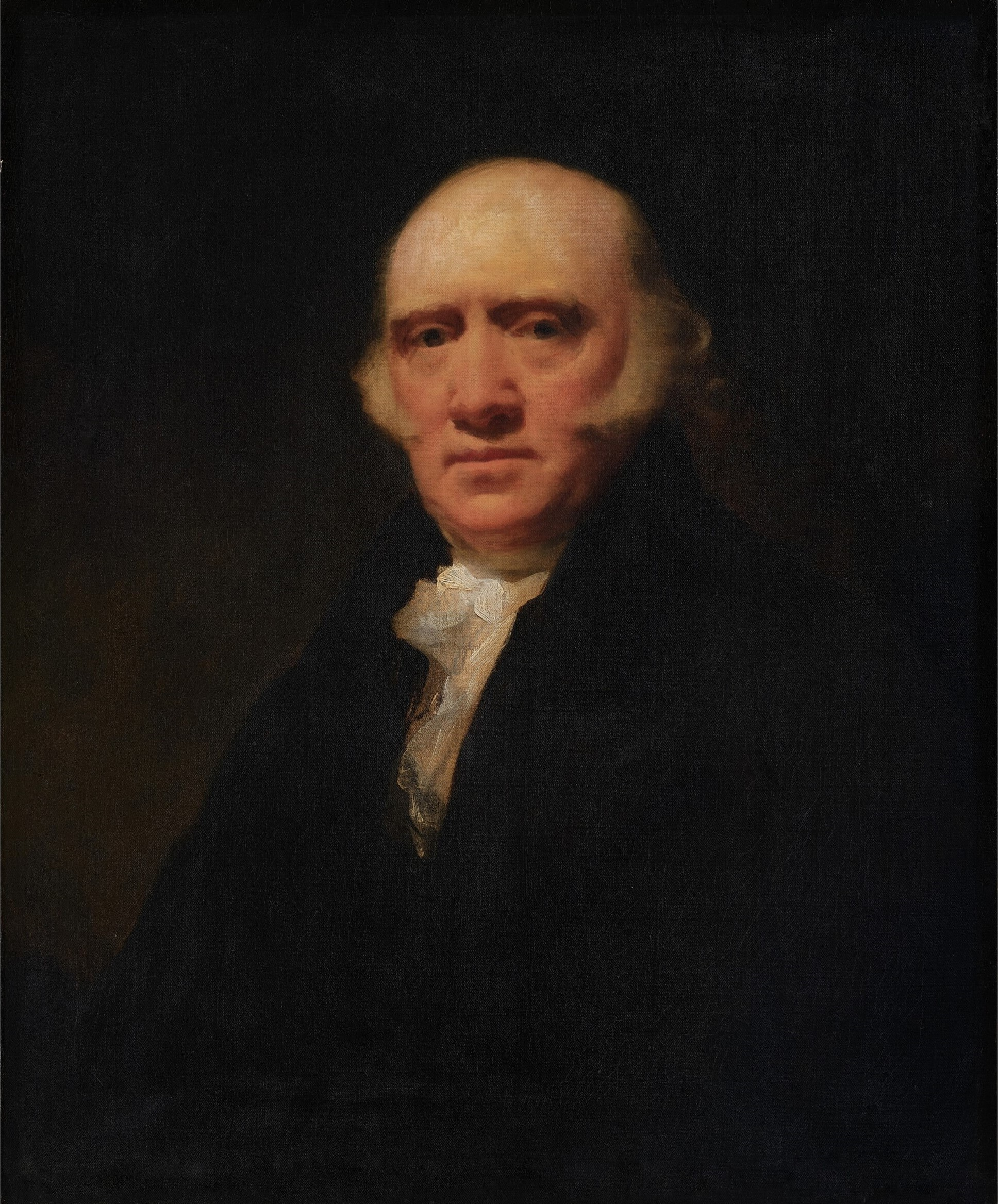
Prof Robert Cleghorn

Robert Cleghorn MD FRSE FFPSG PRMS (1755 – 18 June 1821) was a Scottish medical doctor and pharmacologist.

== Life ==
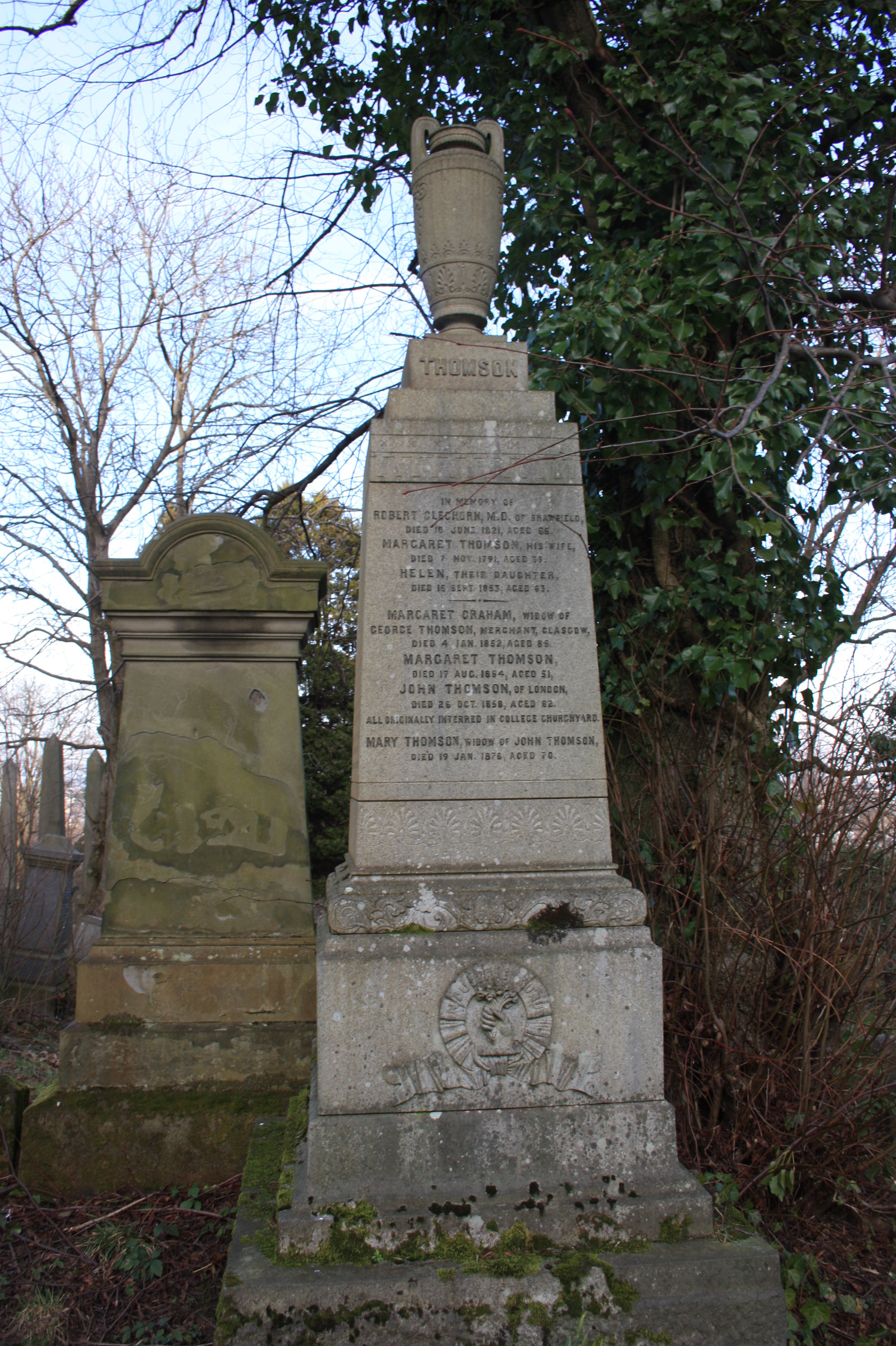
The grave of Rev Robert Cleghorn, Craigton Cemetery

Little is known of his early life. He is thought to have been born around 1755. He studied medicine at the University of Edinburgh, graduating with an MD in 1783. He was in general medical practice as a GP in Glasgow from 1785, then in 1788 began lecturing in medicine, then in 1791 began lecturing in chemistry. In 1818, he was awarded a professorship in chemistry and materia medica at the University of Glasgow, a role continued until his death. At this point he lived at Spruells Land on the north side of the Trongate.

As a physician he worked at the Glasgow Royal Asylum at Gartnavel, and Glasgow Royal Infirmary, previously known as the Old Town Hospital. His position at Gartnavel was filled by Dr John Balmanno.

He was elected a Fellow of the Royal Society of Edinburgh in 1790, his proposers being Andrew Dalzell, Dugald Stewart and James Gregory.

He died in Shawfield House near Rutherglen on 18 June 1821.

He was originally interred in Blackfriars Churchyard, but the body had to be moved in 1875 when a railway was built through the churchyard. He was reburied in Craigton Cemetery with a monument designed by Greek Thomson and sculpted by John Mossman. The graves lies near the south-west corner within the second row from the south path.

== Family ==
He was married to Margaret Thomson (1752–1791). They had a daughter, Helen Cleghorn (1790–1853)

== Positions of note ==
- President of the Royal College of Physicians and Surgeons of Glasgow 1788–1791
- Honorary president of the Royal Medical Society in 1781 and full president in 1783.
- Member of the Glasgow Literary Society
- Fellow of the Society of Antiquaries (Scotland)

== Artistic recognition ==
He was portrayed by Sir Henry Raeburn.
