= John Balmanno =

John Balmanno FRCSPG (c.1770–1840) was an 18th/19th century Scottish surgeon of high-standing in the city of Glasgow. He served two terms as President of the Faculty of Physicians and Surgeons in Glasgow.

== Life ==
Balmanno was born in Glasgow. His father died when he was young and he was supported by his mother who (unusually for the age) was an apothecary on the Trongate. He studied medicine at the University of Edinburgh, possibly under the patronage of John Anderson, founder of Anderson's College, Glasgow, who took anC interest in his life. Balmanno took over the running of the Glasgow apothecary shop around 1790. When Anderson died in 1796 his will, setting up the Anderson College, stated that he wished "Mr Balmanno, druggist, to be Professor of Materia Medica" at the College, however this did not come about.

In 1798 the University of Edinburgh awarded him his doctorate (MD). In 1801 he became a member of the Faculty of Physicians and Surgeons in Glasgow and rose to be its president in a single year.

From 1801 he was a physician at Glasgow Royal Infirmary. He is said to have performed admirable work during the Glasgow typhus outbreak of 1818/9 and he was presented with three silver salvers for this action.

In 1818 he became Physician to the Royal Asylum for Lunatics at Gartnavel in place of Dr Robert Cleghorn. In his role in the asylum he invented Balmanno's Syringe a device to replace force feeding for those on hunger strike. More controversially he used a "whirling chair" which disorientated patients.

He lived his final years at 37 St Vincent Place in central Glasgow.

He died in Glasgow in 1840.

== Publications ==
- Asylum Anecdotes

== Artistic recognition ==
He was portrayed by Thomas Lewis. The portrait is held at Gartnavel Hospital.
