= Craigton Cemetery =

Cemetery in Glasgow, Scotland

Coordinates: 55°50′58″N 4°20′14″W

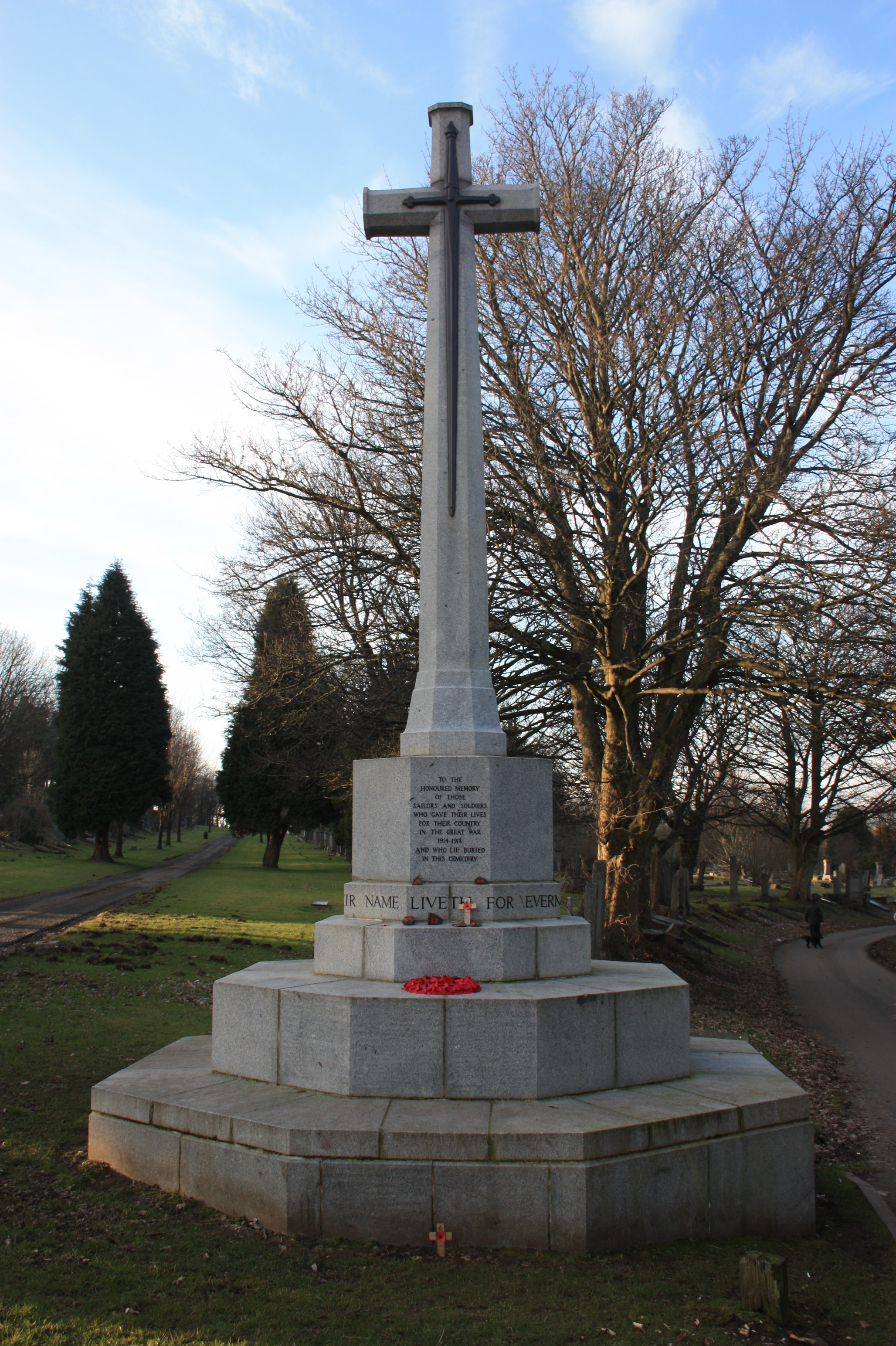
War memorial (Cross of Sacrifice), Craigton Cemetery, Glasgow

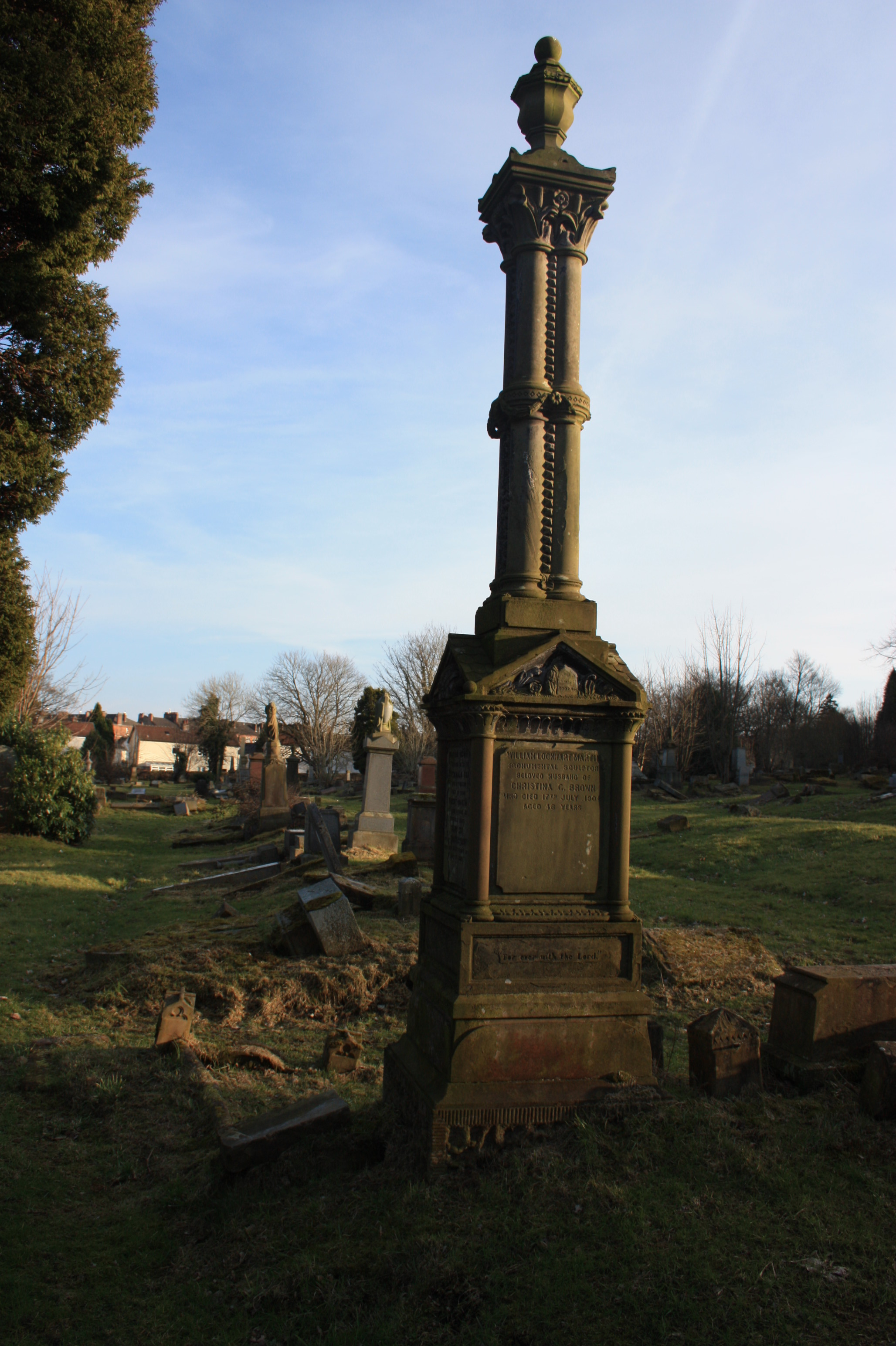
Memorial to William Lockhart Martin, Craigton Cemetery

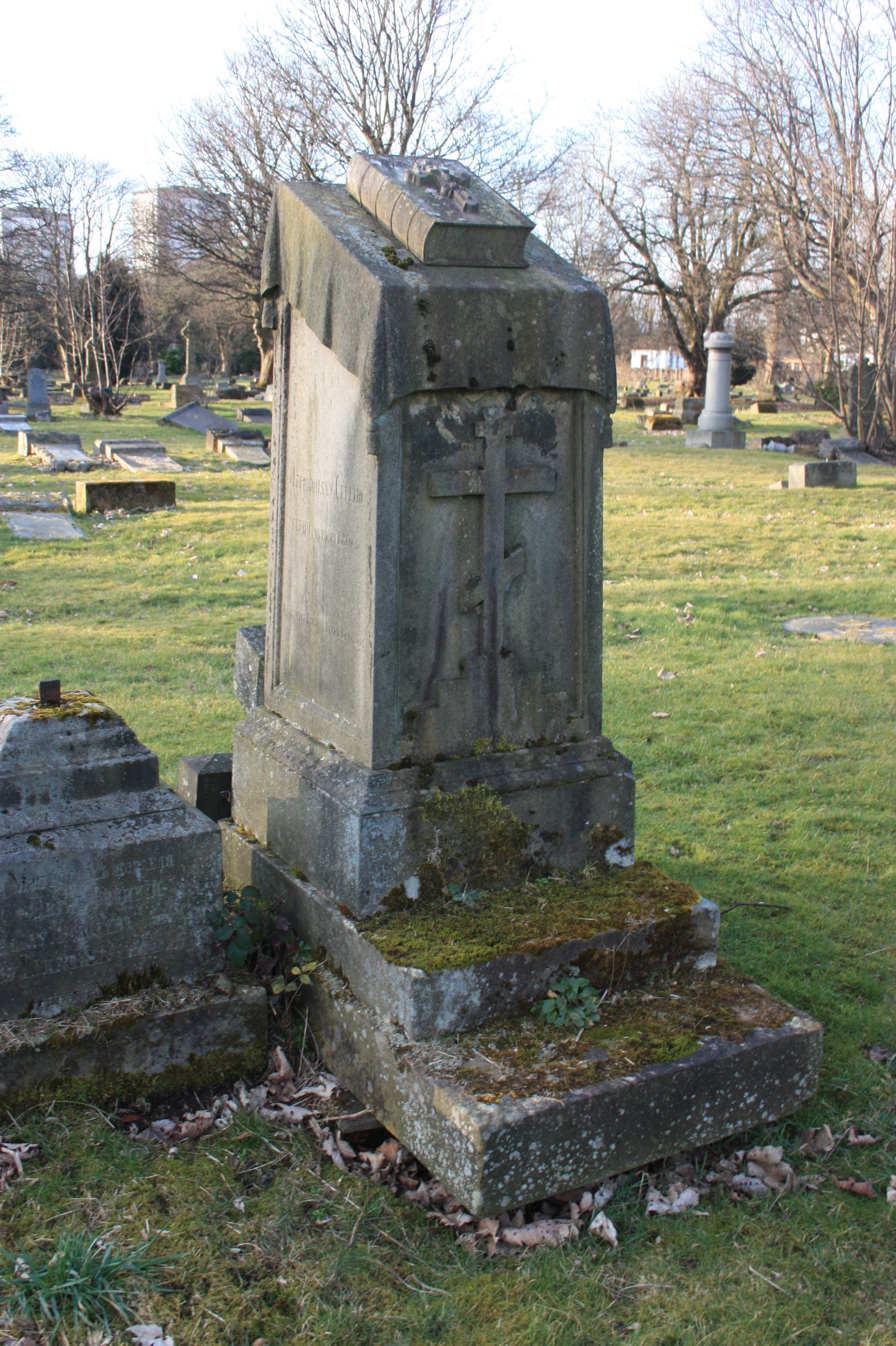
Monument to Rev Sergious, Craigton Cemetery

Craigton Cemetery is a cemetery in south-west Glasgow dating from the mid-19th century. It stands on Berryknowes Road.

The cemetery has a Jewish section containing 230 graves. The cemetery also contains 251 commonwealth war graves from the First and Second World Wars.

Partly due to the proximity to Ibrox Stadium, the cemetery has strong links to Rangers Football Club.

The original entrance is to the south-east. A new entrance to the north was created to serve the crematorium. The north half of the cemetery is relatively flat and open. The south half slopes fairly steeply south to north and is more densely filled with monuments.

Vandalism in the cemetery is widespread.

== History ==
The cemetery was established in 1871 by the Craigton Cemetery Company to serve south-west Glasgow, Govan and Partick. The original cemetery extended to 30 acres on lands of Wester Craigton and Merrylands, previously owned by Robert Urquhart. The main shareholder was Thomas Reid (1831–1900) of the Govan Dye Works. Fellow directors included Morris Pollok (1831–1899) and William McOnie (1813–1894) (later Lord Provost of Glasgow).

The first burial took place on 9 June 1873, being that of seven-year-old Isabella Guthrie.

From 1876 to 1877, various reburials took place moving earlier graves from Blackfriars Churchyard, which was removed for railway improvements.

From 1881, the cemetery also permitted Jewish burials in their own section known as the "Bet Chaim" (House of Life). This section was closed in 1908.

Craigton Crematorium lies close to the northern boundary and was added in 1957 to a design by James Maitland Steel. It is currently run by the Co-op Funeralcare.

The cemetery contains over 150,000 persons.

== Notable Interments ==
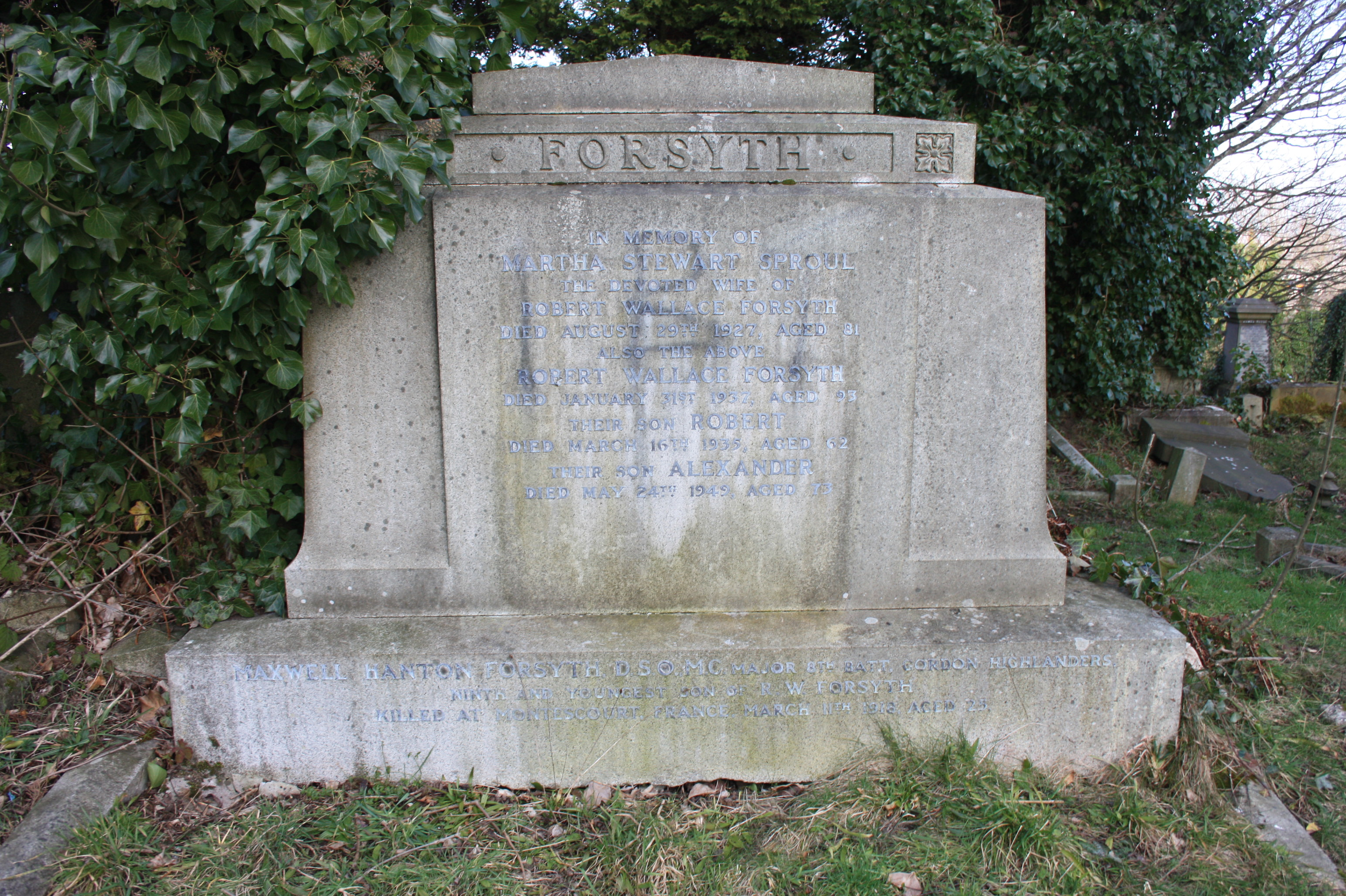
The grave of R W Forsyth, Craigton Cemetery, Glasgow

- Sir John Anthony (1862–1935) – Provost of Govan 1904 to 1908
- Andrew Brown (1825–1907) – ship designer and Provost of Renfrew
- Joseph Buchanan (1864–1932) – Director and Chairman of Rangers Football Club
- Dr Robert Cleghorn (1755–1821) – memorial by Greek Thomson reinterred here in 1875
- Robert Hunter Craig (1839–1913) MP for Govan and industrialist
- John Simpson Crowther (1845–1914) – Arctic explorer with Benjamin Leigh Smith's expeditions of 1880 and 1881
- Memorial to the 124 victims of the SS Daphne which sank in 1883 – around 50 victims are buried here
- Robert Wallace Forsyth (1843–1937) – founder of R. W. Forsyth's department store chain across Scotland
- Tom Gracie (1889–1915) – soldier with the Royal Scots and footballer with Heart of Midlothian Football Club
- Rev John Harper (1872–1912) – the minister who famously preached to the doomed as the Titanic sank (memorial only)
- Victims of the 1902 Ibrox disaster
- James Kirkwood (1848–1922) – Provost of Govan
- Robert Murray Laird (1938–1972) – killed in the Vietnam War
- Frank Lilley (1883–1939) – founder of Lilley Construction Company
- George Lindsay (1828–1890) – Provost of Kinning Park
- Lt Robert McBryde (1883–1918)- recipient of the Albert Medal
- Charles Mackay (1850–1919) – whisky distiller, joint founder of Whyte & Mackay
- Peter McNeil (1857–1901) and his older brother William Bain McNeil (1855–1908) – co-founders of Rangers Football Club
- William McOnie (1813–1894) – Lord Provost of Glasgow from 1883 to 1886
- John McPherson (1868–1926) – footballer with Rangers Football Club
- John Marr (1835–1916) – Provost of Govan 1901 to 1904
- Sir Thomas Mason (1844–1924) – builder
- Daniel Miller (1825–1888) – civil engineer
- Alexander Mitchell (1857–1883) – footballer
- James Nicholson (1822–1897) – poet and amateur botanist
- Ella Osbourne (1884–1915) – memorial to a victim of the doomed RMS Lusitania
- Sir William Pearce, 1st Baronet (1833–1888) – businessman and politician – monument designed by Honeyman and Keppie
- John Ure Primrose (1847–1924) – Lord Provost of Glasgow from 1902 to 1903 and Chairman of Rangers Football Club and his wife Lady Joanna Primrose (1869–1913) philanthropist
- Thomas Reid (1831–1900) – Chairman of Nobel Explosives and Provost of Govan 1869 to 1872
- William Reith (1832–1898) – renowned soldier
- Rev Sergious (1816–1881) – this unusual monument is modelled on a lectern from the Russian orthodox church- Sergous died during an outbreak of fever on board the ship "Peter the Great" whilst docked in Govan
- Colin Sinclair (1879–1957) – architect
- Very Rev John Smith DD FEIS (1854–1927) Moderator of the General Assembly of the Church of Scotland in 1922/3
- Rev William Sprott (1827–1875) – monument by Greek Thomson
- Bill Struth (1876–1956) – Manager of Rangers Football Club under John Ure Primrose as Director
- James Whitton (1850–1925) – park designer
