= James Nicolson =

James Nicolson may refer to:

- James Nicolson (bishop) (died 1607), Moderator of the General Assembly of the Church of Scotland & Bishop of Dunkeld
- James Brindley Nicolson (1917–1945), English aviator, recipient of the Victoria Cross
- James Nicolson (priest) (1832–1889), Dean of Brechin
- Jamie Nicolson (born 1971), Australian boxer

== See also ==
- James Nicholson (disambiguation)
