= John Anthony (provost) =

Scottish businessman (1862–1935)

- Born: 9 February 1862
- Died: April 10, 1935 (aged 73); Craigton Cemetery, Dumbreck
- Education: Stewarton Public School
- Occupation: businessman
- Title: Scottish Liberal Association (Chairman)
- Spouse: Agnes McCrae

Sir John Anthony JP (1862–1935) was a late 19th and early 20th century Scottish businessman who served as Provost of Govan from 1903 to 1906. He was actively involved in the Temperance movement.

He was Chairman of the Scottish Liberal Association.

== Life ==
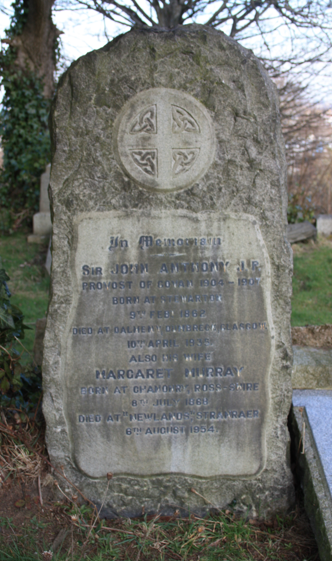
The grave of Sir John Anthony, Craigton Cemetery, Glasgow

He was born in Kirkford near Stewarton in Ayrshire on 9 February 1862 to Andrew Anthony, a shoemaker, and his wife Agnes McCrae. He was educated at Stewarton Public School.

In 1875 he began working as a message boy (delivering telegraphs) based at Stewarton Railway Station. Around 1880 he transferred to Pollokshaws and around 1882 moved to Govan, still working for the railway, but as a cashier.

In 1889 he became a partner in Cockburn Brothers of Govan, iron and steel product manufacturers at St James Ironworks on Helen Street in Govan. In 1897 David Cockburn died and Anthony then became sole proprietor. He expanded the business into South Africa.

He joined Govan town council as a councillor in 1893, becoming a magistrate in 1897 and being elected Provost in 1904. His tasks involved unveiling the statue of Isabella Elder in Elder Park in Govan in 1906. He was succeeded in 1908 by David McKechnie.

He was knighted by King George V in 1916.

He died on 10 April 1935 at Dalmeny House: 13 Torridon Avenue in Dumbreck. He is buried in the crowded south section of Craigton Cemetery.

== Family ==
He was married to Margaret Murray (1868-1954).
