= RW Forsyth =

Department stores in Scotland, 1872–1983

Coordinates: 55°57′11″N 3°11′31″W

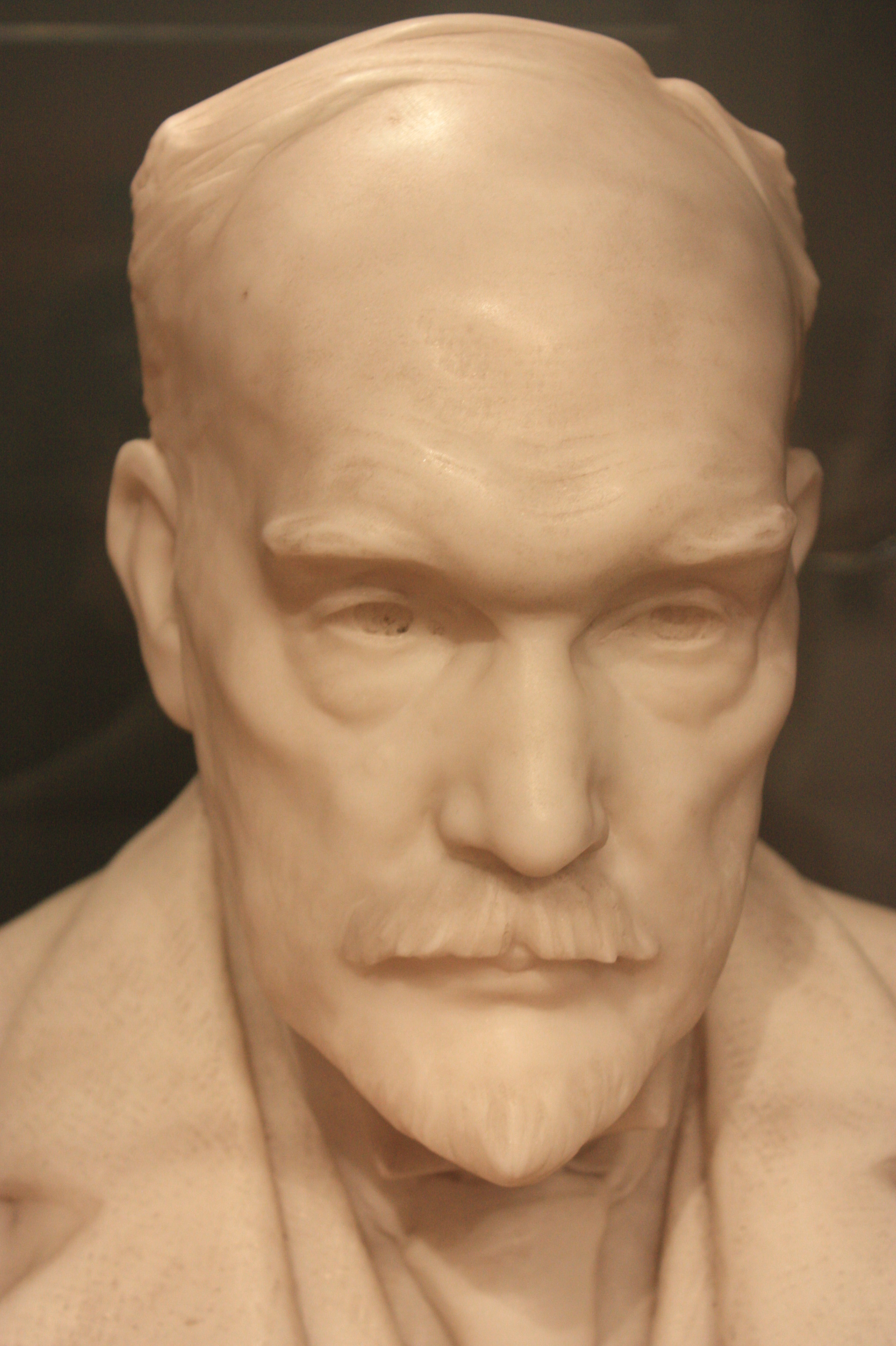
R W Forsyth by William Reid Dick, People's Palace, Glasgow

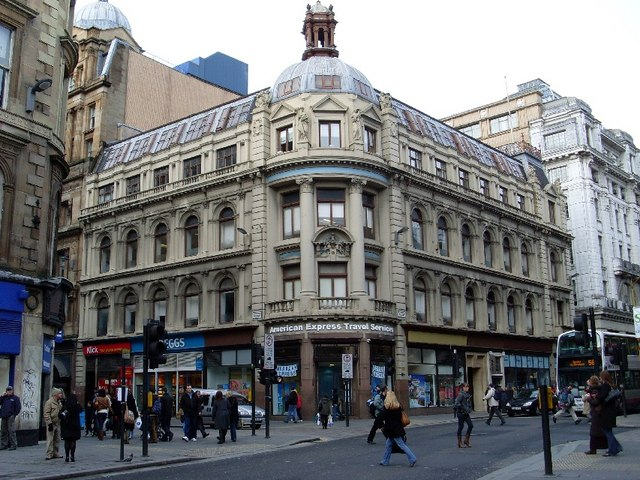
The original R W Forsyth at the corner of Renfield Street and Gordon Street in Glasgow built at a cost of £25,000.

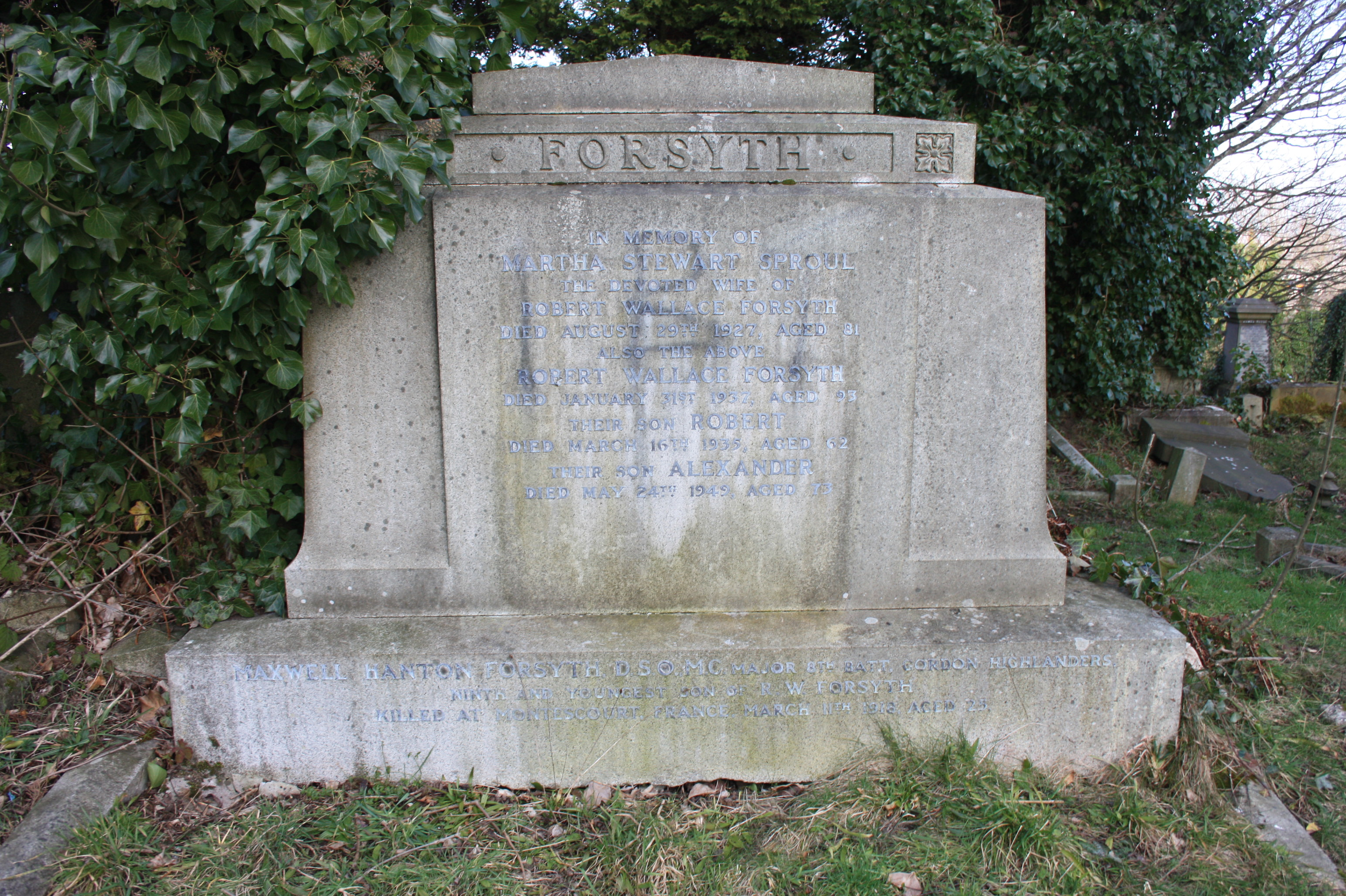
The grave of R W Forsyth, Craigton Cemetery, Glasgow

By Appointment to HM The Queen

R. W. Forsyth, often just called Forsyth's, was a group of department stores founded in Glasgow in 1872. The business expanded into Edinburgh in 1906 and London in 1925.

== Robert Wallace Forsyth ==
Robert Wallace Forsyth was born Inveresk, East Lothian in 1843, one of ten children of Mary Wallace and Alexander Forsyth (1806–1891), whose family had farmed near Eddleston, Peeblesshire in Scotland since the 1700s.

Forsyth was married to Martha Sproull and they had thirteen children. He died on 31 January 1937 and is buried in Craigton Cemetery in south-west Glasgow.

Forsyth was famous for founding his eponymous chain of departments stores, RW Forsyth, in 1872. A marble bust of Robert Wallace Forsyth (1843–1937), by Sir William Reid Dick R.A., which was formerly on the stairwell of the Glasgow Headquarters in Renfield Street, is on display at the People's Palace in Glasgow.

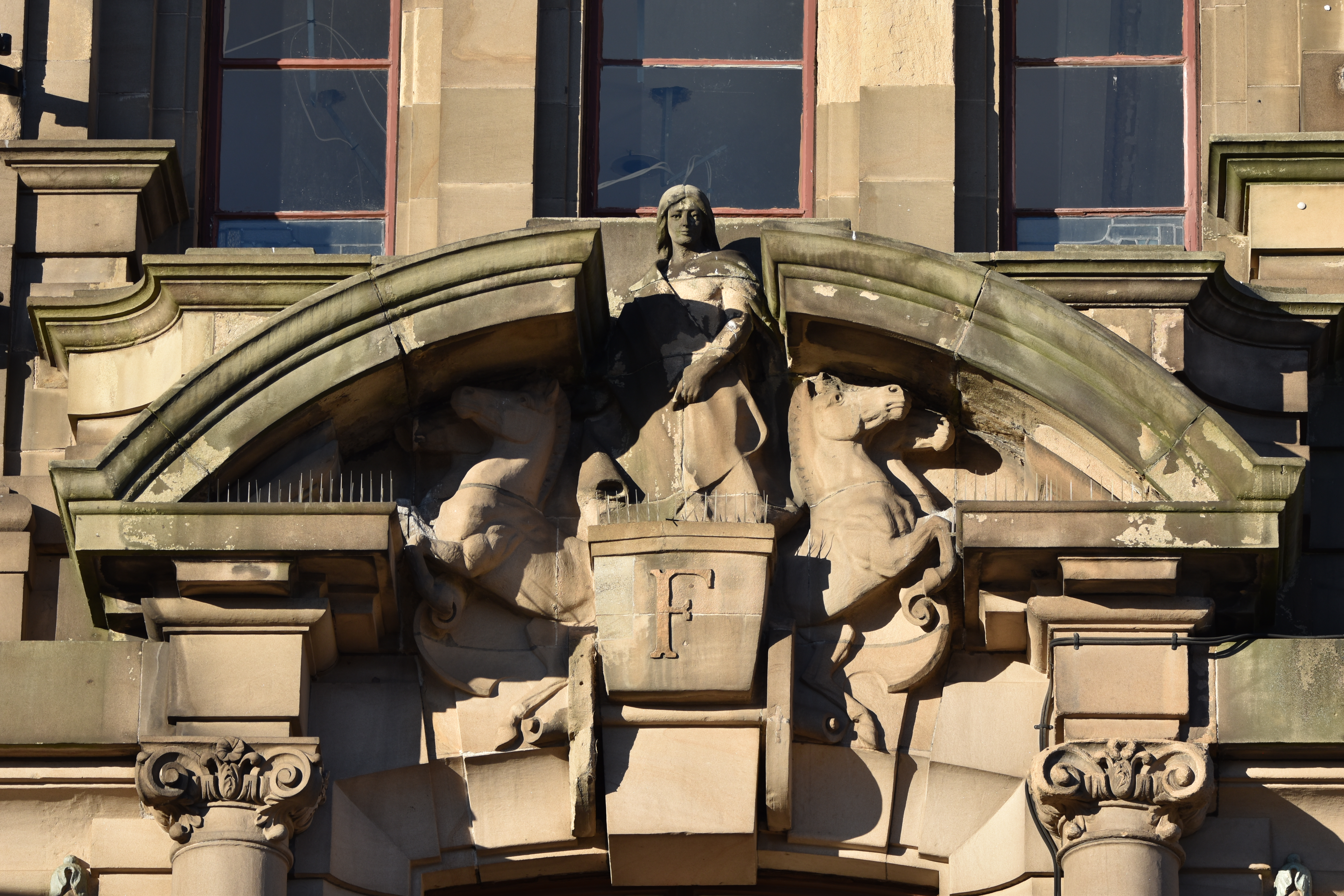
Princes Street, Edinburgh

== History ==
=== Beginnings ===
60-70 Gordon Street, Glasgow

Forsyth moved to Glasgow in 1862 where he set up business selling socks, gloves and shirts on Renfield Street, opposite Central Station. The business was highly successful, and he assembled the remaining buildings on the corner of Renfield Street and Gordon Street. In 1896, Forsyth commissioned John James Burnet to create a fashionably stylish department store. The roof was raised a storey and mansarded, the corner taken out, a Corinthian dome with a caryatid attic inserted, and the interior replanned diagonally, leading to a magnificent quarter-circle stairwell on which the clientele could venerate the bronze bust of the founder. The new department store opened in the late 1890s at a cost in excess of £25,000, and was the first major store in Glasgow to have electric lighting throughout.

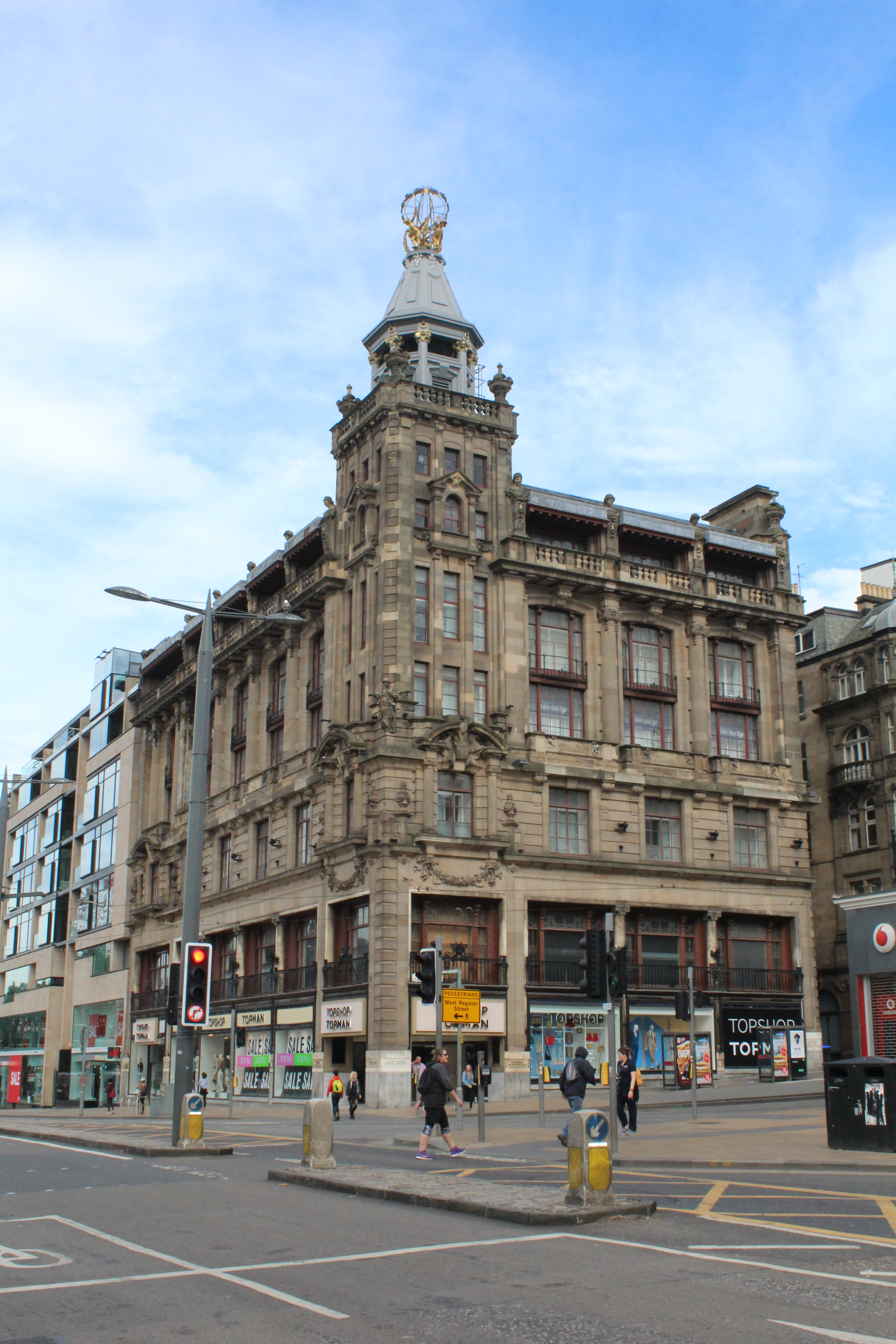
RW Forsyth, Princes Street, Edinburgh

=== Expansion ===
26-30 Princes Street and 3 St Andrew Square, Edinburgh

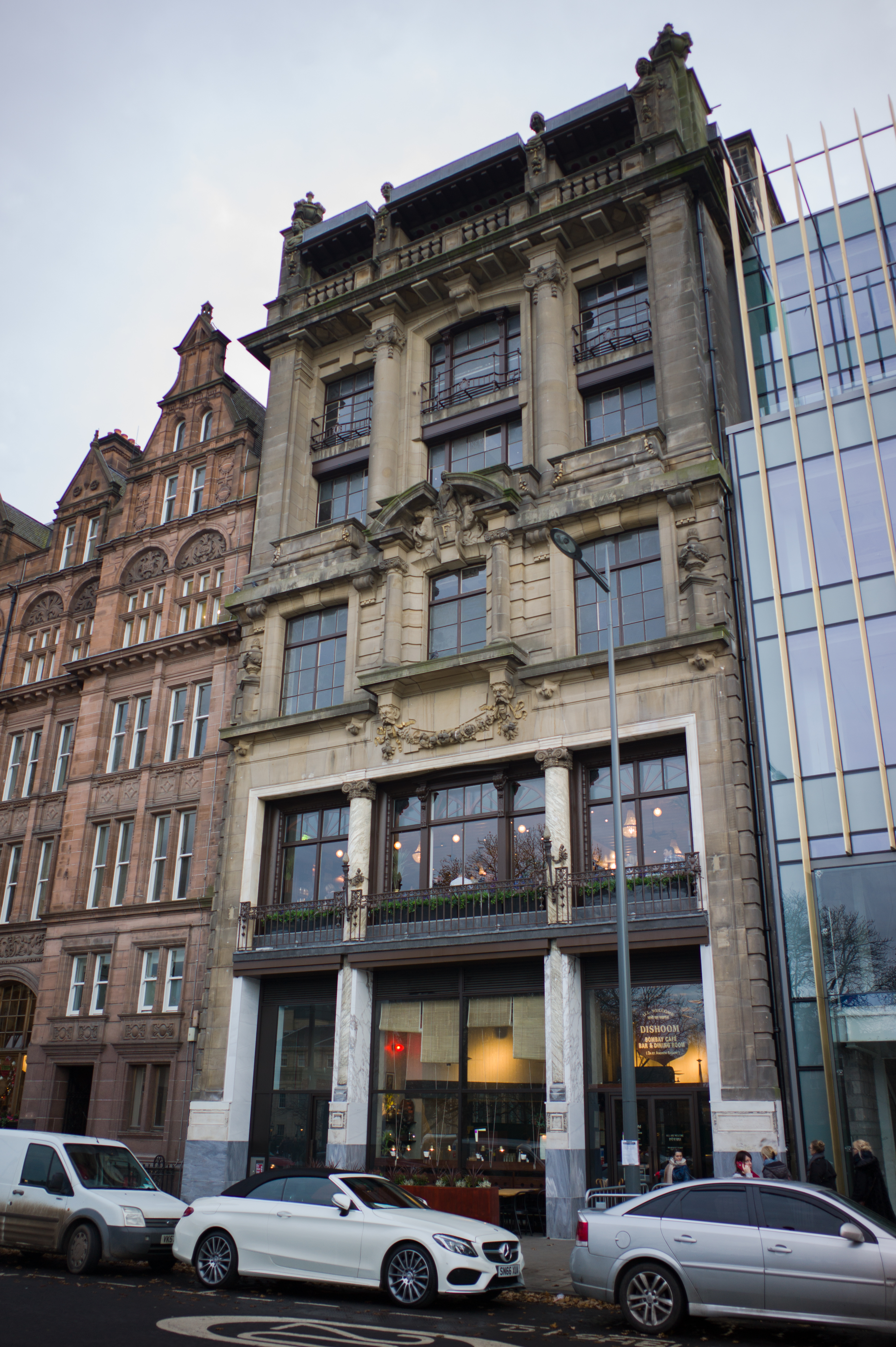
3 St Andrew Square, Edinburgh. Designed for RW Forsyth by the eminent practice of Burnet, Son and Dick, 1923-5

In 1906 he expanded the business with a second major store constructed on Princes Street, Edinburgh, opposite Waverley Station. The second building, erected as a flagship store, was again designed by the Scottish architect John James Burnet. This was the first steel framed building in Scotland. The facade is decorated with Neo-Baroque sculpture. At the corner on a ledge above the third floor, and directly above the entrance doors, stands a figure of a woman who holds a sewing machine. Also at the corner, and forming part of windowed aedicules at the second floor, are flanking tympanum relief sculptures of a longhaired figure driving a quadriga with an F (for Forsyth) on the front of the chariot. Running along an eaves gallery at the top of the building is a series - six on the Princes Street side, and four on the South St Andrews Street side - of term figures with fantastical heads by the Scottish sculptors William Birnie Rhind and William Reid Dick. On top of the corner tower sits a gigantic partly gilded steel sculpture of armillary sphere decorated with the signs of the zodiac and with three dancing putti, designed by the English sculptor Gilbert Bayes. An extension, including a bridge over Meuse Lane and a new building at 3 St Andrew Square, designed by the architects Burnet, Son & Dick, was built in 1925.

Vigo House, Regent Street, London

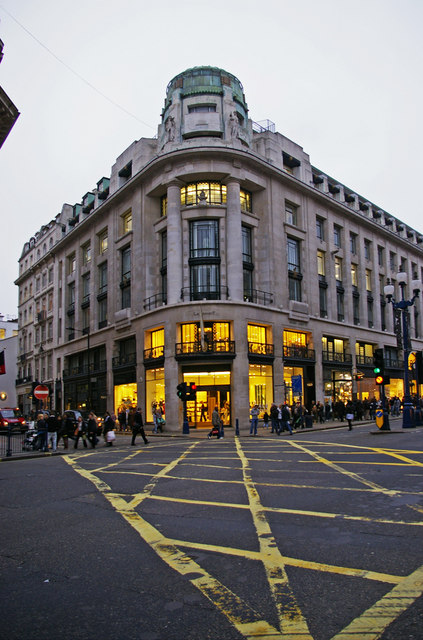
RW Forsyth, Regent Street, London

In 1925 a site was acquired at the junction of Regent Street and Vigo Street in London, and a new building was constructed bearing the historic name 'Vigo House'. Designed by Messrs Sir John Burnet, Tait and Lorne, this building was said to rank among the finest examples of British shop architecture at the time.

The Wallace Scott & Co Tailoring Institute, Cathcart, Glasgow

Built in 1912 and extended in 1919, the Wallace Scott & Co Tailoring Institute was founded by Robert Wallace Forsyth to make clothing for the R.W. Forsyth Department Store empire. This purpose-built factory, located in Cathcart on the south side of Glasgow, was designed by the architect J.J. Burnett in partnership with Norman Aitken Dick. With a design inspired by the American 'garden factory' model, as well as modern architectural features, the company also established significantly progressive employment practises providing extensive rest, recreational and entertainment facilities for its large workforce. The Wallace Scott manufactured the famous hard-wearing Dexter outdoor clothing range, and employed 800 staff.

The factory closed in the 1950s and the building then became the administrative headquarters for Scottish Power. The site is currently being re-developed for housing. The facade of the original factory is retained within the development.

=== Decline & closure ===
In 1981, the company chairman reported in a statement to shareholders that "with the further increases in all overheads, particularly a 40% increase in business rates to £111,395 in 1981/82, there is no way, short of capital development, in which the company can expect to show other than a further loss in the immediate future." In August 1981 the directors were considering 10 bids for the properties in Glasgow and Edinburgh with the top offer said to be £10.5 million despite speculation that the stores could realise £12m to £16m. The number of employees at the time was 252, down from 270 the year before.

"As stores throughout the country journeyed down-market over the years to meet the needs of the consumers, Forsyth's remained aloof on a pedestal of traditional service and taste. Now, despite the recession, many people have more money to spend than ever before. They choose to dispose of it in the high street multiples; Arnott's, Marks and Spencer, Littlewoods and British Home Stores".

RW Forsyth Ltd was still in family ownership when it closed in 1983 after 111 years of trading. The buildings were sold for development.

== The Removal and Return of Forsyth's Globe ==
The iconic 3 tonne gilded globe which site on top of the Edinburgh store, has for over a century has been part of Edinburgh's famous skyline. The globe was removed by Arcadia, the building's owners, on safety grounds in 2012. Following the reluctance of Arcadia to reinstate the globe, a petition was launched which resulted in Edinburgh Council serving Arcadia with an enforcement notice to reinstate the globe which forms part of a Category A building within a world heritage site. After pressure from heritage bodies, the local authority and the public, the globe was finally restored and reinstated in June 2016

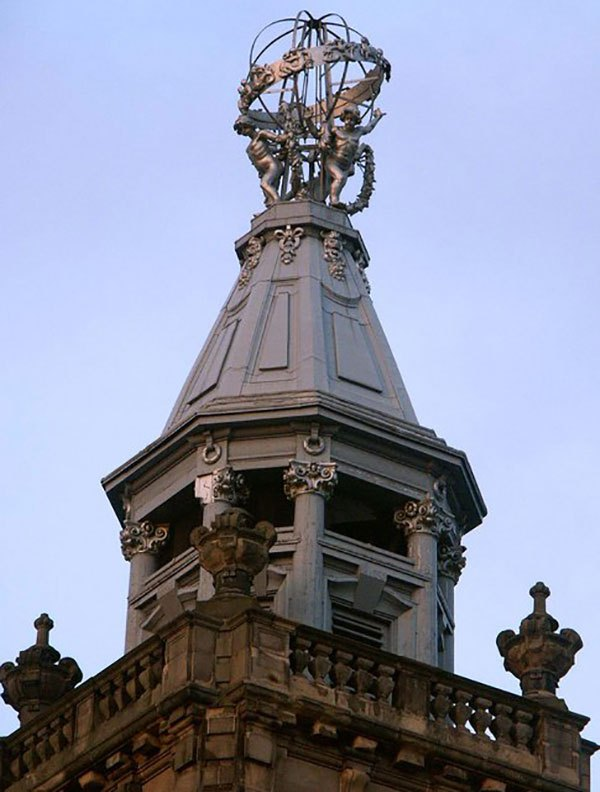
Forsyth's Globe, Princes Street, Edinburgh

Mr RW Forsyth, as featured in 'The Bailie' in 1897

== Architectural Gallery ==
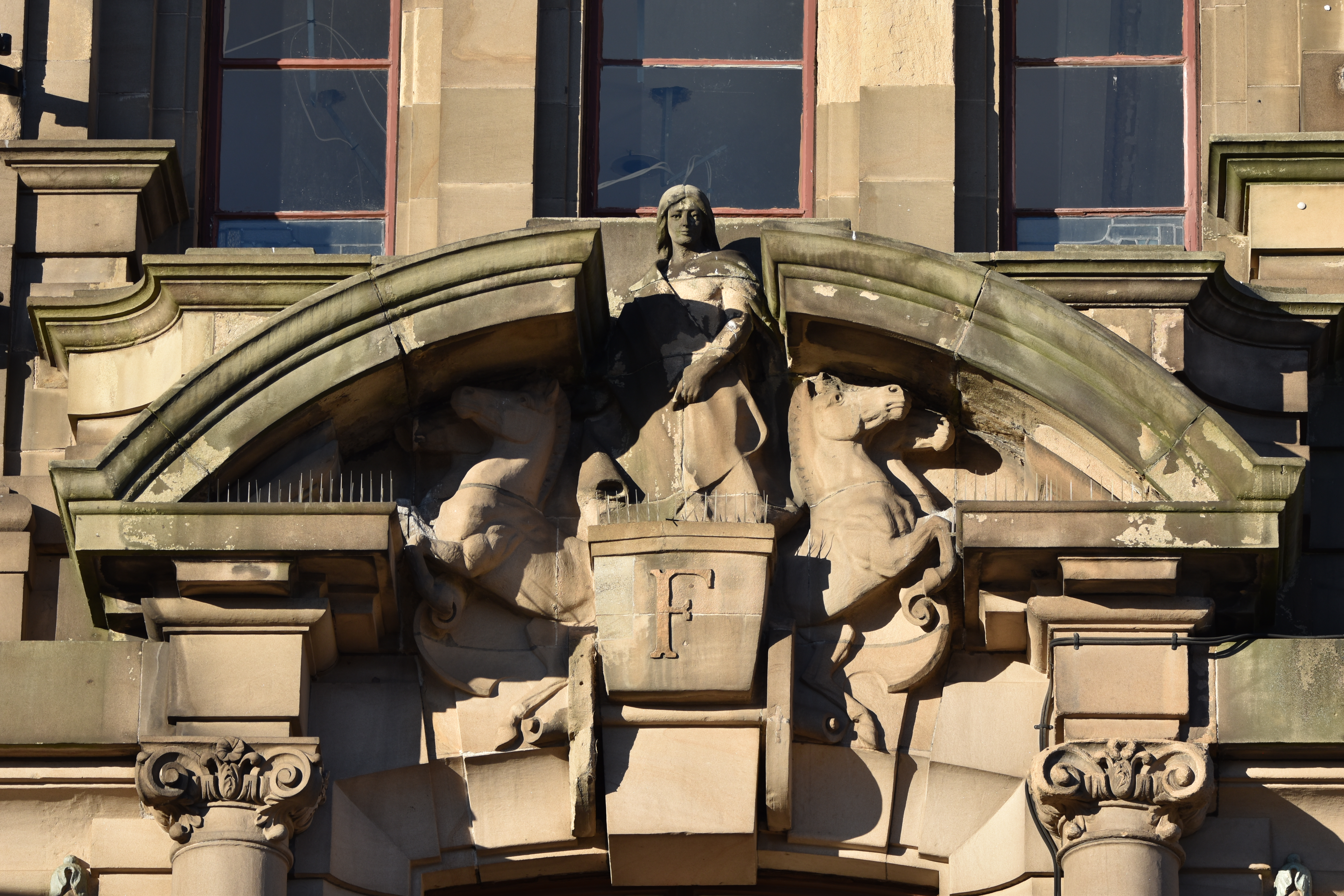
Figure driving a quadriga, Princes Street facade, Forsyth's

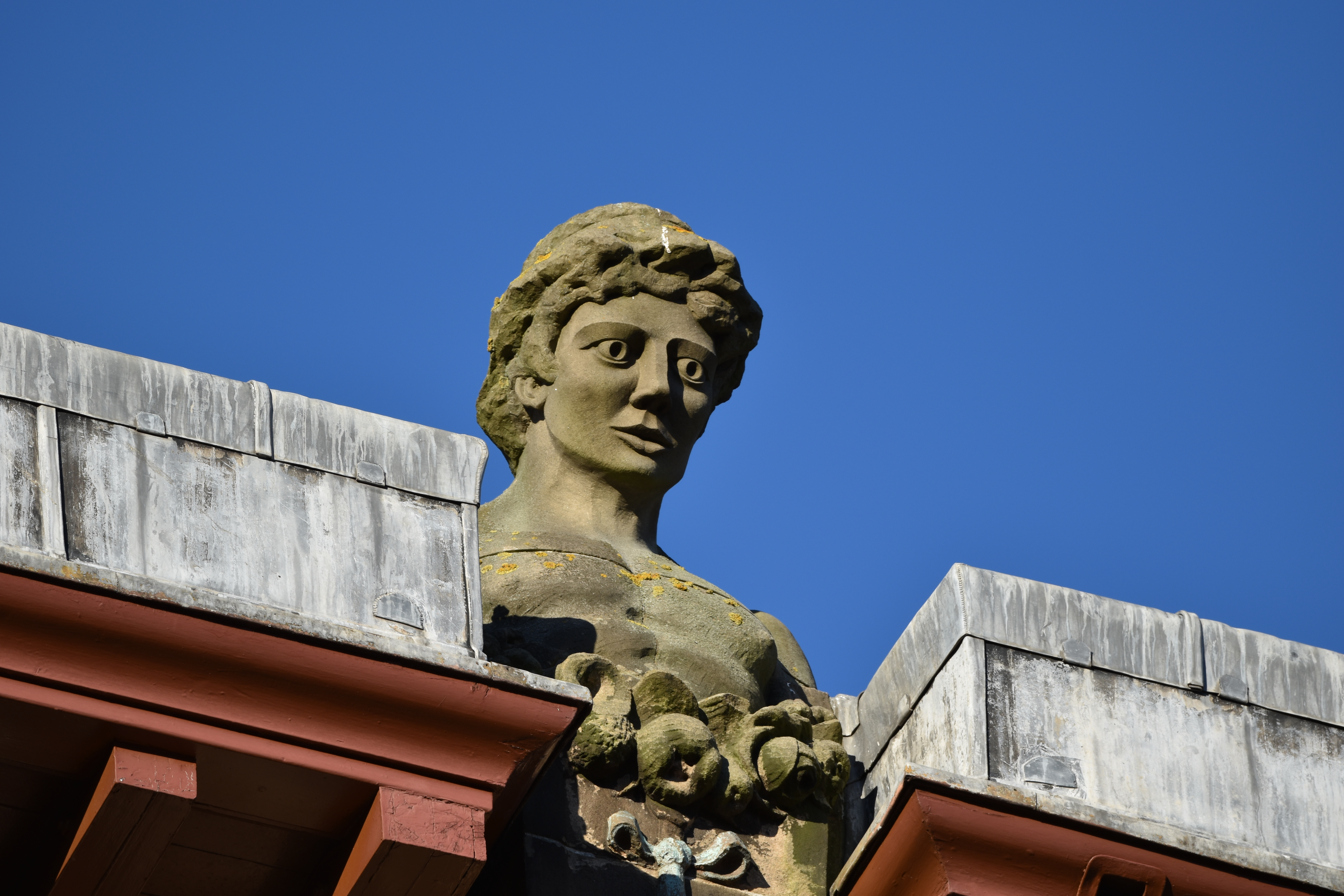
Term figure no. 3, Princes Street facade, Forsyth's

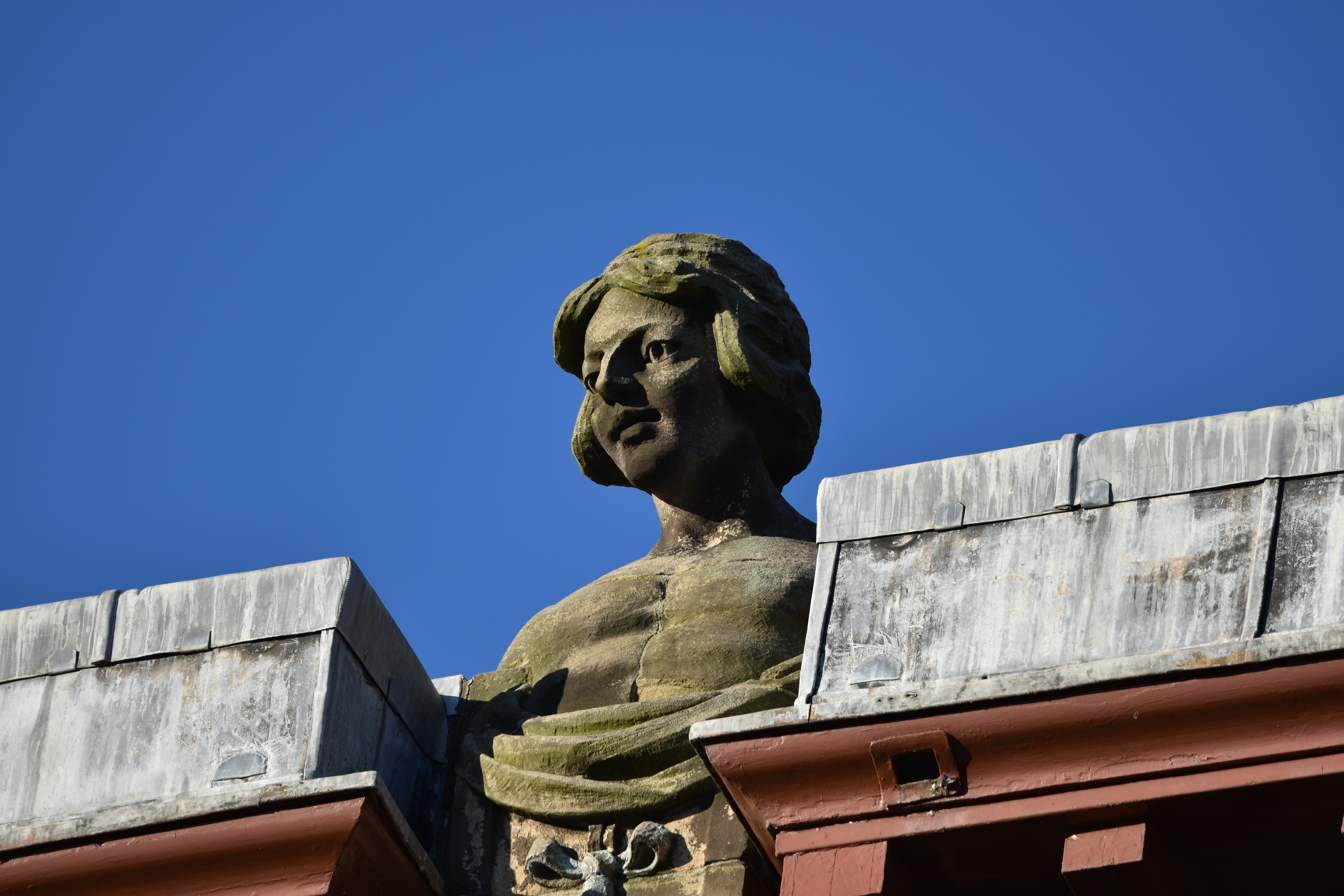
Term figure no. 4, Princes Street facade, Forsyth's

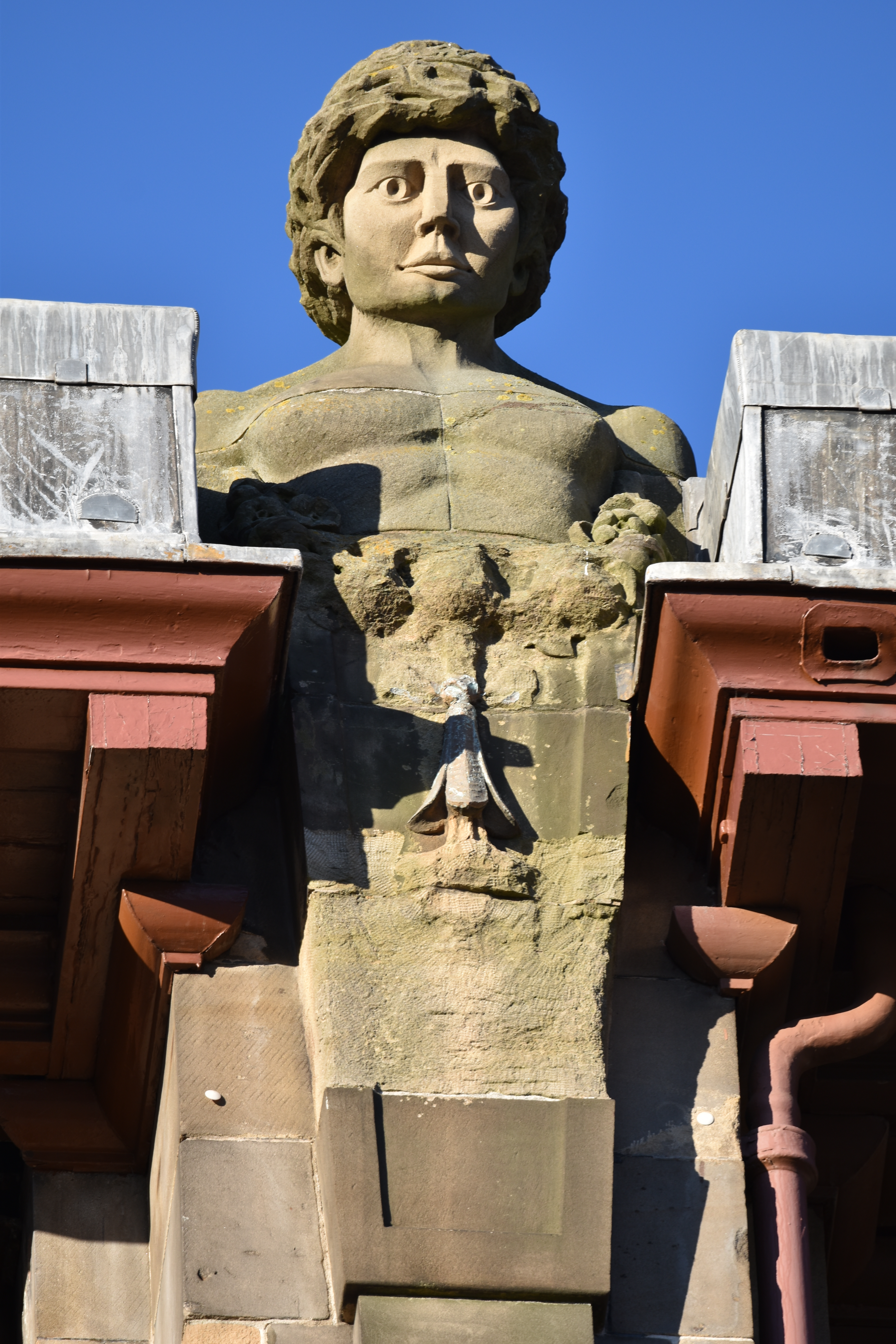
Term figure no. 5, Princes Street facade, Forsyth's

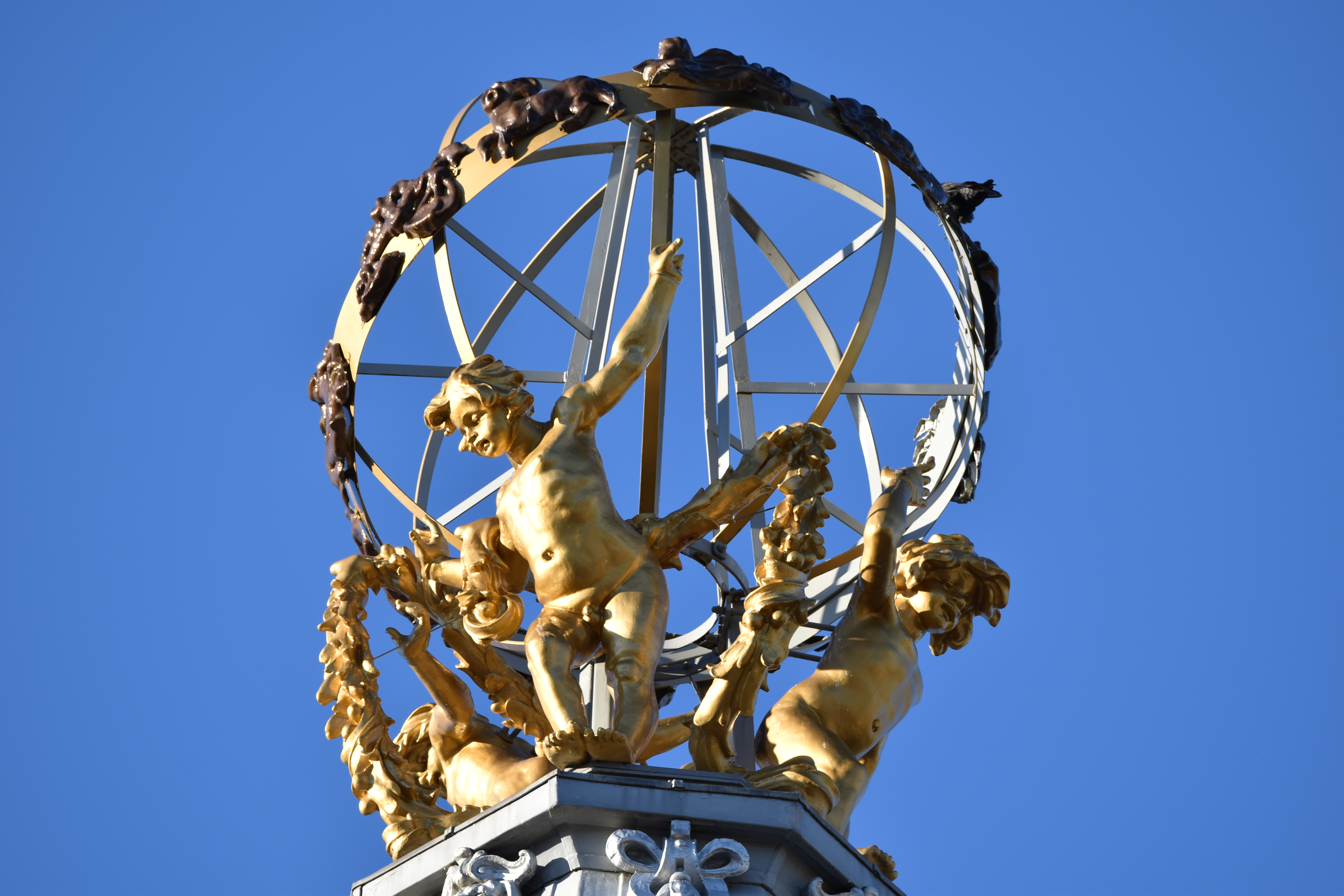
Sculpture of armillary sphere with zodiac and three putti, Forsyth's

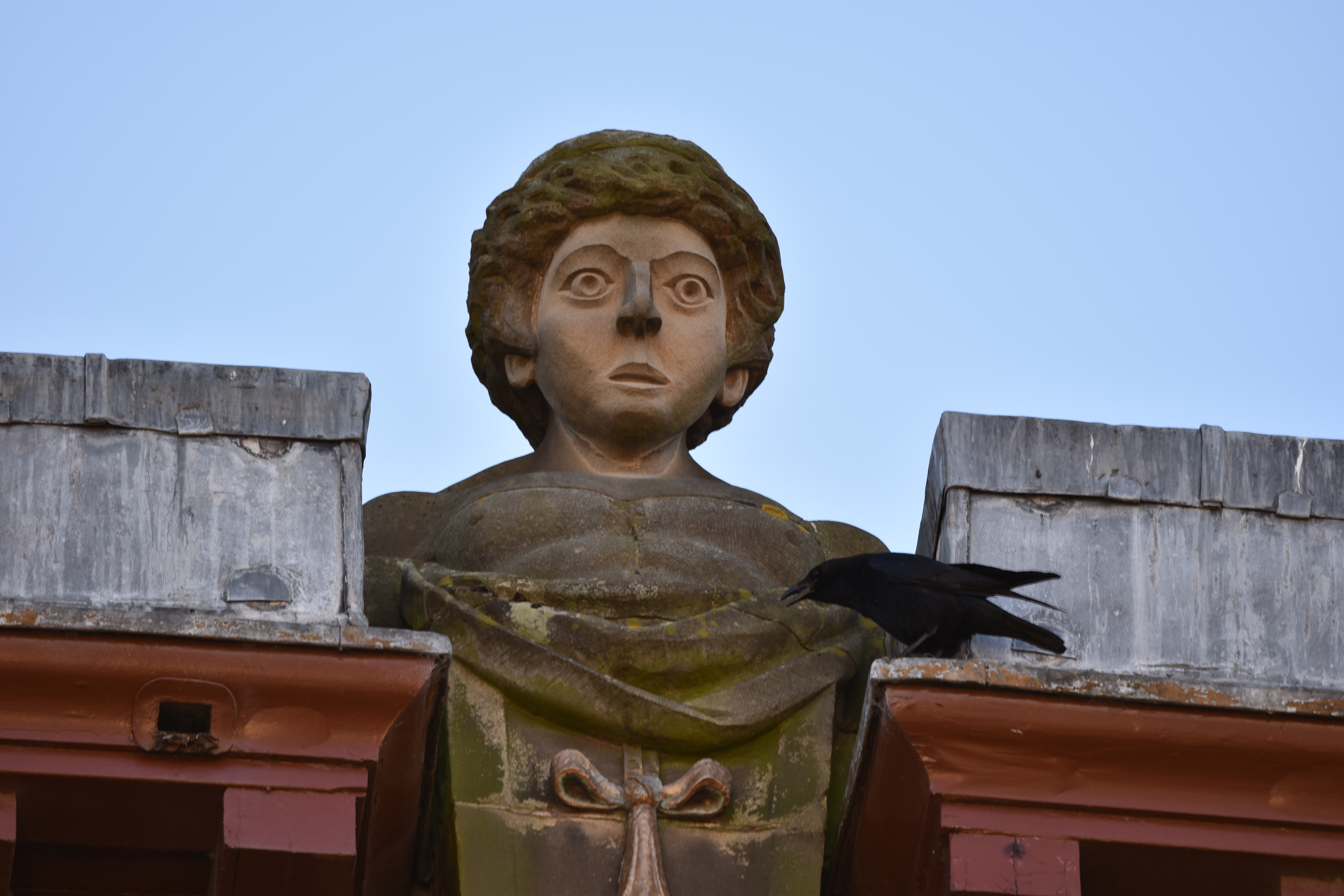
Term figure no. 2, South St Andrew's Street façade, Forsyth's

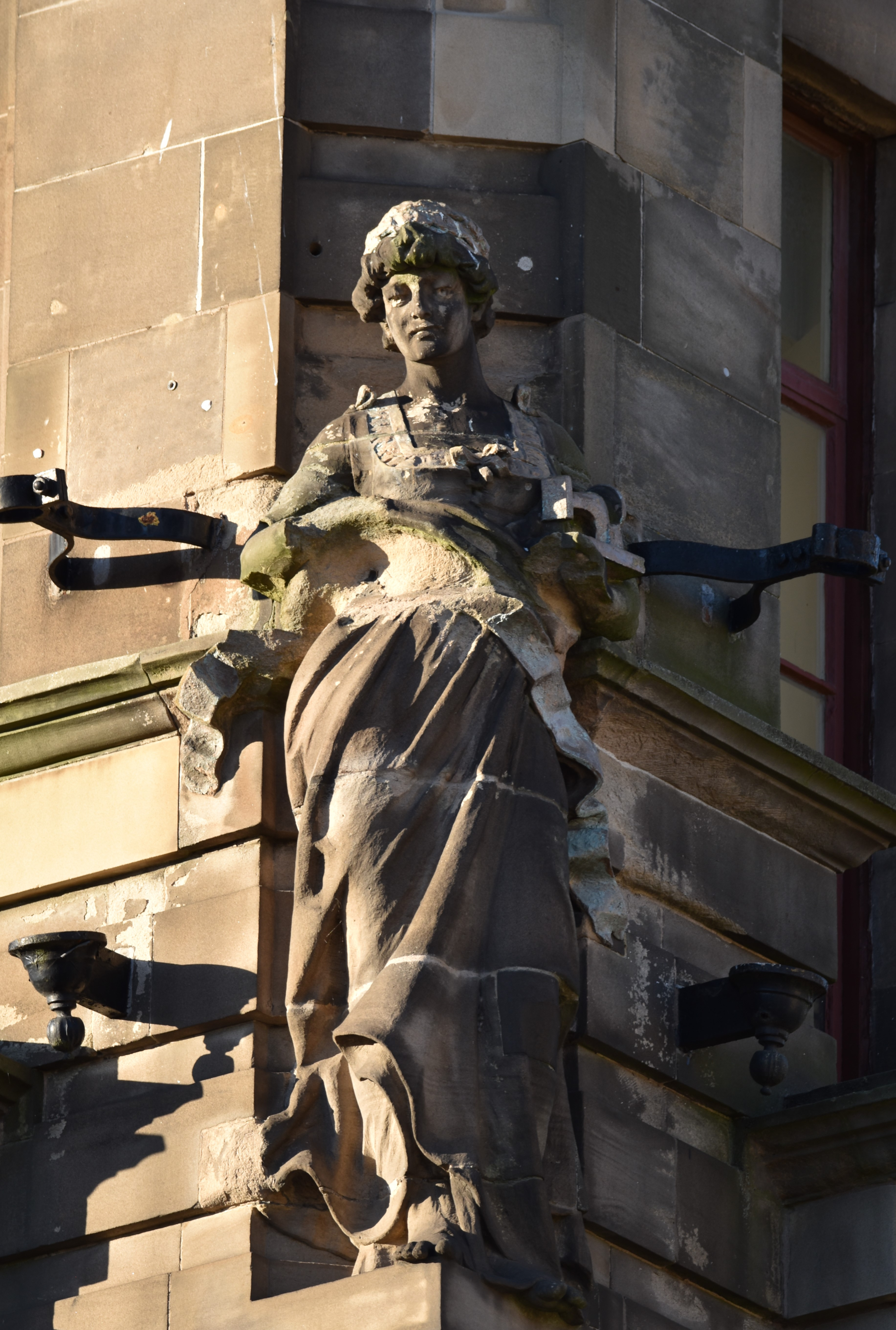
Woman holding a sewing machine, Forsyth's, corner of Princes Street and South St. Andrew's Street
