= SS Daphne =

A number of steamships have been named Daphne, including:

- SS Daphne (1883), which sank at launch with high loss of life
- SS Daphne (1920), torpedoed and sunk by U-69 in 1941
