= William McOnie =

Scottish merchant

Sir William McOnie DL LLD (1813–1894) was a Scottish merchant who served as Lord Provost of Glasgow from 1883 to 1886.

== Life ==
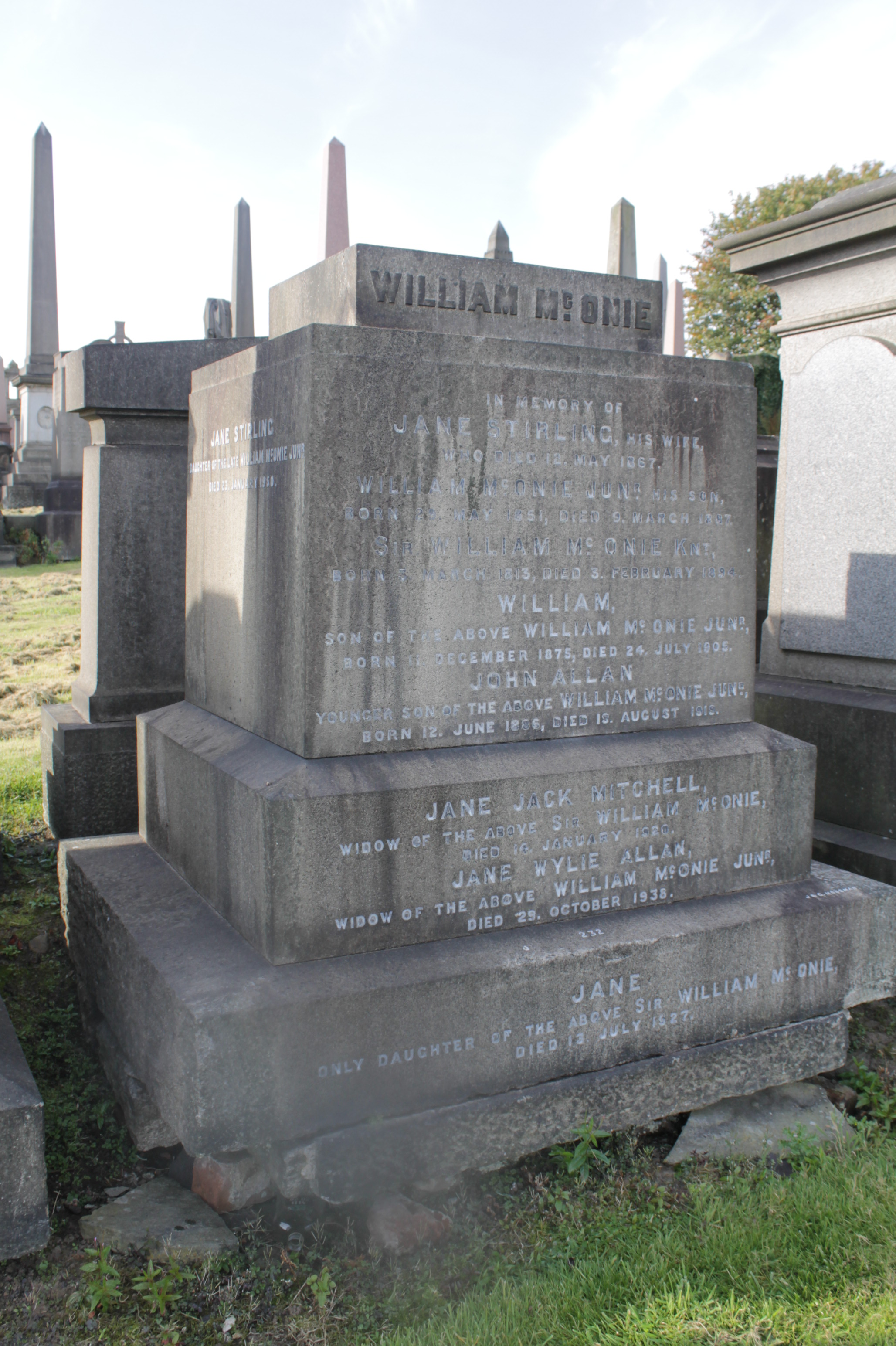
The grave of Sir William McOnie, Glasgow Necropolis

He was born in Port of Menteith on 3 March 1813 the eldest of three brothers.

In 1840 he set up business with his brother Peter as a victualler on Main Street in the Cowcaddens district. Peter died in 1850 and in 1851 he joined his other brother, Andrew, at 1 Scotland Street in Tradeston as "W & A McOnie" engineers and millwrights. William was then living at 27 Waterloo Place, Kingston, Glasgow. The census of that year describes him as a "brass founder". He specialised in machinery for sugar refinery and plantation machinery.

He joined the Glasgow town council in 1867.

In 1871 he was one of the original directors of Craigton Cemetery Company. By 1881 he was living at "Heath Bank" on St Andrews Road in the Kinning Park district. By then he was employing 252 people in his foundries. He was also Chairman of the African Steam Navigation Co and a Director of Fairfield Shipbuilding and Engineering Company.

In 1883 he was elected Lord Provost of Glasgow. He was knighted by Queen Victoria at Blythswood in 1888. He gifted a set of stained glass windows to Pollokshields Church.

He died at Heath Bank on 3 February 1894. He is buried in Glasgow Necropolis. The grave lies in one of the north-south rows in the south-east section of the upper plateau. He also has a memorial in Craigton Cemetery.

== Family ==
He was married to Jean or Jane Stirling (1818-1867) from Renton, Dunbartonshire. They had one son, also William McOnie, and daughter, Jane.

Following Jane's death in 1867 he married Jane Jack Mitchell (1829-1920), daughter of Thomas Mitchell and Florence 'Flora' Kerr, in Tradeston in 1868. She is buried with him in the Glasgow Necropolis.

His son William McOnie Jr. (1851-1887) predeceased him.

== Artistic recognition ==
Whilst in office as Lord Provost he was portrayed by the then young George Reid RSA, one of his earlier commissions.
