= SS Daphne (1883) =

Ship which sank moments after her launching

History

United Kingdom
- Name: SS Daphne
- Builder: Alexander Stephen and Sons, Linthouse, Glasgow
- Yard number: 279
- Launched: 3 July 1883
- Fate: Foundered on launching; Later raised, repaired and put into service

General characteristics
- Type: Passenger-cargo vessel
- Tonnage: 449 GRT
- Length: 176 ft (54 m)
- Beam: 25 ft (7.6 m)
- Propulsion: 2-cylinder compound diagonal steam engine

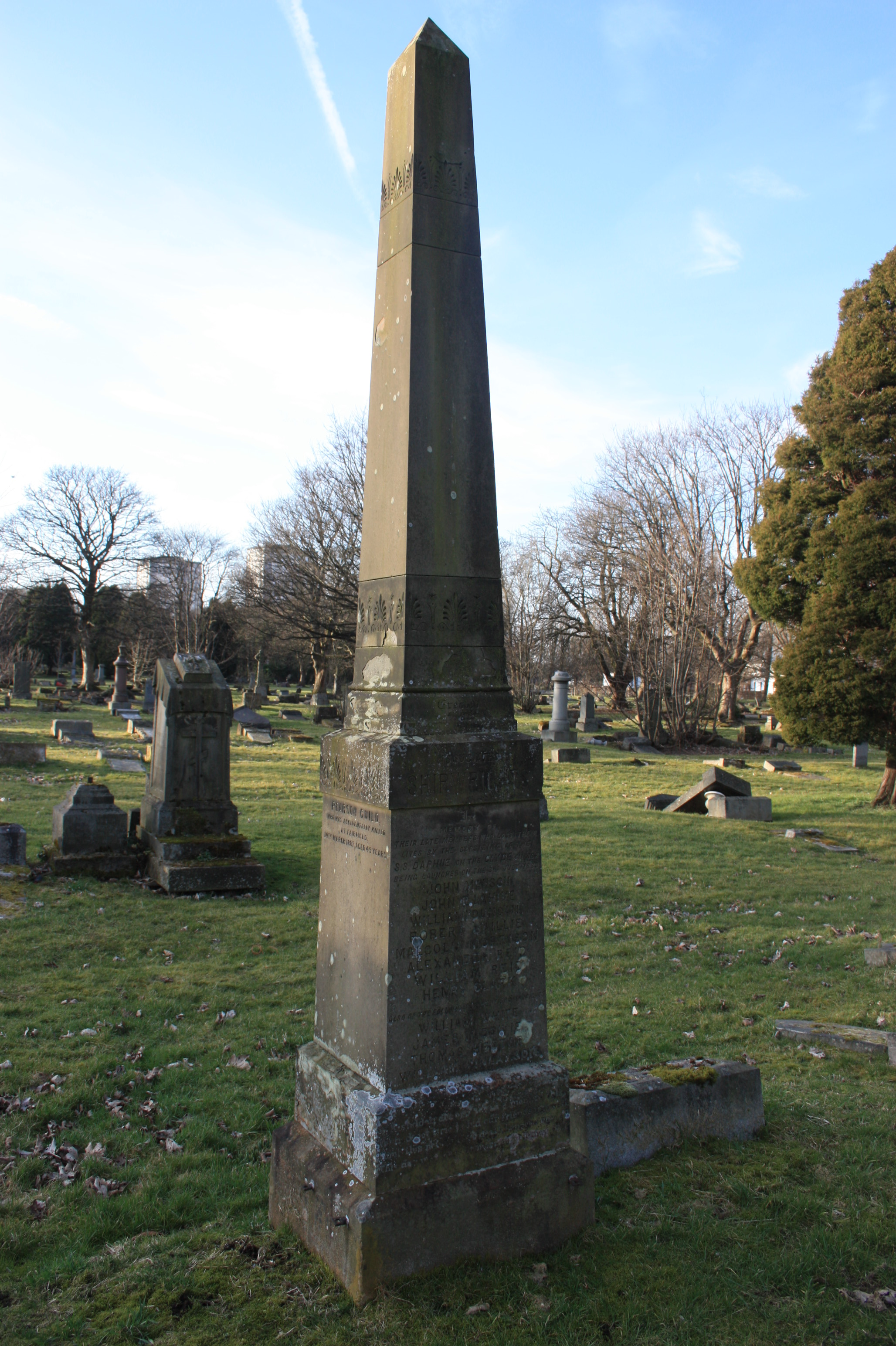
Memorial to the victims of SS Daphne, Craigton Cemetery

SS Daphne was a ship which sank moments after her launching at the shipyard of Alexander Stephen and Sons in Govan, Glasgow, Scotland, on 3 July 1883.

== Background ==
Around 200 workmen were on board the ship at the time it was launched, ready to begin fitting out work as soon as she was properly afloat. According to the usual practice during a launching, anchors were attached by cable to each side of the ship. As the Daphne moved into the river, the anchors failed to stop the ship's forward progress. The starboard anchor moved only six to seven yards (5.5 to 6.5 metres), but the port anchor was dragged 60 yards (55 metres). The current of the river caught Daphne and flipped her over onto her port side, sinking her in deep water.

124 people died including many young boys. 70 lives were saved. It took more than a fortnight for the bodies of those who died to be recovered.

== Inquiry ==
An inquiry was held afterward; the shipyard owners were held blameless, which led to claims of a cover-up. The cause of the disaster was reported to be little initial stability combined with too much loose gear and too many people on board.

One of the outcomes of the disaster was the limiting of personnel aboard to only those necessary for mooring the ship after the launch.

The Daphne was later raised, repaired, and renamed the Rose.

== Memorials ==
The principal memorial to those killed on the Daphne is in Craigton Cemetery where around 50 of the victims are buried. It was designed by William Robin and erected in 1885. The monument faces east onto the eastern path and is one of the larger monuments in this section.

Two further and later memorials, to what was known at the time as the "Linthouse Disaster", exist; one erected in Victoria Park, Whiteinch in 1996 and another in Elder Park, Govan.

== See also ==
- List of United Kingdom disasters by death toll
