= Daniel Miller (engineer) =

Daniel Miller (1825–1888) was a 19th-century Scottish civil engineer and inventor remembered as a harbour and bridge-builder.

== Life ==
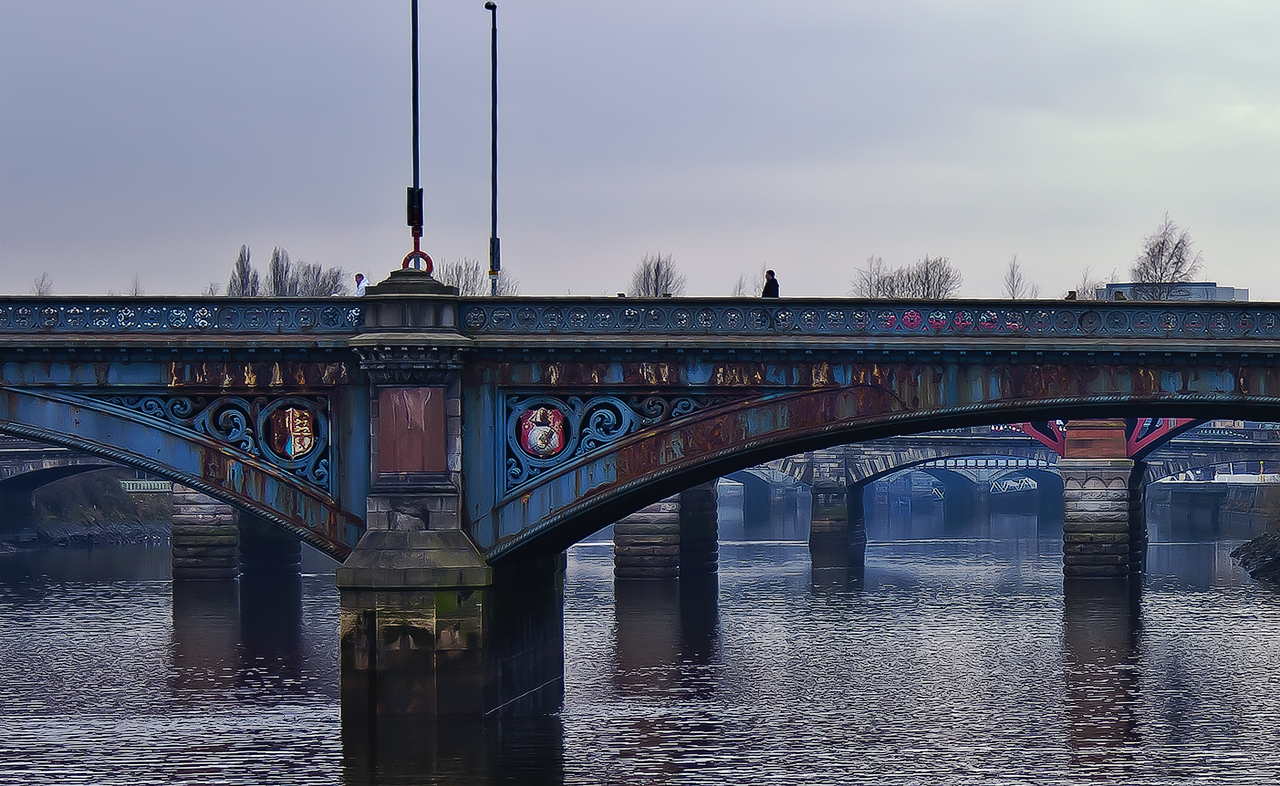
Albert Bridge, Glasgow (detail)

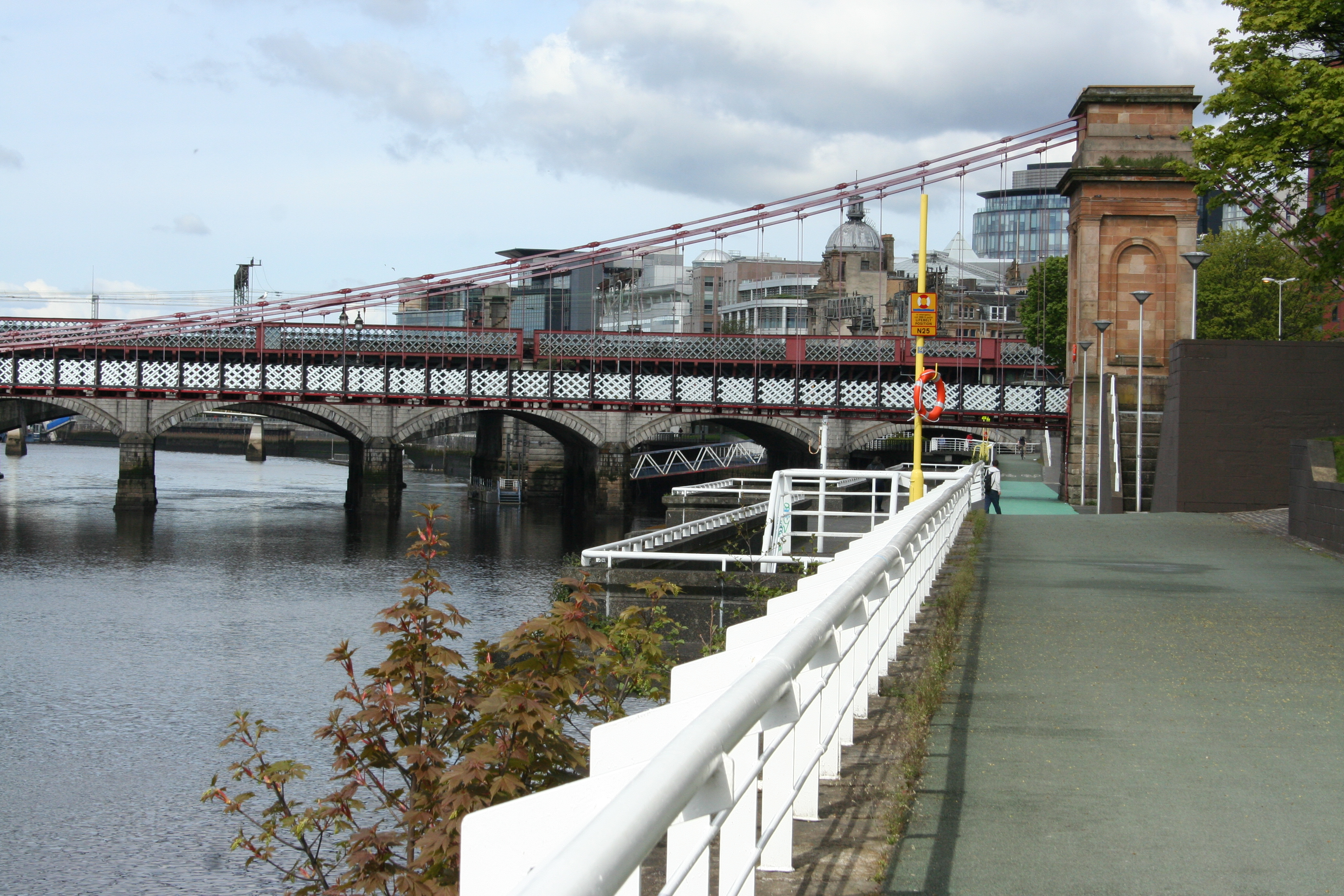
South Portland Street Suspension Bridge

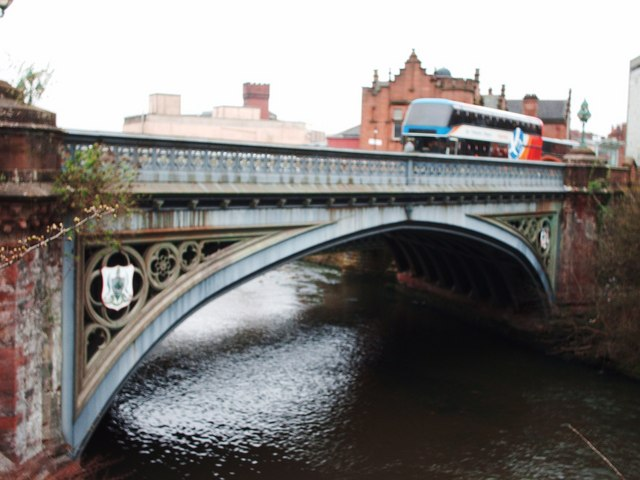
Partick Bridge

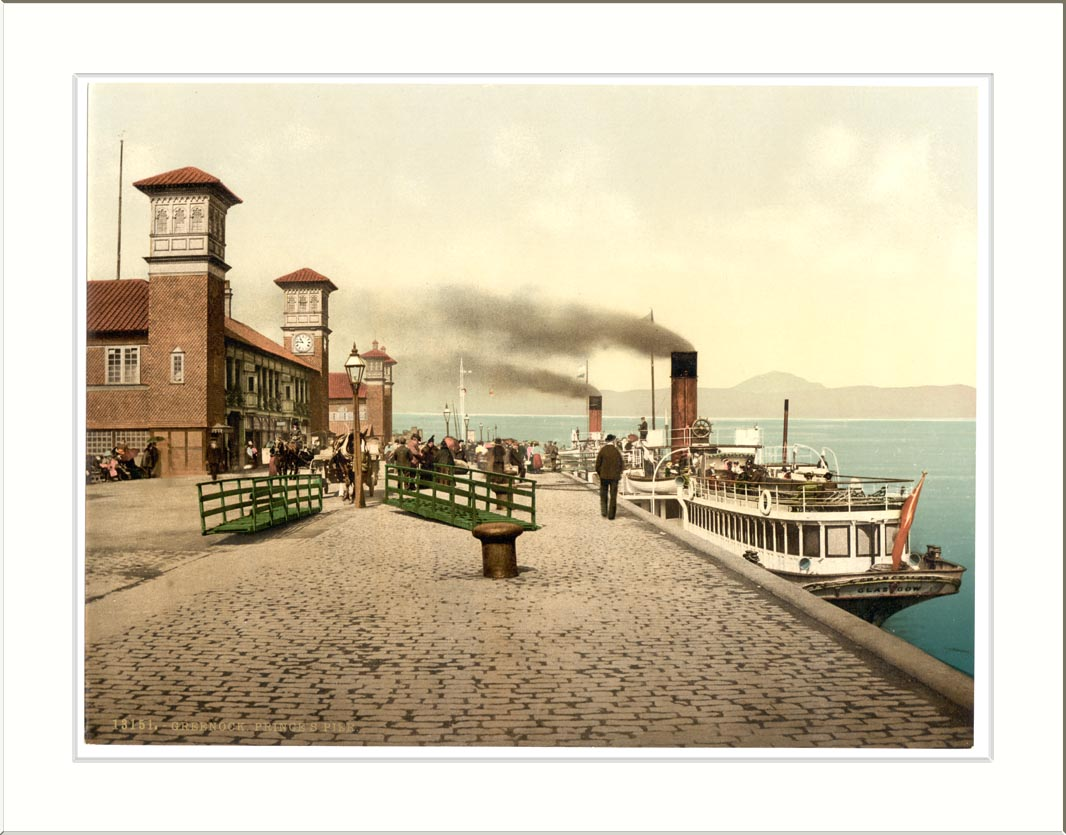
Princes Pier, Greenock

He was born on 9 January 1825 the son of Isabella Paul and Stephen Miller, a coppersmith and brassfounder, living and working at 48 Saracens Lane in Glasgow. The premises was taken over by Walter Macfarlane in 1850 and became world famous as the Saracen Foundry.

Daniel was apprenticed to Gordon & Hill and here he met Robert Bruce Bell (1823–1883) with whom he later went into partnership.

In 1850 he was working without Hill at 13 Robertson Street as Daniel Miller & Co.

Around 1855 he teamed with Robert Bruce Bell with offices at 32 St Vincent Street. By 1860 they are listed as Bell & Miller with Miller then living at 4 Bothwell Street. They were the official engineers to the Clyde Navigation Trust and the Glasgow Bridges Trust.

He died on 28 September 1888 at "Craigburn" on Albert Road in Gourock. He is buried in Craigton Cemetery in south-west Glasgow.

Although both partners were dead, the practice of Bell & Miller continued until the 1890s.

== Principal works ==
- New slip dock with patented hydraulic purchase machinery at Kelvinhaugh for shipbuilder, Robert Black (1849)
- New iron roof over Candleriggs City Hall and Bazaar (1852)
- Graving dock for Tod & McGregor at Meadowside Shipyard in Partick (1856)
- Albert Harbour, Greenock (1863)
- Princes Pier, Greenock (1864)
- Improvements at Port Glasgow (c. 1865)
- Govan Graving Docks no.1 (c. 1865)
- Albert Bridge, Glasgow (1868)
- Improvements to Cádiz harbour (c. 1870)
- Improvements to Belfast Harbour (1871)
- Improvements to Cobh Harbour at Cork (1872)
- Portland Street Suspension Bridge in Glasgow (1872)
- Harbour at Williamstown, Melbourne (c. 1875)
- Partick Bridge over the River Kelvin (1876)
- Harbour at Kronstadt (c. 1880)
- Improvements to harbour at Buenos Aires (c. 1880)
- Deep water docks at Dagenham (off the Thames estuary) (c. 1880)
- Graving dock at Lyttelton Harbour in New Zealand (1882)
- The Albert Exhibition Palace, Battersea in London (1883)
- The Great Western Road Bridge over the River Kelvin (1887)

They also did harbour works in Alexandria, Egypt and on the Baltic coast in Riga.

They engineered water supply schemes for Grangemouth and for Rio Grande and Pelotas in Brazil.
