= James Nicholson (poet) =

Scottish poet (1822–1897)

James Nicholson (1822–1897) was a 19th-century Scottish poet, botanist and spiritualist. He was locally known as The Temperance Poet.

== Life ==
He was born at 7 Leith Street in Edinburgh on 21 October 1822 the son of John Nicholson, a tailor. The family moved to Paisley in 1828 in extreme poverty. He did not receive any strong schooling and began work in a tobacco factory aged seven. The family moved to more rural surroundings in Strathaven around 1834, and he worked on a farm as a herd boy, teaching himself to read in his spare time.

In 1836 he was sent back to Edinburgh to be apprenticed as a tailor under his grandfather John Nicholson at 63 North Bridge.

In 1843 he returned to Strathaven and unsuccessfully began a business with his brother-in-law. He also began to take an interest in botany. In 1853 he abandoned his own business and went to Govan Poorhouse on Eglinton Street as foreman tailor, overseeing the sewing works. He continued in this role, under the auspices of Govan Parochial Board, for 44 years.

He retired in 1895 aged 73, then living at 218 Eglinton Street in Glasgow. He died at his daughter's house 2 Newstead Place in Govan on 24 September 1897. He was buried in Craigton Cemetery in the south-west of Glasgow.

== Family ==
In 1843 he was married to Eliza and they had a daughter Eliza who died young and with whom he tried to communicate at spiritualist meetings (seances).

== Principal works ==
- Weeds and Wildflowers (1850) a botanical appraisal
- Notaichean a Chlair
- Willie Waugh, or The angel O Hame (1861)
- The Phenomena of the Unseen (1866)
- Wee Tibbie's Garland, and Other Poems (1873)
- Rest for the Weary (1875)
- Kilwuddie, and Other Poems (1876)
- Idylls o Hame (1877)
- Poems (1880) with "E C Nicholson" (possibly his wife)
- Nightly Wanderings in the Garden Sky (1880)
